= The Struggle Pakistan =

Trotskyist, left-wing organization in Pakistan

The Struggle طبقاتی جدوجہد
- Founder: Lal Khan
- Founded: November 1980
- Headquarters: Lahore
- Newspaper: Tabqati Jeddojehd
- Ideology: Marxism; Socialism; Trotskyism
- Political position: Left-wing

Website
- https://www.struggle.pk

The Struggle (Urdu: طبقاتی جدوجہد) is a Trotskyist, left-wing organization in Pakistan whose main theoretician was Lal Khan. The paper organ or magazine known as طبقاتی جہدوجہد has been published by the organization for last 42 years.

== Formation ==
The origins of the Struggle Group trace back to November 1980 in the Netherlands, when several Pakistani leftist activists Farooq Tariq, Tanvir Gondal (later known as Lal Khan), Muhammed Amjad, and Ayub Gorya fled Pakistan to escape the repression of General Zia-ul-Haq and found themselves in Amsterdam. While in exile, they discussed strategies to challenge Zia’s military regime and developed the concept for a progressive organization they named the Struggle Group, aimed at sustaining political activism abroad.

That same month, the group launched a monthly Urdu magazine, Jeddojehad ("The Struggle"). The publication soon gained a following among the Pakistani diaspora and featured contributions from poets such as Habib Jalib, Ahmad Faraz, and Faiz Ahmed Faiz, who wrote revolutionary and anti-dictatorship poetry. In December 1984, the magazine published Main Baaghi Hoon by Khalid Javaid Jan, a poem that became well known for its defiant tone and was recited in underground protests against the Zia regime.

While in exile, the Struggle Group organized demonstrations against military rule, including a mass funeral for Zulfikar Ali Bhutto outside the Pakistani embassy in the Netherlands, attended by nearly 500 people. Some participants threw stones at the embassy windows, and Farooq Tariq was briefly arrested by Dutch police. Their activism, along with attempts by Pakistani authorities to have them detained, increased their profile among leftist and progressive movements in Europe. They also campaigned on labor rights, anti-racism, immigrant issues, and anti-nuclear policies in collaboration with European leftist parties. During this period, the group developed links with the Committee for a Workers' International (CWI), a Trotskyist international network.

=== Pakistan work and splits ===
In 1986, the Struggle group started working from Pakistani soil when Farooq Tariq and Lal Khan returned to Pakistan. The Struggle followed a strategy known as Entryism, a theory that small militant groups should join mainstream workers’ parties in order to pull them to the left. The strategy is employed in an attempt to expand influence and was advocated by Trotsky. The Struggle at this stage was the official section of CWI in Pakistan and thus worked within PPP.

=== CWI and 1990s split ===
In the early 1990s, the Committee for a Workers' International (CWI) split over the question of Entryism. Peter Taaffe, a prominent member of its English section, advocated an Open Turn toward building an independent workers’ organization. Ted Grant opposed this, supporting continued work within mainstream workers’ parties. The Struggle also divided along these lines. Farooq Tariq and about a dozen members followed Taaffe’s approach, forming an independent political party for workers in Pakistan. The faction led by Lal Khan remained in the PPP, applying the entryist strategy first advocated by Leon Trotsky.

=== IMT and 2016 split ===
In 2016, The Struggle experienced a significant split over disagreements regarding the party's orientation and approach. A faction led by Adam Pal formed the Lal Salaam organization, arguing that The Struggle had become stagnant and out of touch with evolving political realities. Lal Salaam stated that the leadership had fallen into a routine, repeating ideas and slogans they considered outdated and no longer relevant to the current political landscape. They argued this had hindered the organization's ability to adapt and effectively engage with the working class.

The Struggle attributed the split to what it described as the IMT's "total degeneration and sectarianism" as well as the "bureaucratic behavior" of its leadership. It maintained that these factors, rather than differences in political orientation, were the primary reasons for its departure. The Adam Pal led IMT faction later constituted the ICP in 2024 when the Revolutionary Communist International was established. The ICP played a crucial role in the Azad Jammu Kashmir Protests from 2023 to present.

=== ISL and 2023 split ===
At the end of 2021, a delegation from The Struggle attended the first congress of the International Socialist League (2019) (ISL) and subsequently affiliated with the organization. The ISL describes itself as a revolutionary international bringing together parties and activists from different traditions, committed to "healthy democratic centralism" and united action in class struggles worldwide.

In 2022, debates arose within the ISL over the Russian invasion of Ukraine. The Socialist Laborers Party (SEP) of Turkey left the ISL, arguing that its emphasis on the “defeat of Russia” aligned with NATO’s goals, and stating that socialists should oppose their own imperialist states. The discussions also led to a split in The Struggle. One faction remained affiliated with the ISL, while the other advocated a return to entryist tactics. Members of the latter have accused The Struggle’s leadership of moving away from Ted Grant’s political tradition and toward a “New Left” approach influenced by Morenoism. The ISL and The Struggle leadership reject this characterization, maintaining that their affiliation reflects a commitment to a broad revolutionary project uniting diverse socialist traditions.

== Publications ==
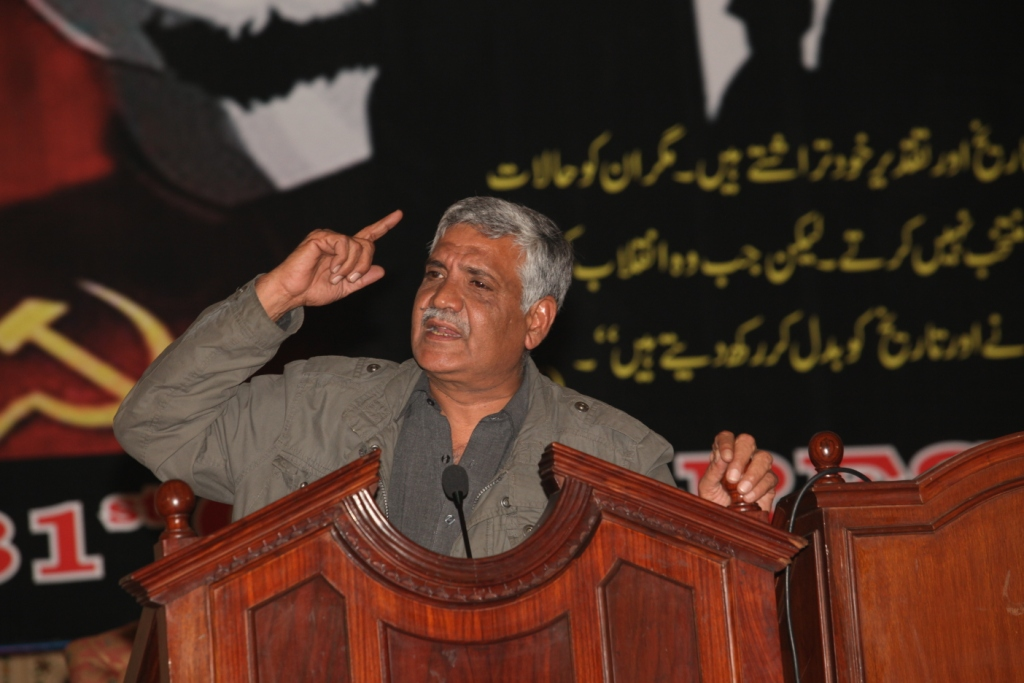
Lal Khan addressing The Struggle congress.

Lal Khan served as editor of the Struggle magazine and as leader of the Struggle group until his death. He wrote regularly for the Daily Times and Dunya. The Struggle group operates its own publishing arm and has issued numerous books and leaflets on Marxist theory, the history of Marxist movements in Pakistan, and the Bolshevik revolution. Notable titles include Partition – Can it be Undone?, Pakistan's Other Story – The Revolution of 1968–69, and Kashmir, A Revolutionary Way Out. The group has published works in Urdu, and it has produced Urdu translations of works originally published in other languages. For the centenary of the Russian Revolution, the group published a 1,200-page Urdu translation of Leon Trotsky’s History of the Russian Revolution. Contemporary reports stated that this was the first translation of the work into a South Asian language.

== Working in masses ==
The organization conducts open work through various fronts that operate collectively under its umbrella. The workers’ front is the Pakistan Trade Union Defence Campaign (PTUDC), while the Revolutionary Students Front (RSF) and the Jammu Kashmir National Students Federation (JKNSF) engage with students and youth. In 2015, the youth and student fronts launched a campaign to unite prominent left-wing student organizations across the country on a single platform. The organization holds regular congresses to review its activities, assess the performance of The Struggle, and formulate new strategies for social change and revolution. In March 2013, Malala Yousafzai sent a message of solidarity to The Struggle's congress. In the Pakistani general election, 2018, its prominent leader Ali Wazir was elected as a member of the National Assembly of Pakistan.
