= Lal Khan =

Pakistani revolutionary

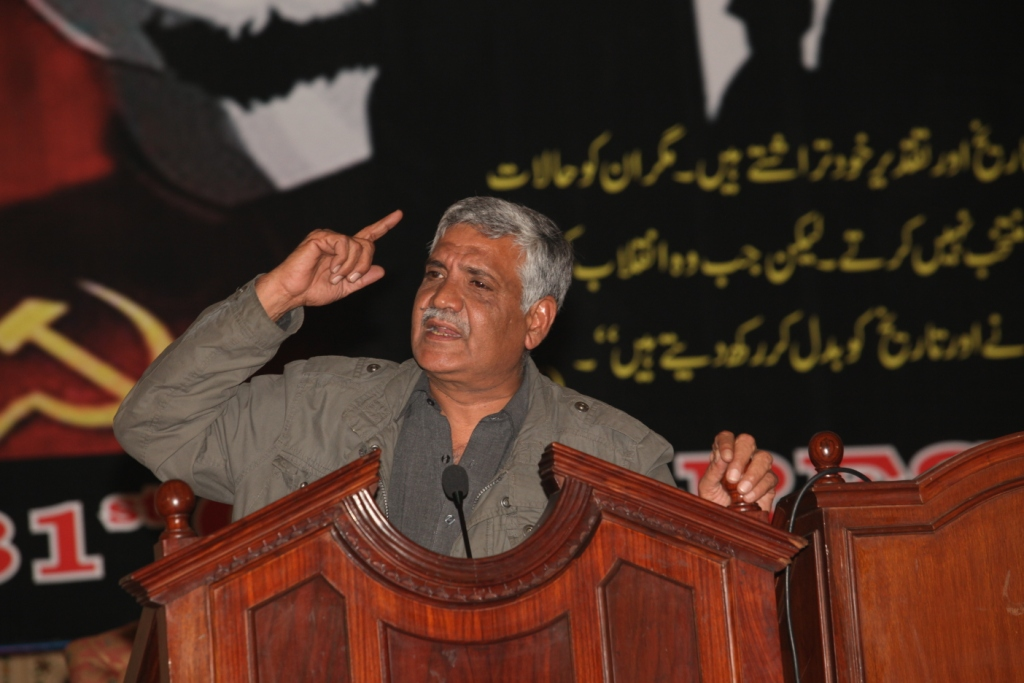
- Lal Khan addressing the Congress of The Struggle in Lahore on 2008.
- Born: Tanveer Gondal; 1956; Bhaun, Punjab, Pakistan
- Died: 21 February 2020 (aged 63)
- Education: Nishtar Medical College; Vrije Universiteit Amsterdam
- Occupations: Political theorist, activist, writer
- Organization: The Struggle Pakistan
- Notable work: Pakistan's Other Story; The 1968-9 Revolution
- Website: www.struggle.pk

Lal Khan (Note: Urdu: لال خان) (born Tanveer Gondal; June 1956 – 21 February 2020) was a Pakistani political activist and Marxist political theorist.

He was a physician by profession but ceased practicing medicine in order to devote his time to political activity. Adopting the name Lal Khan, he was the leader of the Pakistani Marxist organization The Struggle, and editor of its newspaper. He also wrote regular articles for Daily Times and the Dunya. He died on 21 February 2020 after being ill with cancer for more than a year.

== Early life ==
In the 1970s, Khan was a student of medicine in Nishtar Medical College Multan and a political activist in Pakistan when the military coup of General Zia ul Haq toppled the Pakistan Peoples Party government, and subsequently hanged the country's first democratically elected prime minister Zulfiqar Ali Bhutto. He went to university in the capital of Pakistan, Islamabad. He moved to The Netherlands in 1980 to escape by fearing the death in Pakistan. During his time in exile, he graduated from the Vrije Universiteit in Amsterdam, and continued to reside in the Netherlands for eight more years. In 1988, he returned to his country and quit his profession as a doctor, in order to work full-time in revolutionary politics.

== Career ==
He was the leading member of The Struggle which is based on the ideas of Marx, Engels, Lenin and Trotsky and advocates a socialist transformation of Pakistan. It demands the nationalization of the commanding heights of the economy under workers control, an end to religious extremism and radicalism, the eradication of unemployment and free accessible education for all Pakistani citizens. He was the editor of Asian Marxist Review and International Secretary of Pakistan Trade Union Defence Campaign.

Lal Khan criticized the partition of India and advocated for Indian reunification, which he stated would heal continuing wounds and solve the Kashmir conflict. Advocating for a common revolution, Khan declared that "Five thousand years of common history, culture and society is too strong to be cleavaged by this partition." His views are described his book "Crisis in the Indian Subcontinent, Partition: Can it be Undone?" in which Khan states that "revolutionary transformation of the economies and societies is an essential prerequisite for the reunification of the subcontinent."

Reunification cannot be imposed on any nationality, community, religion or ethnic group. It must be a voluntary socialist federation. The main dynamic will be the programme and perspective of the revolutionary party, leading the insurrection. The programme must be based on the principles of scientific socialism. The eradication of misery, poverty, disease, ignorance, exploitation, national oppression and the subjugation of women and minorities in society is only possible through the overthrow of capitalism. The annihilation of the existing decaying and repressive states will be linked to the creation of a greater proletarian state based on a workers’ democracy. —Lal Khan

On 12–13 March 2011 the largest congress of The Struggle was held in Lahore. These annual congresses are held to analyse the performance of The Struggle and to formulate new strategies for social change and revolution.

In October 2013, Khan accused Malala Yousafzai's supporters in the West of appropriating her and concealing her socialist background.

In a joint statement in August 2016, Khan and CPI(M) Jammu and Kashmir general secretary Mohammed Yousuf Tarigami called for revolutionary unity between the working classes of India and Pakistan to resolve the Kashmir conflict and overthrow capitalism in the subcontinent.

== Publications ==
- Partition – Can it be undone? This book examines the historical background of partition of the Indian subcontinent, and the formation of Pakistan and India.
- Lebanon-Israel War. Written in 2009, this book discusses not only the current conflict between Lebanon and Israel in detail, but also looks at the history of wars and revolutions in the whole region. The changing role of Iran in the region and the possibility of an invasion of Iran are also discussed in detail.
- Pakistan's Other Story – The Revolution of 1968–69. This book examines the student and political activism of the late 1960s which gave birth to a revolution. Khan argues that due to lack of leadership courage, the opportunity to establish a worker's state was lost.
- Kashmir, A revolutionary way out. This book examines the possibility of the liberation of Kashmir under a united South Asian socialist federation.

== Death ==
On 21 February 2020, he died after suffering from cancer for more than a year at a local hospital in Lahore.

== See also ==
- Trotskyism
- Revolutionary Communist International
- Ted Grant
- Alan Woods
