= Revolutionary Left (Spain) =

Revolutionary left Izquierda Revolucionaria
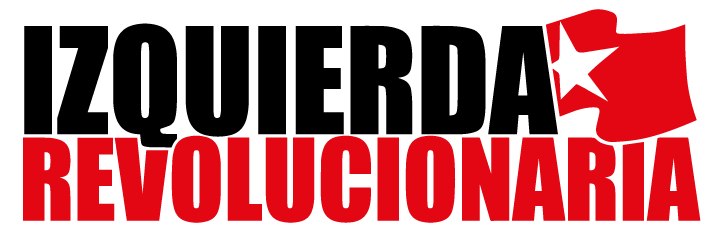
- Leader: Collective leadership
- Chairman: Juan Ignacio Ramos
- Headquarters: Calle Hermanos del Moral, 33, bajo A, 28019, Madrid
- Newspaper: El Militante (Spanish), Militant (Catalan), Euskal Herria Sozialista (Basque)
- Ideology: Marxism; Socialism; Trotskyism
- Political position: Far-left
- International affiliation: International Revolutionary Left
- Colours: Red

Website
- http://www.izquierdarevolucionaria.net/

Revolutionary Left (Spanish: Izquierda Revolucionaria; Catalan: Esquerra Revolucionària; Basque: Ezker Iraultzailea; Galician: Esquerda Revolucionaria) is a Trotskyist political party in Spain formerly affiliated with the Committee for a Workers' International (CWI). Revolutionary left publishes El Militante in Spanish, Militant in Catalan and Euskal Herria Sozialista. They contain a socialist perspective on news and current issues. It campaigns for a party of the working class to express the political needs of those not benefiting from the capitalist system. They believe a strong and organized movement of workers and young people can overthrow capitalism and establish a new society. This can be achieved by taking banks and big businesses into public ownership and administering them through democratic control and management.

== History ==
=== Origins ===
The group originated around a newspaper called Nuevo Claridad (New Clarity) which was the paper of the youth section of the Spanish Socialist Workers' Party (PSOE) in Alava in June 1976. By 1979 the leadership of PSOE had decided to move the party away from its Marxist roots and expel the Marxists around Nuevo Claridad. There were further expulsions from PSOE in 1980. In 1989 the name of the newspaper was changed to El Militante.

=== Split from CWI ===
The CWI split in early 1992 over many issues, primarily whether to continue working within social democratic parties. The majority in the UK, rejecting entryism, formed Militant Labour, which subsequently became the Socialist Party of England and Wales. Grant together with Alan Woods formed Socialist Appeal in Britain. The faction fight within Militant played itself out within the CWI with supporters of the Grant faction leaving to form the International Marxist Tendency (IMT) in several countries, particularly Spain.

=== Split from IMT ===
In late 2009, a dispute developed between the IMT leadership and the leadership of its sections in Spain (El Militante), Venezuela (Corriente Marxista Revolucionaria) and Mexico. In January 2010, these organisations, together with the group in Colombia and part of the section in Mexico, the broke with the IMT and established a new international body, the Revolucionaria Internacional (International Revolutionary Left).

=== Reunification with the CWI ===
After a series of discussions and exchanges of documents, a merger was agreed upon by the Revolutionary left along with their co thinkers in Venezuela and Mexico with the Committee for a Workers' International.

=== Second split from CWI ===
In early April 2019, IR split from CWI after differences emerged relating to the analysis of the CWI regarding the lowering of socialist consciousness following the collapse of the Stalinist regimes and the consequences this had for the international workers' movement at the time along with the extent to which these effects are still present today. Revolutionary Left in Spain together with other groups that left the CWI: Revolutionary Socialism in Portugal, and Revolutionary Left groups in Mexico and Venezuela and Offensiv in Germany, formed Izquierda Revolucionaria Internacional (International Revolutionary Left) as a Trotskyist international.

== School student union ==
In 1986, the group were the main impulse behind the creation of the Spanish school students' union. The current general secretary of the Spanish School students union is Ana Garcia, who is also a member of Revolutionary Left. The two organisations have been linked and criticised by the People's Party (Spain).

== Political views ==
=== Catalan independence ===
They are in favour of the right to self-determination including independence but fight for a socialist Catalan state as part of voluntary Iberian federation. They are against alliances with pro-capitalist parties for independence, as it would suppress the voice of the working class who hold the real power for change through mass movements.
