= Alan Woods (political theorist) =

Welsh political theorist and author (born 1944)

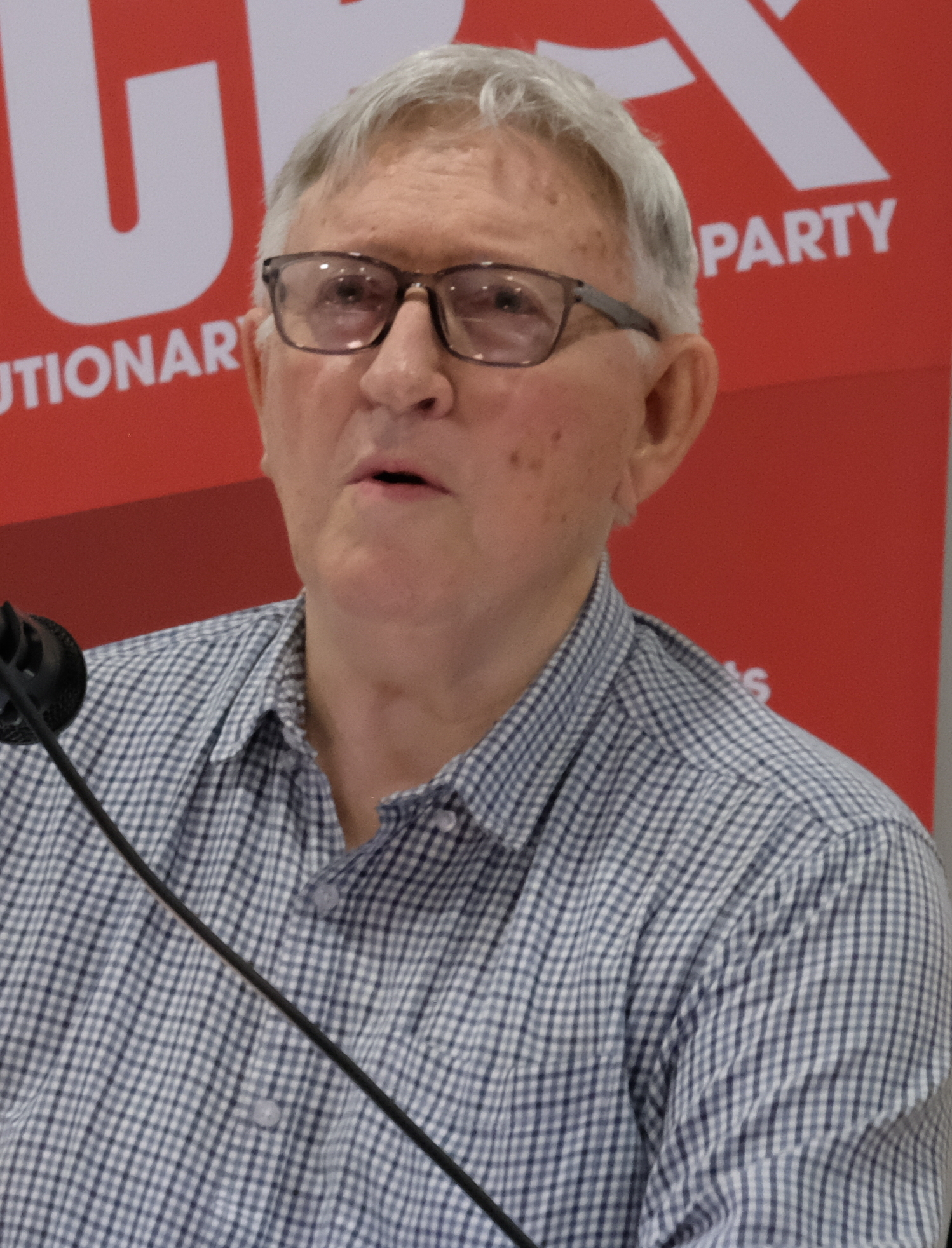
- Woods in 2025
- Born: 23 October 1944 (age 82); Swansea, Wales
- Education: University of Sussex; Sofia University; Moscow State University
- Occupations: Political theorist, activist, writer
- Movement: Revolutionary Communist International
- Relatives: Rob Sewell (brother)
- Website: marxist.com

Alan Woods (born 23 October 1944) is a Welsh Trotskyist political theorist and author. He is one of the leading members of the Revolutionary Communist International (RCI) and was a founder of Socialist Appeal (now the Revolutionary Communist Party). He is political editor of the RCI's In Defence of Marxism website. Woods was a leading supporter within the Militant tendency within the Labour Party and its parent group the Committee for a Workers' International until the early 1990s. A series of disagreements on tactics and theory led to Woods and Ted Grant leaving the CWI, to found the Committee for a Marxist International (soon renamed International Marxist Tendency) in 1992. They continued with the policy of entryism into the Labour Party. Woods has expressed particularly vocal support for the Bolivarian Revolution in Venezuela, and repeatedly met with the Venezuelan President Hugo Chávez, leading to speculation that he was a close political adviser to the president.

== Early life ==
Woods was born into a working-class family in Swansea, South Wales and grew up in the Townhill and Penlan areas of the city, with his younger brother Rob Sewell. His mother and his grandfather, a tin plate worker and trade unionist, were both members of the Communist Party of Great Britain. He was introduced to Marxism by his grandfather. In 1960, at the age of 16, he joined the Young Socialists in Swansea. As a result of discussions in the branch, he soon became a supporter of Trotskyism.

Woods studied Russian and Slavic studies at the then-experimental University of Sussex from 1963. His work in Brighton for the Militant tendency within the Labour Party (founded in 1964) established an important base of support at the university (including within the LP's Socialist Society and in fellow student Thabo Mbeki's anti-apartheid group) and in the town. Woods then studied in Sofia (Bulgaria) and at the Moscow State University.

In 1969, he became a regional organiser for Militant in South Wales, alongside his brother Rob Sewell. Elected to Militant's national leadership, Woods participated in the founding of the Committee for a Workers' International in 1974 and was entrusted with building its international structures in Spain during the Transition. He moved to Spain with his first wife and children in January 1976 and carried out organising work there until returning to Britain in 1983. He was then involved in establishing the CWI in Argentina, Chile, Mexico and Pakistan, edited the Militant International Review (the tendency's theoretical journal), and suffered expulsion from the Labour Party during the purge of Militant activists from 1983 onwards. Following the 1985 Liverpool School Strike, the group organised by Woods in Spain launched the Spanish School Students' Union (Sindicato de Estudiantes) in 1986.

== Split in Militant ==
In the early 1990s, Woods and his mentor, Ted Grant, left the Militant tendency and its parent organization, the Committee for a Workers' International, over what they considered to be the ultraleft turn of this organisation when it decided to split from the Labour Party. In early 1991, Grant and Woods confronted Peter Taaffe over what they saw as the development of a bureaucratic clique around him. The minority group, led by Ted Grant, also argued that a decline in emphasis on political education was damaging Militant. According to Peter Taaffe, they also differed from the majority in taking a position of critical support towards the 1991 Soviet coup attempt by Gennady Yanayev. In early 1992, the split (described as expulsion by the minority) occurred, with Grant and Woods and their supporters internationally forming the Committee for a Marxist International, which was later to be known as the International Marxist Tendency (IMT) and remained active in the Labour Party. The British section of the IMT was known as Socialist Appeal, which in 2024 became the Revolutionary Communist Party. The IMT became the Revolutionary Communist International in 2024.

== Political views ==
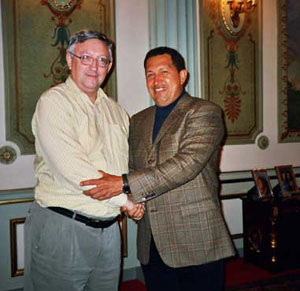
Woods and Hugo Chávez in a meeting

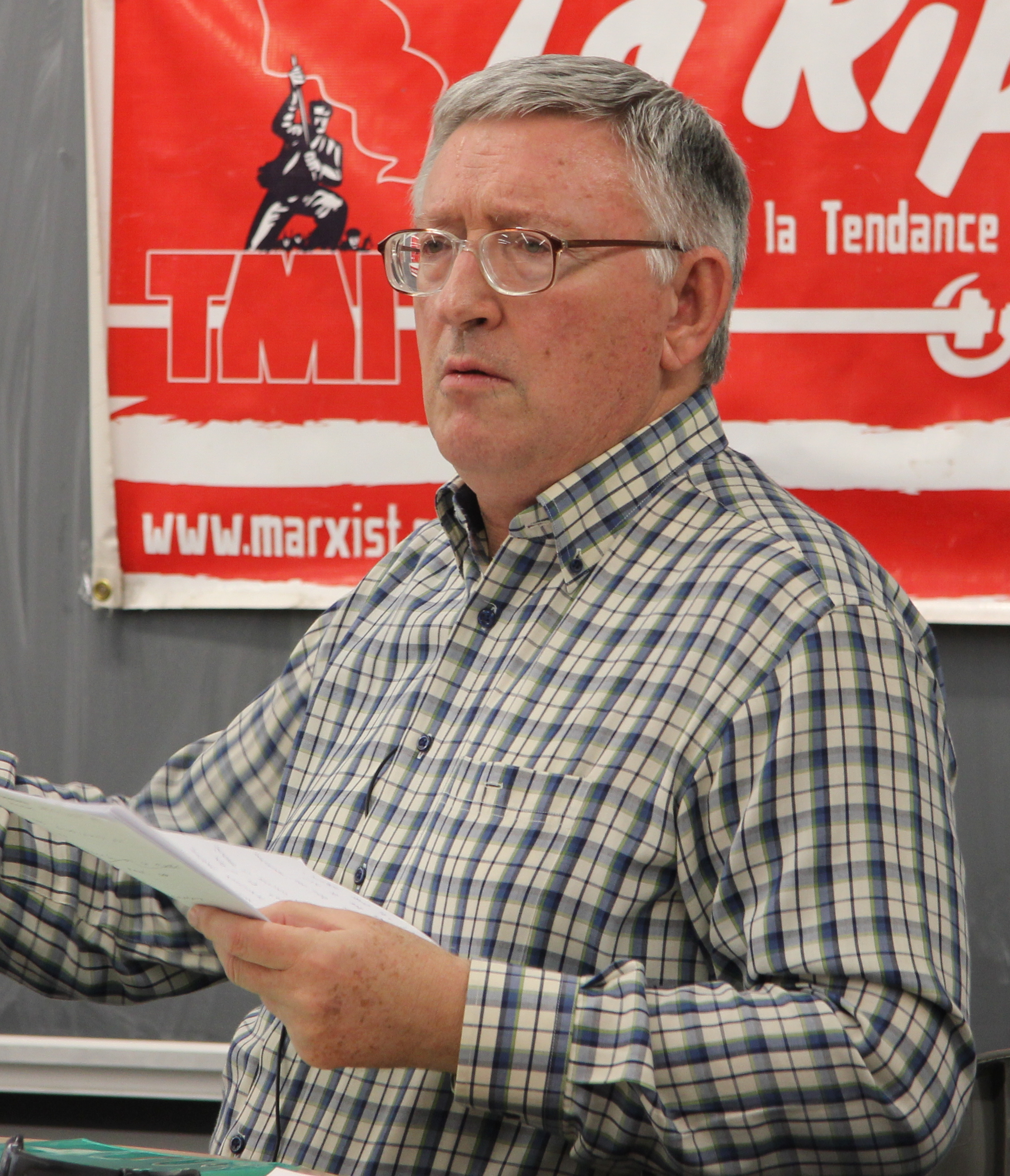
Woods in Montreal, 2012

Woods was the editor for some years of the Marxist journal Socialist Appeal, published in London. He launched a book series associated with the magazine jointly with Ted Grant in 1995.

Woods was a friend of Leon Trotsky's grandson Esteban Volkov, who endorsed Woods's political line as closest to Trotsky's own ideas. His economic views have been influenced by Michael Roberts (pen name Bob McKee), a Marxist economist who worked in the City of London.

Woods had meetings with Venezuelan President Hugo Chávez and was described as a "frequent visitor to the presidential palace in Caracas". He helped organise Chávez's private visit to London in 2006, which included a meeting with Mayor of London Ken Livingstone. He gained prominence as a fierce critic of Heinz Dieterich, who was Chávez's adviser until joining General Raúl Baduel's opposition to the constitutional referendum of 2007. President Chávez publicly stated in a TV broadcast that he was reading Woods' 2008 book Reformism or Revolution (subtitled A Reply to Heinz Dieterich) "in great detail", which encouraged speculation that Woods was his new adviser.

In 2010, Woods was subject to severe criticism, firstly by some Venezuelan newspapers then by international media outlets, for an article (Where is the Venezuelan revolution going?) he wrote on the IMT website.

In November 2012, Woods went on a speaking tour in both the United States and Canada.

He regularly travelled to Pakistan, Bolivia and Cuba to support the revolutionary processes in these countries.

== Publications ==
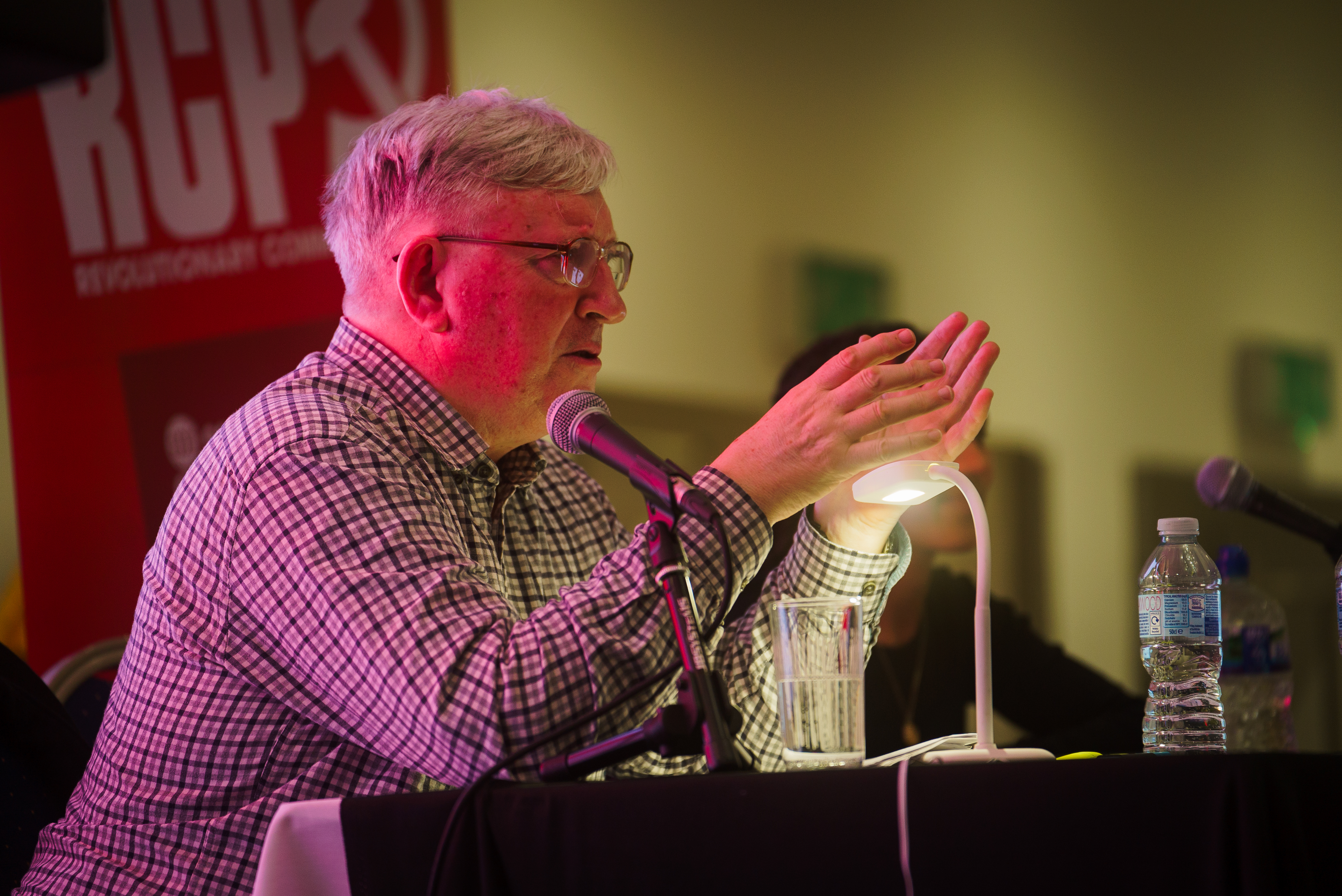
Woods at the founding congress of the Revolutionary Communist Party (UK), 2024

- Marxism in Our Time (1992)
- China in Crisis (1994)
- A Socialist Alternative to the European Union (1997)
- Revolution in Albania (1997)
- A New Stage in the Capitalist Crisis (1998)
- Indonesia: the Asian Revolution has Begun (1998)
- The Kosovo pogrom and the Balkan Powder-keg (1998)
- Crisis in Russia, the free market failure,
- History of Philosophy,
- Two books co-authored with Ted Grant
  - Lenin and Trotsky: what they really stood for (1969)
  - Reason in Revolt: Marxist philosophy and modern science (1995)
- Bolshevism: the Road to Revolution (1999).
- Marxism and the National Question (2000)
- British Poets and the French Revolution (2003)
- The revolutionary dialectic of Republicanism – An Open Letter to Irish Republicans (2003).
- In Defence of Marxism – Reply to Israel Shamir (2004)
- The Celia Hart Controversy – Stalinism or Leninism? (2004)
- Ireland: Republicanism and Revolution (2005)
- The Venezuelan Revolution – a Marxist perspective (2005)
- Marxism and the U.S.A. – article (Wellred USA, 2005).
- The Reawakening of the World Working Class and the Tasks Faced by Marxists (2006)
- Reformism or Revolution – Marxism and Socialism of the 21st Century (reply to Heinz Dieterich) (2008)
- XXI Century Socialism, or There is Nothing New Under the Sun November 2010
- Marxism and Anarchism – A collection of writings (2012)
- The First World War: A Marxist Analysis of the Great Slaughter (2019)
- The History of Philosophy: A Marxist Perspective (2021)
- In Defence Of Lenin (2024) (co-authored with Rob Sewell)

== Private life ==
Woods is married and has two children. He lived in Spain as of 2013.
