= New Socialist Alternative (India) =

- Headquarters: Bangalore, India
- Newspaper: Dudiyora Horaata (Workers' Struggle)
- Ideology: Marxism; Socialism; Trotskyism
- Political position: Far-left
- International affiliation: Committee for a Workers' International (Refounded)
- Colours: Red

Website
- www.socialism.in

New Socialist Alternative is a Trotskyist political party in India affiliated with the Committee for a Workers' International. It publishes the campaigning newspaper Dudiyora Horaata.

The CWI gained its first Indian supporters after their discussions with the group's executive committee member Peter Taaffe in 1977.

New Socialist Alternative actively supports Tamil Solidarity, an international campaign working for the rights of the people of Sri Lanka, and has sought the closure of a camp for the detention of Tamil refugees in the Indian state of Tamil Nadu.

The party has criticised the FIFA World Cup being used to channel large amounts of public money into private hands.
