= Hannah Sell =

British Marxist political activist

General Secretary of the Socialist Party
- Incumbent
- Assumed office 2020
- Preceded by: Peter Taaffe

National secretary of Youth against Racism in Europe (YRE)
- In office 1992–1996

Youth representative on the National Executive Committee of the Labour Party
- In office 1988–1990
- Preceded by: Linda Douglas
- Succeeded by: Alun Parry

Personal details
- Born: 1971 (age 54–55)
- Party: Socialist Party

Hannah Sell (born 1971) is a British Marxist political activist. She is general secretary of the Socialist Party having been a member of the party and its predecessor, Militant, since the 1980s. Sell succeeded Peter Taaffe as general secretary in 2020. She was a member of the National Executive Committee of the Labour Party in 1988 and 1989, representing the Labour Party Young Socialists. She was national secretary of Youth against Racism in Europe (YRE) between 1992 and 1996.

She is the author of the book Socialism in the 21st Century and numerous articles in The Socialist and Socialism Today. She has also been supportive of the Youth Fight for Jobs campaign which aims to raise awareness of youth unemployment and provide a voice for young unemployed and low paid workers.
