= Ron Heisler =

British book collector, trade unionist, socialist, and historian

Ronald B. Heisler (born 1941) is a British book collector, trade unionist, socialist, and self-described "delinquent historian" who has given his name to the Ron Heisler Collection at Senate House Library, University of London.

== Early life ==
Heisler was born in Downham Market, Norfolk, England in 1941, the son of Austrian migrants to the United Kingdom from Vienna in 1938. His father he described as a "politico" who was involved in the Social Democrats in the 1920s and was the manager of a clothes shop. His mother was raised as a Catholic in the Sudetenland, the daughter of the manager of a graphite mine who had been the first socialist in his village around 1890 or 1900. He describes himself as having the classic background of a book collector, having suffered a serious illness at the age of 3 or 4 when he was in a coma and "given up for dead". He recovered but was left very weak and subsequently absorbed himself in reading. The family moved to London from Norfolk on the back of a potato truck arriving at 337 Victoria Park Road, Hackney, at 8.00 pm on Christmas Eve, 1947.

== Collecting ==
Heisler describes himself as "becoming politicised" during the Suez Crisis of 1956 and became involved in the Young Socialists in Hackney Central in London where he was influenced by Robin Jamieson. He began to seriously collect political literature when he was 18 and says that he became obsessive about it, visiting all the left wing political bookshops of London. His collection relates to all forms of radical politics but is mainly related to left wing thought. It also is devoted at least 20% to socialism and the arts which Heisler says is poorly represented in other political collections, for instance he collected over 2,000 works of fiction related to politics and has also tried to collect works of working class poetry. He accumulated over 2,000 items about anarchism. His collecting expanded rapidly after he dropped out of active politics in the 1980s after he became disillusioned with the Labour Party politics of the time.

In 2004, Heisler began to donate his collection to Senate House library. It consists of around 5,000 books, 3,000 journals and newspapers, and 20,000 pamphlets relating to radical and left-wing politics.
