= Revolutionary Left =

Revolutionary Left may refer to:

- Revolutionary Left (Spain)
- Revolutionary Left Movement (Peru)
- Revolutionary Left Movement (Chile)
- Revolutionary Left Movement (Bolivia)
- Revolutionary Left Movement (Venezuela)
- Revolutionary Left Union, an electoral front in Peru
- Revolutionary People's Liberation Party/Front, Turkey, founded as Revolutionary Left (Devrimci Sol or Dev Sol)

== See also ==
- Far-left politics
