= Hands Off Venezuela =

Political lobby group in the United Kingdom

- Hands Off Venezuela logo
- Formation: 2002
- Type: Political pressure group
- Purpose: To build support for Hugo Chavez's Bolivarian revolution
- Headquarters: London, England
- National Secretary: Jorge Martin
- Website: http://www.handsoffvenezuela.org

Hands Off Venezuela is a political lobby group based in the United Kingdom with branches in other countries. The campaign was established in December 2002, following the Venezuelan coup attempt of 2002, with the aim of increasing public and political awareness in the UK and elsewhere of the Hugo Chávez government's social and political reforms and to counter what Hands Off Venezuela sees as a "US-funded propaganda campaign" in the west to paint Chávez as a dictator and a threat to democracy.

== History ==
The organisation was founded by Alan Woods (member of the Revolutionary Communist International), a Welsh Trotskyist and political writer, who wrote an appeal, calling for "defense of the revolutionary process in Venezuela" and to defend the Bolivarian Revolution, to oppose US intervention in Venezuela, and to ensure that information about what was happening in Venezuela would reach the international labour movement.

== Activity ==
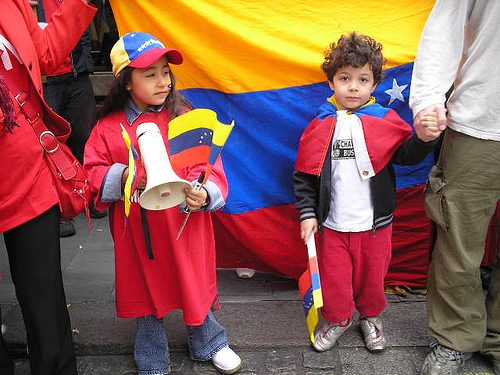
Some Venezuelan HOV supporters welcome Chávez to London, May 2006

The organisation issues press releases to counter unfavourable western media reports on the Chávez government, organises protests and participates in national anti-war demonstrations, and works in the British Trade Union Movement. It also has a presence on UK university campuses, where they hold regular lecture sessions on developments in Venezuela, organise visits by Venezuelan Trade Unionists, and screen documentaries.

The organization participated in the visit by Hugo Chávez to London as a guest of Mayor Ken Livingstone. During this trip Chávez refused to meet UK Prime Minister Tony Blair, who he described as a "pawn of [US] imperialism". HOV participated in the resolutions of official support passed by the British Trades Union Congress in 2005 (Motion 79) and 2007 (Motion 76), the Scottish Trades Union Congress (Resolution 108) and an Early Day Motion (EDM 487) raised in the House of Commons by supporter John McDonnell, MP.

Other supporters include Jeremy Dear, former general secretary of the British National Union of Journalists, George Galloway and the RESPECT party. President Chávez officially thanked the organisation for their work.

=== 2019 ===
During the Venezuelan presidential crisis, disputed president Nicolás Maduro launched a "Hands Off Venezuela" petition and protested in Washington, D.C.

Two weeks after thirty members of New Haven, Connecticut's Venezuelan community twice demonstrated in favor of Juan Guaidó, twenty HOV demonstrators protested to "declare him a puppet of U.S. imperialism". The HOV message "contrasted with the message of the previous rally, held by Venezuelan immigrants, calling on the U.S. to support regime change."

== Publications ==
In 2006, HOV launched a 24-page glossy promotional magazine, also called "Hands Off Venezuela", and put together an international delegation with members from around the world to observe the December 2006 Presidential Elections first hand.

Year 2007 saw the campaign launch H.O.V FM, a monthly podcast available from its official website. The show features news, interviews, solidarity work, revolutionary music and features and is aimed at both activists and curious minds.

== See also ==
- Government-organized demonstration
- International Marxist Tendency
- Venezuela Solidarity Campaign
