= Peter Taaffe =

British Marxist activist and journalist (1942–2025)

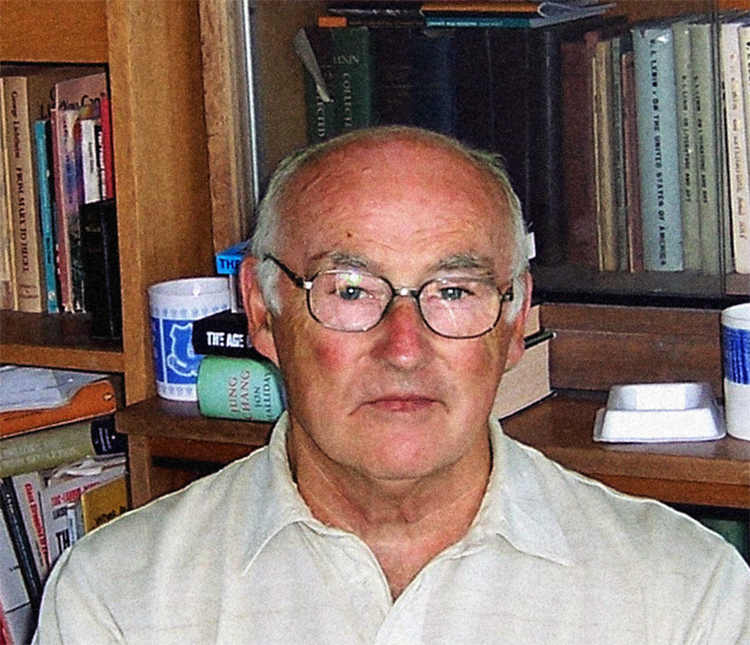
- Taaffe in 2006

General Secretary of the Socialist Party
- In office 1997–2020
- Deputy: Hannah Sell
- Succeeded by: Hannah Sell

General Secretary of Militant Labour
- In office 1992–1997

General Secretary of Militant
- In office 1964–1992
- Preceded by: Position established
- Succeeded by: Position dissolved

Personal details
- Born: 7 April 1942 Birkenhead, Cheshire, England
- Died: 23 April 2025 (aged 83)
- Party: Socialist Party
- Other political affiliations: Labour (until 1983); Revolutionary Socialist League (1960–1964); Committee for a Workers' International

Peter Taaffe (7 April 1942 – 23 April 2025) was a British Marxist Trotskyist political activist and a longtime leader of the Socialist Party and its predecessor, the Militant tendency.

Taaffe was the founding editor of the Trotskyist Militant newspaper in 1964, and became known as a leading member of the entryist Militant group. Taaffe was expelled from the Labour Party in 1983, along with four other members of Militant's editorial board.

Taaffe was influential in the policy decisions of Liverpool City Council of 1983–1987, according to the council's deputy leader Derek Hatton, and in the formation of the Militant tendency's policy regarding the Poll Tax in 1988–1991.

== Early life ==
Taaffe was born in Birkenhead, Cheshire on 7 April 1942. His father, a sheet metal worker, died when he was young. Taaffe and his five siblings grew up in poverty. As a child, the ceiling of Taaffe's house collapsed on him whilst he was asleep, leaving him with a permanent scar on his nose.

One of his early jobs after leaving school was in the Liverpool City Council treasury department.

He was recruited to what would become the Militant tendency in 1960 by Ted Grant.

== General Secretary of Militant ==
Between 1979 and 1982, the group's membership had doubled in size. In 1982, Militant gained control of Liverpool City Council. Derek Hatton, the deputy leader of the council, described Taaffe as a "legendary" figure and a major influence on the council's policy decisions.

Under pressure from centrists within the party, the left-wing Labour leader Michael Foot conducted an internal inquiry into Militant's activities. The Hayward-Hughes inquiry of 1982 found Militant guilty of breaking the Labour Party constitution. Within a year, Taaffe and the rest of Militant's editorial board were expelled from the Labour Party. Following Foot's landslide defeat to Margaret Thatcher in the 1983 election, he was succeeded as Labour leader by Neil Kinnock, who initiated a purge of Taaffe's followers from the Labour Party in an attempt to bring the party closer to the political centre. Throughout the 1980s, scores of Militant activists, including Hatton, were expelled from Labour constituencies across the country.

== General Secretary of Socialist Party (England and Wales) ==
In 1991, there was a debate within Militant as to whether to continue working within the Labour Party, centred around whether they could still effectively operate in the party following the expulsions. The group became Militant Labour in 1991, after leaving the Labour Party. In 1997, Militant Labour changed its name to the Socialist Party.

In 2015, Jeremy Corbyn was elected Leader of the Labour Party. While Taaffe was supportive of Corbyn himself, he was critical of Momentum, a pro-Corbyn grassroots organisation, for refusing to endorse the demand for compulsory reselection of Labour MPs as a means of shifting the party to the left. Taaffe asked, "What is the point of Jeremy Corbyn without the right to remove the Blairites, who are an enormous drag on the progress of the Labour Party?"

In 2016, Taaffe and several other members of the Socialist Party attempted to re-join the Labour Party.

At the Socialist Party National Congress in 2020, Taaffe stood down as General Secretary.

== Personal life and death ==
In 1966, Taaffe married Linda Driscoll. She worked as a primary school teacher, and was heavily involved in a Trotskyist faction of the National Union of Teachers. They had two daughters; Nancy Taaffe stood as a TUSC candidate in local elections. In his youth, Taaffe was a keen footballer, and he was a life-long supporter of Everton Football Club.

Taaffe died on 23 April 2025, at the age of 83.

Media offices
Preceded by New position	Editor of Militant; 1964–1994	Succeeded by Nick Wrack
