= Socialist Appeal (UK, 1992) =

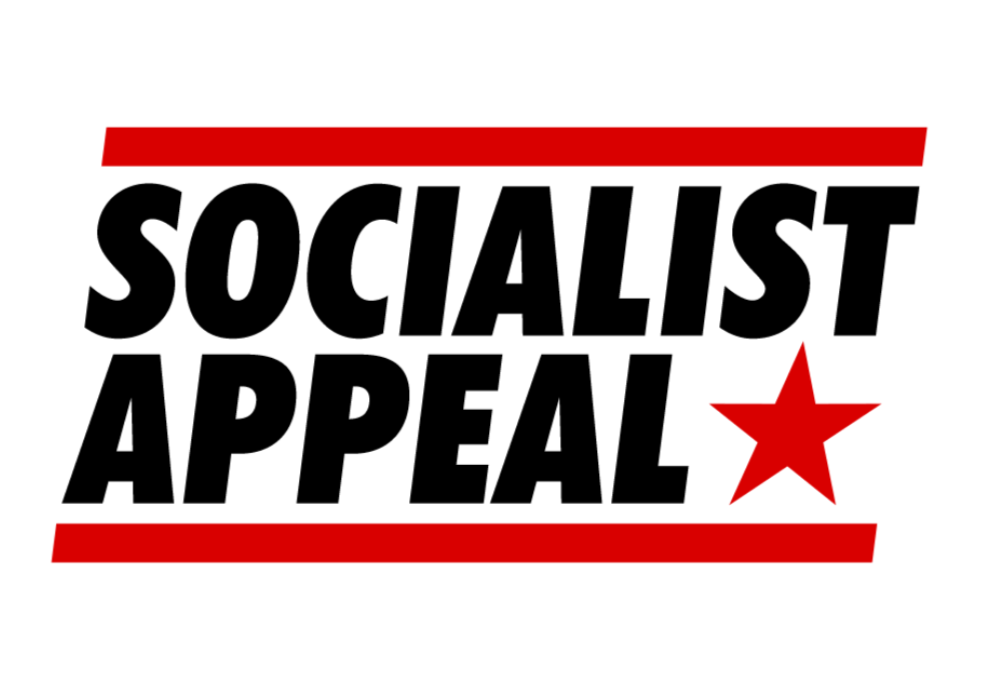
- Founded: April 1992
- Dissolved: May 2024
- Split from: Militant tendency
- Succeeded by: Revolutionary Communist Party
- Newspaper: Socialist Appeal
- Student wing: Marxist Student Federation
- Membership (2016): 300
- Ideology: Marxism; Leninism; Trotskyism
- International affiliation: International Marxist Tendency

Website
- communist.red

Socialist Appeal was the British section of the International Marxist Tendency (IMT), founded in 1992 alongside the IMT by supporters of Ted Grant and Alan Woods after they were expelled from the Militant tendency of the Labour Party. In 2024 the Great Britain-based elements of the IMT were relaunched as the Revolutionary Communist Party.

The organisation described itself as a "Marxist organisation which stands for the socialist transformation of society." Its stated aim was to build a revolutionary leadership capable of leading the working class in a struggle against capitalism. It described its politics as descending from Karl Marx, Friedrich Engels, Vladimir Lenin and Leon Trotsky.

Socialist Appeal published a fortnightly newspaper under the same name until January 2024, and operated the Wellred Books publisher and bookstore.

== History ==
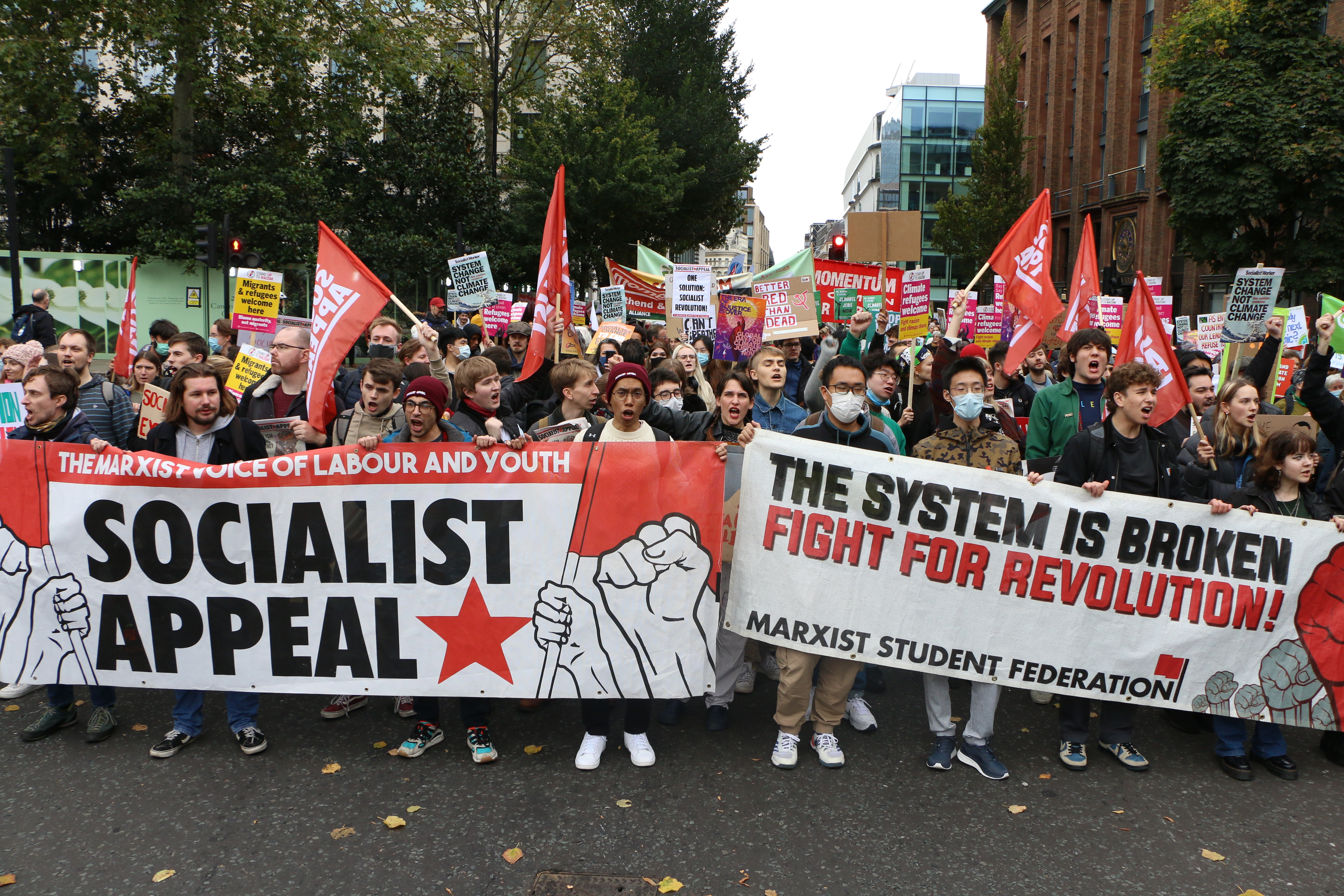
Socialist Appeal and Marxist Student Federation activists at a climate change march in 2021.

In the 1970s and 1980s, Socialist Appeal's predecessor, the Militant tendency, had been a significant force within the British Labour Party. At the height of its influence in the mid-to-late 1980s, Militant had three Labour MPs, control of Liverpool City Council and later initiated the campaign that they claim forced the abandonment of the poll tax. Grant had been one of the founders and the theoretical leader of the Militant group, but he was expelled with other supporters following the 1991 debate on the Open Turn.

The split was caused by what Grant and Woods claimed was the bureaucratic centralist degeneration of Militant's internal regime, as well as Grant's continued support for the tactic of entryism within the Labour Party. In 1991, Militant decided by a large majority to abandon entryism in the Labour Party. Ted Grant, once the group's most important member, was expelled and his breakaway minority, which adopted the name Socialist Appeal, continued with the entryist strategy. The majority changed its name to Militant Labour and then in 1997 to the Socialist Party.

Socialist Appeal began publishing their own journal in 1992. In 2000, the group was estimated to have around 250 supporters.

In 2013, Socialist Appeal launched a student wing, the Marxist Student Federation (MSF), to provide a "national platform for Marxist ideas in the student movement," focused on political discussions at university Marxist societies, as well as campaigning within the labour movement.

Following the Scottish independence referendum in which Scots voted to retain the union with the rest of the United Kingdom, the International Marxist Tendency launched a separate Scottish periodical called Revolution, which analysed events in Scotland, and put forward a Marxist position in relation to the Scottish independence movement. Revolution's masthead carries the slogan "For a Scottish workers' republic and world socialist revolution!".

In July 2021, the Labour Party's National Executive Committee banned Socialist Appeal and ruled that its members could be automatically expelled from the Labour Party.

On 14 November 2023, Socialist Appeal announced that the IMT within Great Britain would be refounded as the Revolutionary Communist Party. The founding congress of the party took place in May 2024.

== Publications ==
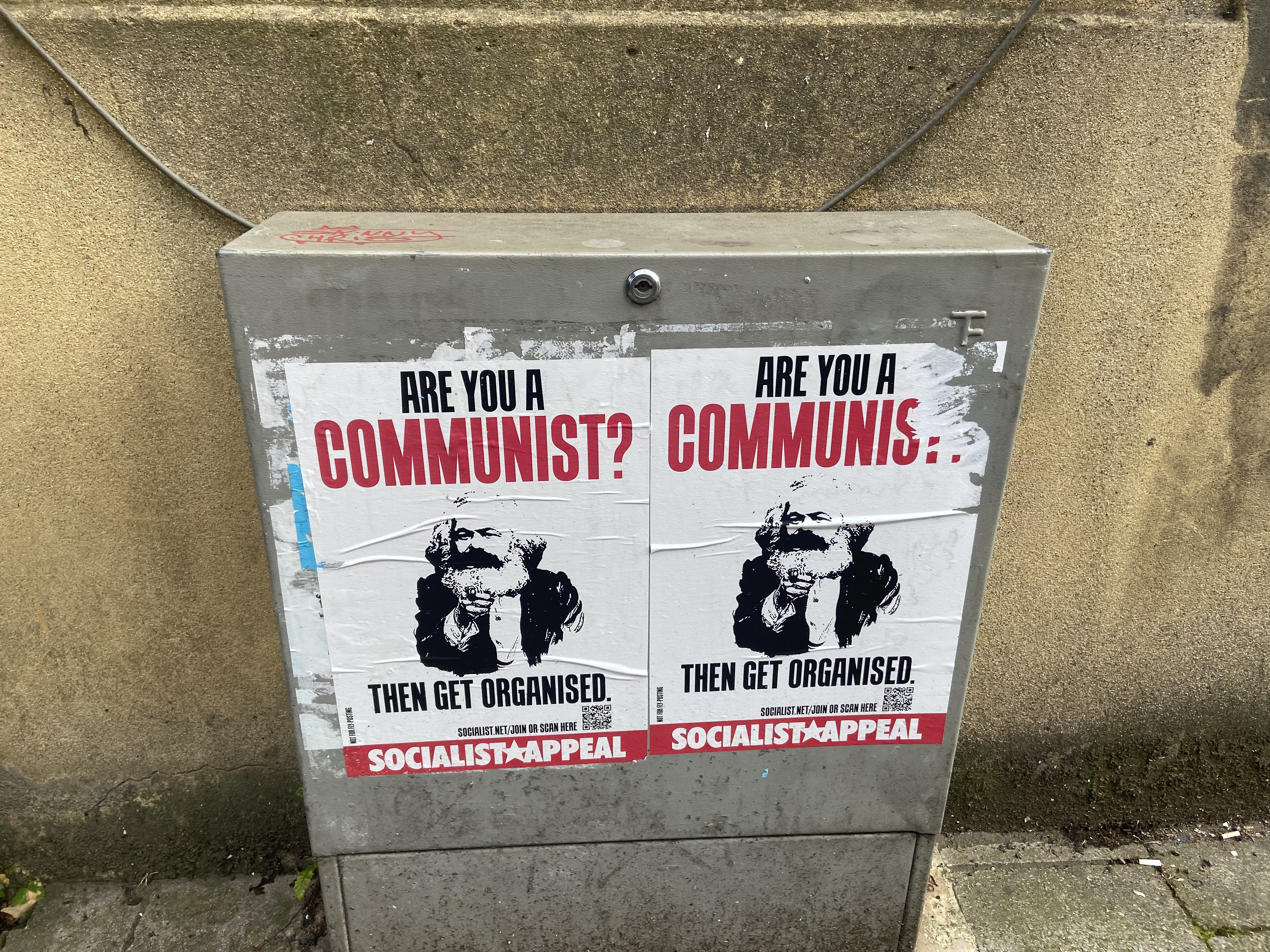
"Are You A Communist?" campaign posters in 2023

Socialist Appeal refers to the fortnightly newspaper of the same name. In September 2009, the publication Socialist Appeal changed from a magazine journal format to a full colour tabloid. As part of the establishment of the Revolutionary Communist Party, the paper was merged with the Scottish IMT newspaper, Revolution, to form The Communist in January 2024.

The group also produced and/or published books, pamphlets, magazines and other Marxist educational material through the Wellred Books site operated by themselves.

Socialist Appeal was also the name of two British Trotskyist newspapers associated with Ted Grant in the 1940s: one was the newspaper of the Workers International League and immediately following that of the Revolutionary Communist Party.

== International Marxist Tendency ==
Socialist Appeal was part of the then International Marxist Tendency (now the Revolutionary Communist International). In Latin America, it supported President of Venezuela's Hugo Chávez’s Bolivarian Revolution and the IMT instigated the formation of the Hands Off Venezuela campaign group to support Chávez.

The IMT ran the multilingual website In Defence of Marxism, which is now run by the RCI.

== See also ==
- Communism
- Far-left politics in the United Kingdom
- Leninism
- Trotskyism
