= Militant tendency =

Trotskyist group in the British Labour Party

Militant
- Leader: Collective leadership (Militant editorial board)
- Political Secretary: Ted Grant
- National Secretary: Peter Taaffe
- Founded: 1964; 62 years ago
- Dissolved: 1991; 35 years ago
- Preceded by: Revolutionary Socialist League
- Succeeded by: Militant Labour 1991–1997; Scottish Militant Labour 1991–1997; Socialist Party 1997–present; Socialist Alternative 2019–present; Socialist Appeal 1992–2024; Revolutionary Communist Party 2024–present
- Headquarters: Mentmore Terrace, London (1964–1984); Hepscott Road, London (1984–?)
- Newspaper: Militant
- Youth wing: Labour Party Young Socialists (controlled)
- Ideology: Marxism; Leninism; Trotskyism; Revolutionary socialism
- Political position: Far-left
- National affiliation: Labour Party (entryist group)
- International affiliation: Committee for a Workers' International
- Colours: Red

Website
- militant.org.uk

Militant Tendency, often known simply as Militant, was a Trotskyist group in the British Labour Party, organised around the Militant newspaper, which launched in 1964.

In 1975, there was widespread press coverage of a Labour Party report on the infiltration tactics of Militant. Between 1975 and 1980, attempts by Reg Underhill and others in the leadership of the Labour Party to expel Militant were rejected by its National Executive Committee, which appointed a Militant member to the position of National Youth Organiser in 1976 after Militant had won control of the party's youth section, the Labour Party Young Socialists.

After the Liverpool Labour Party adopted Militant's strategy to set an illegal deficit budget in 1982, a Labour Party commission found Militant in contravention of clause II, section 3 of the party's constitution which made political groups with their own "Programme, Principles and Policy for Separate and Distinctive Propaganda" ineligible for affiliation. Militant was proscribed by the Labour Party's National Executive Committee in December 1982 and the following year five members of the editorial board of the Militant newspaper were expelled from the Labour Party. At this point, the group claimed to have 4,300 members. Further expulsions of Militant activists followed. Militant policies dominated Liverpool City Council between 1983 and 1987 and the council organised mass opposition to government cuts to the rate support grant. Forty-seven councillors were banned and surcharged. The conduct of the Liverpool council led Neil Kinnock, Labour's leader, to denounce Militant at the 1985 Party Conference. Eventually, Militant's two remaining Labour MPs were deselected as Labour candidates at the 1992 general election.

Between 1989 and 1991, Militant led the All Britain Anti-Poll Tax Federation's non-payment campaign against the poll tax. In 1991, Militant decided by a large majority to abandon entryism in the Labour Party. Ted Grant, formerly the group's highest political authority, opposed this decision. Along with his supporters, he founded Socialist Appeal, which in 2024 developed into the Revolutionary Communist Party. The remaining majority changed its name to Militant Labour and then in 1997 to the Socialist Party.

== Early years ==
=== Origins ===
Militant's Trotskyist roots stretched back to the Workers International League in the 1930s and the post-war Revolutionary Communist Party.

The Revolutionary Socialist League was organised in 1957 around the newspaper Socialist Fight. About 40 strong, they were Labour Party members, mainly based in Liverpool, with small forces in London and in South Wales. The Militant newspaper was founded in 1964 after the National Secretary Jimmy Deane, together with Grant, Keith Dickenson, Ellis Hillman and others on the executive of the RSL, decided to wind up Socialist Fight and start another newspaper, initially as a four-page monthly. Peter Taaffe was appointed the first editor, and in 1965 became national secretary.

The name of the paper was the same as the American SWP publication The Militant, and as a result "most of the pioneers of Militant were not enthralled by the choice of the name" writes Taaffe. But "Militant did stand for what its proponents intended: the aim of winning in the first instance, the most conscious, combative, fighting, i.e. militant, sections of the working class." Some Trotskyists referred to the new group, still known internally as the Revolutionary Socialist League, as the Grantites after their leading theoretician Ted Grant.

The founders of Militant had roots in labour and trade union organisations, especially in the Merseyside area. Jimmy Deane, the first national secretary of Militant, was an electrician and shop convenor at Cammell Laird in Birkenhead who joined the Labour Party in 1937 and was one of the pioneers of Trotskyism in Merseyside. Taaffe joined the Labour Party in 1960, and "In the Labour Party I discovered radical, socialist, Marxist ideas and in the course of discussion and debate I accepted those ideas." Taaffe, together with Ted Mooney and other founding Militant supporters, participated in an apprentices' strike, leading apprentices in English Electric on Merseyside's East Lancashire Road.

=== Early editions of Militant ===
"Drive Out the Tories" was the headline of the first issue of Militant, published just before the general election of 1964 with an article written by the business editor, S. Mani. Below the Militant logo were the words "For Youth and Labour". Inside, above the editorial, was printed: "Militant. Editor: Peter Taaffe (Walton Young Socialists). All correspondence to the business manager: S. Mani". The addition of the "Walton Young Socialists" indicated the significance with which Taaffe and Militant viewed the young socialists, and began the practice of Militant members identifying themselves with their local Labour Party or trade union. With Taaffe in Liverpool, Roger Protz, Keith Dickinson, Ted Grant and others did most of the work on the first few issues.

In the editorial of the first issue of the Militant in October 1964, Taaffe made the strategy of entryism clear:

The job is to carry the message of Marxism to the ranks of the labour movement and to its young people. There is room for all tendencies in the labour movement, including the revolutionary Left. Above all the task is to gather together the most conscious elements in the labour movement to patiently explain the need for these policies on the basis of experience and events.

Following the 1964 general election, which the Labour Party won with a majority of four seats, Militant called for "No retreat by Labour" from its promises, urging the carrying out of its promised nationalisation of steel and urban land and calling on it to "take action against the big monopolies, combines and trusts which dominate the economy". Under the headline, "Another election 'pledge' broken", Militant denounced the increased spending on nuclear weapons and their retention by the Labour Party, contrary to its commitment to nuclear disarmament. The paper supported the trade union struggle against the Labour government's incomes policy. Militant argued that the only long-term solution to the problems facing working-class people was to end capitalism through a socialist transformation of society, nationally and internationally. In 1965, it demanded: "Nationalise the 400 Monopolies". In the meantime, Roger Protz had severed his connection with the group. A letter from Protz, written around this time, was leaked to The Observer newspaper a decade later. It recalls his experiences at an early Militant editorial board meeting:

We told Grant that he was hopelessly factional and sectarian, [and] that his attitude would strangle Militant [...] He began screaming and shouting, threatening that I had no rights at all as I wasn't active in RSL, hadn't proven myself, etc.

In 1969, the Labour government came into conflict with the trade unions over its In Place of Strife white paper which was later withdrawn. Militant's national secretary Taaffe outlined how "the trade union and Labour Movement scored a tremendous victory in forcing the Labour government to climb down over its proposed anti-trade union legislation" in the first issue of the Militant International Review (Autumn 1969), Militant's quarterly theoretical journal. Several strikes had taken place, the "first directly political strikes" in what threatened to be an "irreparable breach between the Labour leaders and their base in the Labour Movement".

Militant argued that the struggle between the Labour Party leadership and the trade unions arose from the poor economic performance of Britain compared to its competitors. For them, the "capitalist class" wished to make the working class pay for this "crisis" through a policy to restrict workers' incomes: "For a generation now British Capitalism has been in decline... The capitalists are responsible for this mess. But they want the burdens to be borne by the working class, while their fabulous profits continue to rise. They wanted the Labour government to impose an incomes policy."

In 1965, highly critical of the policies agreed at the Eighth World Congress of the Fourth International, the Militant tendency abandoned attempts to remain a section of this grouping. According to an internal document by Grant, the International considered Militant to have "a poorly functioning organization" and aligned itself instead with the International Marxist Group (IMG). By 1969, Militant had ceased to use the name Revolutionary Socialist League internally. In 1974, Militant founded the Committee for a Workers' International (CWI).

== 1970s ==
=== Growth and influence ===
In 1970, Militant bought premises belonging to the old Independent Labour Party. In September 1971, the Militant newspaper became fortnightly, although still just four pages, and in January 1972 it became weekly. By the end of 1972 it became an 8-page weekly.

By 1972, Militant supporters in the Labour Party Young Socialists (LPYS) had won a clear majority on its National Committee. In 1973, the Labour Party Young Socialists conference attracted one thousand delegates and visitors. Taaffe claims that Militant had 397 "organised supporters" in March 1973, but by July of the same year this "had grown to 464". In 1965, Militant had claimed 100 members, and in 1979 1,621. In 1973, the Labour Party abolished the 'proscribed list' of organisations which could affiliate to the Labour Party.

At the 1972 Labour Party Conference, a resolution moved and seconded by Militant supporters Pat Wall and Ray Apps was passed by 3,501,000 votes to 2,497,000. It demanded that the Labour government commit itself to enacting "an enabling bill to secure the public ownership of the major monopolies". Pat Wall, later an MP, asserted: "No power on earth can stop the organised labour movement!" and "called for Labour to win the workers to a programme of taking power by taking over the 350 monopolies which controlled 85 per cent of the economy". The conference agreed to call on the Labour Party executive:

[F]ormulate a socialist plan of production based on public ownership, with minimum compensation, of the commanding heights of the economy.

The Militant newspaper commented "This is an answer to those who argue for a slow, gradual, almost imperceptible progress towards nationalisation."

=== Labour Party and press responses to entryism ===
The Observer ran the first article on Militant, "Trot conspirators inside Labour Party", at the end of August 1975. Its author, Nora Beloff, wrote that Militant was a "party within a party".

Militant asserted the consonance of its policies with the decisions of the Labour Party conference, which, it said, demonstrated its legitimacy as a current in the Labour Party. "It is significant that all these attacks, particularly that of The Observer, do not deal with the ideas of Militant, openly expressed, which have a great tradition in the labour movement and are the continuation of the ideas of the pioneers of the labour movement and of Marx, Engels, Lenin and Trotsky," it commented in response at the beginning of September 1975.

The report of National Agent Reg Underhill into the activities of Militant was completed in November 1975, and was soon leaked. By a majority of 16 to 12, the Labour Party's National Executive Committee decided to take no action. Many on the NEC, then with a left-wing majority, were "determined not to allow a return to what they saw as the 'McCarthyism' of the past". The proscribed list had fallen into disuse and Ron Hayward, Labour Party General Secretary from 1972, claimed he burned the Labour Party central office files on left-wingers. In 1975 Eric Heffer, a member of the NEC, remarked "There have been Trotskyists in the Labour Party for thirty years". Tony Benn, frequently nicknamed 'Kerensky' by the leadership of Militant (Alexander Kerensky's provisional government was 'replaced' by the Bolsheviks), defended the group. In a television interview, Benn drew a parallel with the forged Zinoviev letter, and claimed the documents published by Underhill had come from the "intelligence service or wherever".

At the same time in late 1975, cabinet minister Reg Prentice, later a Conservative minister, was deselected by his Constituency Labour Party in Newham North East. Labour Party leader and Prime Minister Harold Wilson declared that "small and certainly not necessarily representative groups" had "secured a degree of power within a constituency", but according to journalist Andy McSmith it was "manifestly untrue" that Prentice's problems were caused by Militant, who had only a small presence in his constituency party. Prentice ultimately defected to the Conservative Party in 1977. Meanwhile, in December 1975, Militant suffered a setback when they lost control of the National Organisation of Labour Students to the mainstream left Clause Four Group.

After James Callaghan had taken over as Labour Party's Prime Minister in September 1976, two trade unionists on the right of the party, and Ron Hayward, the General Secretary, on Hayward's casting vote, decided to appoint Militant supporter Andy Bevan as the Labour Party's Young Socialist Youth Officer. Bevan had been a member of Reg Prentice's constituency and played a part in his removal. In December, the Labour Party National Executive Committee decided by a 15 to 12 majority to uphold the appointment, but with Callaghan's open disapproval. Forty members of the Parliamentary Labour Party condemned Bevan's appointment.

The Daily Express commented: "Just five men have Labour on the Trot... Express dossier of the unknowns behind the Red challenge to Jim." The Times carried three articles in early December 1976 and an editorial about the danger of the Militant tendency, which it exposed as wanting to "establish a group of MPs". Ted Grant, writing in Militant, was optimistic at the time: "This witch hunt will fail, among other reasons, because of the justified hatred and distrust of the Labour Party for the capitalist press and their day to day poisonous propaganda against the labour movement." Andy Bevan faced a demonstration from his Labour colleagues outside Transport House when he finally began his job in January 1977.

Militant general secretary Taaffe was interviewed by Michael Davie, a journalist for The Observer, for an article published on 19 December 1976:

"No country constitutes a genuinely democratic workers' state," Mr Taaffe said. He spoke of the "monstrous police apparatus" in Russia, and the dictatorships of China and Cuba. Why would not the same thing happen here, if everything was taken over by the state? "Because Britain has a long democratic tradition, and there is no possibility of a socialist society being attained here without the working class, and the middle class, being convinced of the necessity of the change." I left Mr Taaffe thinking that Militant and Andy Bevan between them have got Transport House over a barrel.

=== End of the 1970s ===
The Militant newspaper argued that the Labour Party lost the 1979 election due to anger at the £8 billion cuts carried out by the Labour government, following the crisis caused by international speculation on the pound and the subsequent visit by the International Monetary Fund. It also blamed the Labour government's fiscal restraint of 1978–9, which, it claimed, gave rise to the "Winter of Discontent" – a period of union struggle against the government's wage restraint in the winter of 1978–1979, prior to the general election. Later, Taaffe asserted:

[T]he Labour leadership, attempting to manage capitalism in a period of crisis, embarked on attacks on workers' living standards, in particular through a series of pay policies...Through their policies during 1974–9, the Labour leaders paved the way for Thatcher.

Militant opposed the Russian invasion of Afghanistan of December 1979, "not for abstract reasons, as [for example] a result of the so-called 'inviolability of frontiers' or 'aggression', but because of the damage this action caused to the consciousness of the workers of other countries." The Soviet government was "being totally hypocritical" and acting to defend its own interests. But in Militant itself, Ted Grant and Alan Woods argued that nevertheless, now the Russian troops were there they could not leave and allow the victory of the US-backed Mujahideen. "These tribesmen [are] 'dark masses', stuck in the gloom of barbarism." They further contended that, "The Russian bureaucracy and their Afghan supporters are, in effect, carrying through the tasks of the bourgeois democratic revolution in that country."

By the late 1970s, the Militant newspaper was a 16-page weekly, outlining its organisations policies, activities and campaigns. By the end of the 1970s, the Militant tendency was calling for the nationalisation of the top 250 monopolies, later 200, rather than 350 monopolies, because mergers were concentrating ownership further. Between 1975 and 1980, the Labour Party's National Executive Committee voted against expulsion.

== Militant in the 1980s ==
=== First actions by the Labour Party ===
Conscious of his own past, and those of others on the Labour left, Michael Foot, Labour's leader from 1980, was initially against taking any action against Militant. The situation in the Labour Party at the time eventually forced his hand. According to Dianne Hayter, quoting from her interview with (then) MP Ken Woolmer, the 'Group of Ten' Labour members met Foot in the Leader's Room before Prime Minister's Questions. According to Woolmer, they said that "unless he denounced Militant, and recognised that it was a deep cancer within the party, the parliamentary party was on the verge of deeply splitting and was going to come apart." In December 1981, a Labour Party National Executive Committee inquiry team was set up, led by Ron Hayward and David Hughes, then the party's national agent. The inquiry sent a series of questions to the Militant tendency. The Militant general secretary, Taaffe, told the inquiry that the Militant's Editorial board consisted of five people, with an additional sixty-four full-time staff.

The Hayward-Hughes inquiry, which reported in June 1982, found that Militant was guilty of breaking Clause II, section 3 of the Labour Party constitution. It took only one of the four parts of this passage to render an organisation incompatible with the Labour Party: "Programme, Principles and Policy for separate and distinctive propaganda, possessing branches in the constituencies; promoting their own candidates for public office; and, finally, owing allegiance to any political organisation situated abroad." In the words of the authors: "It is clear that the Militant Tendency is a well organised caucus[,] centrally controlled[,] operation within the Labour Party and it is equally clear that supporters of the Tendency are in control of the Labour Party Young Socialists at National and Regional level." Crick though, pointed out that numerous other groups within Labour left and right, had also broken the strictly worded constitution, such as Labour Solidarity, the Labour Co-ordinating Committee and the Campaign for Labour Party Democracy, but that "dislike of Militant" had developed "because it has breached the constitution so blatantly and, perhaps more importantly, so effectively".

The inquiry proposed the setting up of a register of non-affiliated groups who would be allowed to operate within the Labour Party. Hayward, according to Tam Dalyell, was thought to be unduly forgiving of Militant by some in the party, and while Hayward and Hughes agreed with Michael Foot's opposition to expulsions in his New Year message for 1982, they said that Militant would be ineligible for their proposed register. The group was given three months to conform to the party rules. Labour Weekly, the Labour Party's own newspaper, cast doubts on the viability of such a register, which it said would only work in an "atmosphere of co-operation" but that "There is no evidence that such an atmosphere exists."

In the July 1982 edition of London Labour Briefing, Jeremy Corbyn opposed expulsions of the organisation, saying that "If expulsions are in order for Militant, they should apply to us too." In the same year, he was the "provisional convener" of "Defeat the Witch-Hunt Campaign", based at Corbyn's then address. In September 1982, Militant held a special conference against the 'witch-hunt' at the Wembley Conference Centre at which Ken Livingstone spoke. An attendance was claimed of 1,622 delegates from Constituency Labour Parties and 412 trade union delegates plus visitors, At such mass rallies in this period, Militant displayed two huge banners at each side of the stage, one showing Marx and Engels, and the other showing Lenin and Trotsky.

An editorial in the September–October 1982 issue of New Socialist, the Labour Party's internal magazine, objected to the accusations against Militant:

The expulsion of leading Militant supporters [is] wrong. The Labour Party always has been a broad collection that includes Marxists amongst its ranks. The Militant tendency, drawing as it does upon Trotsky's critique of Stalinism, belongs to this Marxist tradition, and has a legitimate place within the Labour Party.

The charges being levelled against Militant that it is 'a party within a party' is one that can be levelled with equal justification against any other groups within the Labour Party on both the left and right...

The very existence of the Militant and other groups within the Labour Party is a source of strength rather than a weakness. By working for the adoption of alternative policies and candidates, they assist the democratic functioning of the party.

At the 1982 Labour Party Conference which followed, the Hayward-Hughes report was endorsed and Militant was declared ineligible for affiliation to the Labour Party. While most Labour Party constituencies were against the register, the motion was endorsed at the conference. Militant was finally proscribed by the Labour Party NEC in December after an 18–9 vote.

On 22 February 1983, after a 19 to 9 vote, Labour's National Executive Committee, decided to expel from the party the five members of Militant's Editorial Board, Taaffe, Grant, Keith Dickinson, Lynn Walsh and Clare Doyle. They appealed at the Labour Party national conference in October of that year. Two-thirds of constituency delegates voted against expulsions but the appeal of each member was lost when the unions cast their block votes in a card vote, 5,160,000 to 1,616,000 in each case except for that of Grant who got 175,000 extra votes in his favour. Lynn Walsh, in his failed appeal asserted: "Militant is not an organisation, it is not subsidiary or ancillary to any organisation outside the party ... Militant was proscribed as a result of an entirely one-sided inquiry which acted on McCarthyite reports and poison-pen letters from self-appointed snoopers."

Following the election defeat in 1983 the NEC agreed to ban sales of Militant at party meetings and the Militant tendency was prohibited from using party facilities. By 1986, 40 expulsions had taken place of Militant supporters in the ranks of the Labour Party.

=== Militant in Liverpool ===
In 1982, Liverpool District Labour Party had adopted Militant policies and the slogan "Better to break the law than break the poor" from the Poplar Rates Rebellion, claiming that cuts to Liverpool's Rate Support Grant meant that £30 million had been "stolen" from Liverpool by Margaret Thatcher's government. Militant supporters argued that a minority Labour Council should have set an illegal "deficit budget" in 1980, demanding money from the central government to balance the books.

In May 1983, despite negative press coverage, the Militant-led Labour Party gained the council from a coalition Conservative-Liberal administration on a swing of 12 seats in the local elections running on an ambitious regeneration strategy with a refusal to make above-inflation rent and rate increases. In the 1983 general election elections, Militant supporter Terry Fields won Liverpool Broadgreen.

In 1984, Liverpool City Council launched its Urban Regeneration Strategy to build 5,000 houses and other public works, cancelling 1,200 planned redundancies, creating 1,000 new jobs as well as abolishing office of Lord mayor.

In 1985, the council joined other left wing councils in the rate-capping rebellion, although only Liverpool and Lambeth refused to set a legal budget with Liverpool passing an illegal deficit budget on 14 June 1985, although the proposal for a general strike was never carried through.

After being advised by the District Auditor that the council would be unable to pay wages after November, the Labour group on the council decided in September 1985 to issue ninety-day notices to the 30,000 strong workforce. Militant said the redundancy notices were a "tactic" to buy time. A covering letter to council employees dated 19 September 1985, signed by council leader John Hamilton and his deputy Derek Hatton, explained that "this course of action provides the only way of providing wages and salaries until 18th December, 1985. ...[giving] the Government three months to negotiate with Labour representatives a just settlement to our financial crisis. If the Government recognises its responsibility then all notices will be withdrawn." Later, the Deputy Council leader Derek Hatton and Militant's national general secretary Taaffe saw the letter as a great error, although the Council set a legal budget in November 1985 after borrowing £30 million.

Labour Party leader Neil Kinnock used his leader's speech to the 1985 Party Conference to attack Militant's record in Liverpool saying, "you end in the grotesque chaos of a Labour council, a Labour council, hiring taxis to scuttle round the city handing out redundancy notices to its own workers." Labour MP Eric Heffer walked off the platform during the speech while Derek Hatton repeatedly shouted "lies" at Kinnock from the balcony, and later condemned "the rantings and ravings" contained in his speech.

Liverpool District Labour Party was suspended by the National Executive Committee in November 1985, which began an inquiry into the council's conduct, although a minority were opposed. The two MPs associated with Militant elected in 1983, Dave Nellist and Terry Fields, both increased their majorities in 1987, whilst long-standing Militant member Pat Wall was elected as a Labour MP in Bradford, together with a strong performance for Labour in Liverpool, led Militant to deny that its policies were unpopular together with left wing politicians not aligned with Militant such as Michael Meacher.

In Liverpool, the district auditor had charged the Militant-led 49 Liverpool city councillors £106,000. Their appeal to the House of Lords was lost in 1987 and an additional charge of £242,000 was imposed. The money was raised from donations from the Labour and trade union movement.

=== Peak influence ===
Michael Crick contends that, "For a number of reasons the years 1982 and 1983 probably saw Militant at its peak in terms of influence within the Labour Party." According to Crick, Militant was effectively Britain's fifth biggest party (after Labour, Conservative, Liberal and the SDP) in the early to mid 1980s. "Until then Militant was always able to count on the support of most of the broad coalition on the left of the party, though privately many left-wingers were very critical of Militant's tactics and politics". In 1983, two Militant supporters were elected as MPs: Terry Fields in Liverpool Broadgreen and Dave Nellist, in Coventry South East.

However, Crick points out that while Militant continued to dominate the agenda of the Labour Party's National Executive meetings, expulsions spread around the constituencies:

[A]mong them Stevenage, Rhondda, Sheffield Attercliffe, Gillingham, Faversham, Cardiff South, Warley West, Newcastle-under-lyme, Newcastle East, Wrekin, Mansfield, Ipswich, Chorley, Cannock and Burntwood, Eddisbury, Knowsley South, Bromsgrove, Wrexham, Llanelli and Havant. [...] What is especially interesting is that many of these constituency parties could not be described as particularly right-wing. [...] [B]y far the majority of them voted for Tony Benn, Eric Heffer and Dennis Skinner in the annual elections to the National Executive.

Blackburn CLP was the first local party to expel a Militant activist, in 1983, and the constituency MP Jack Straw was of the opinion that dealing with the group was necessary if the party was to win the next general election. Militant's membership kept growing though, at least until 1986, when it reached 8,100 plus, according to Crick, who cites internal figures, but adds a caveat that this figure may be inflated. Militant's public fund raising peaked in 1986. In 1964, it set a target of £500 in funds. In 1980 it raised £94,000. In 1985 and 1986 its Fighting Fund, together with two special appeals raised a total of £281,528 and £283,818 respectively. In the years 1987 to 1989 the figure was around £200,000, and in 1990, £182,677, in 1991, £154,801.

Militant's public events continued to grow even after its membership and fund raising had peaked. Its largest indoor event was a rally in the Alexandra Palace in 1988 attended by almost 8,000.

=== Position on feminism and gay rights ===
Militant has been cited as an example of opposition to gay rights initiatives within the Labour movement in the early 1980s, specifically within the context of reaction to the financial support given to gay rights groups by the Greater London Council under the leadership of Ken Livingstone. However, while Militant was present in Labour Party Women's sections, claiming forty delegates attended the Labour Party Women's conference in 1981, and claiming to be to the fore on women's issues, it opposed "bourgeois feminism" which blamed men for women's oppression. The Militant newspaper published a back page issue supporting the June 1990 Pride march with the banner headline "Stop The Attacks".

== Poll tax ==
In 1988, Prime Minister Margaret Thatcher began preparations for a Community Charge to replace the council rates. Instead of one payment per household based on rateable value of the property, the poll tax was to be paid by all people who were 18 or over. While the Labour Party conference, in the autumn of 1988, had rejected a campaign of non-payment, Militant argued for a strategy of non-payment and supporting Anti-Poll Tax Unions, beginning in Scotland. Grant had opposed this option, arguing that Militant's MPs should pay the poll tax, partly for the group's self-protection, but was overruled.

The anti-poll tax unions grew during 1989, and soon regional and national bodies were set up, which Militant organised and led. The All Britain Anti-Poll Tax Federation called a demonstration in London on 31 March 1990 which led to a riot in Trafalgar Square. Non-payment rose to 17.5 million people in serious arrears, and central government began to consider the community charge unworkable. The poll tax was swiftly abandoned by the new Prime Minister John Major. Thatcher called the victory "One of the greatest victories for these people ever conceded by a Conservative Government." The last issue of Militant, 31 January 1997, claimed that the Anti-Poll Tax movement brought down Thatcher herself. Taaffe claimed in The Rise of Militant that "It was the 18 million non-payers of the poll tax who were decisive in her [Thatcher's] downfall. Facing electoral massacre if she remained, Tory MPs brought her down after eleven years in power."

Militant MP Terry Fields was criticised by the Labour leader Neil Kinnock for the non-payment of his poll-tax when Fields was imprisoned for 60 days in July 1991 for refusing to pay his £373 poll tax bill. Kinnock said at the time: "Law makers must not be law breakers. I have always made that clear". According to Militant, 219 members had been expelled from the Labour Party by August 1991, but by now most Militant members were drawing the conclusion that their way forward was blocked in the Labour Party.

== Open turn ==
In April 1991, Militant decided to support the setting up of Scottish Militant Labour, an independent organisation in Scotland. At the same time, it decided to support independent Broad Left candidates in Liverpool standing against the official Labour Party. All five Broad Left candidates won in the May 1991 local elections. Eric Heffer, MP for Liverpool Walton died in May 1991, and the Broad Left decided to stand Militant supporter Lesley Mahmood as the candidate of "Real Labour" at the subsequent by-election. Militant endorsed the decision, but the Militant executive Ted Grant and Rob Sewell opposed it. Mahmood came third, just saving her deposit. It was the group's first electoral step outside the Labour Party.

Majority and Minority resolutions were presented to the Militant National Editorial Board meeting of 14–16 July 1991 on the question of this "open turn", and a faction formed around Ted Grant's Minority position. The National Editorial Board comprised representatives from all regions and areas of work of Militant, and functioned as a National Executive Committee. The Majority resolution, in support of the open work, was agreed by 46 votes to 3, whilst the Minority one was defeated 3 to 43 at the 14–16 July 1991 meeting. Documents from each faction were subsequently circulated.

The Minority argued that this turn from work in the Labour Party was a "threat to 40 years work", and that "only about 250" supporters had been expelled, out of a membership which in the late 1980s had numbered 8,000. They argued that it was irresponsible to endanger this work in view of an anticipated swing to the left in the Labour Party. "The classical conditions for entrism will undoubtedly arise during the next epoch – two, three, five or even ten years – as the crisis of world capitalism, and especially British capitalism, unfolds."

The Majority did not dispute the numbers expelled. It argued "we face a profoundly changed situation". The Labour leadership's policies and methods "have led to a severe decline in the level of activity within the [Labour] party...Marxists are tolerated within the party only where they do not pose a threat at the moment". The Labour Party Young Socialists had been closed:

In the early to mid-eighties, we had fifty to seventy delegates to the Labour Party annual conference, and we dominated many of the key debates. By 1987–88, this had been reduced to between thirty and forty delegates, and is currently down to a small handful. This has not come about because of any deliberate withdrawal from work within the constituencies. It reflects the decline in activity within the CLPs and the witch-hunt against our comrades.

At a special conference of Militant in October 1991, after a lengthy period of debate and discussion, 93% of delegates voted to support the "Scottish turn". They supported the view that because there was "a blockage within the Labour Party, created by the Kinnock leadership at the present time, we have to continue to develop independent work and not allow our distinct political identity to be submerged through fear of expulsions." In Scotland, it supported "a bold, open detour in order to strengthen our forces."

=== Subsequent events ===
In 1991, Militant tendency left the Labour Party and changed its name to Militant Labour. Ted Grant and Alan Woods of the Minority, were expelled, although Militant asserted they had set up an alternative organisation and so had departed, noting: "We regret that Ted Grant has split in this way. He made a vital contribution in upholding the genuine ideas of Marxism". Pat Wall MP died in 1990. Terry Fields was expelled from the Labour Party in December 1991, and Dave Nellist, the remaining Militant MP, was deselected by the Labour Party NEC. Standing as an Independent Labour candidate in 1992, Nellist lost his seat to Labour's Jim Cunningham, with Nellist gaining 40 fewer votes than the Conservative candidate, and 28.88% of the votes cast.

Meanwhile, in Glasgow Tommy Sheridan the leader of the Scottish Anti-Poll Tax Federation had been sentenced to six months in prison for being present at, and helping to prevent, a Warrant Sale (public sale of a debtor's possessions by Sheriff Officers) after a court order had been issued prohibiting his attendance. While incarcerated, Sheridan stood at the 1992 General Election as a Scottish Militant Labour candidate for the Pollok constituency, and came second with 6,287 votes (19.3%). A month later, in the Scottish local elections he was elected to the City of Glasgow District Council while in prison, being elected for the Pollok ward.

In 1997, Militant Labour changed its name to the Socialist Party of England and Wales, and the Militant newspaper was renamed The Socialist. Between 1998 and January 2001 the Scottish section of the Committee for a Workers' International (CWI), Scottish Militant Labour, proposed the formation of the Scottish Socialist Party with a number of other groups, together with a change in the political character of the Scottish section. They remain a section of the CWI.

The minority faction from the 1991 split in Militant, led by Ted Grant, Alan Woods, and Rob Sewell created a new organisation around the magazine Socialist Appeal (now The Communist). The magaziner was edited by Woods, then Sewell. The magazine later became a tabloid monthly newspaper, then a fortnightly. The group helped to create the Revolutionary Communist International, initially called the Committee for a Marxist International, and which claims sections in 26 countries making it one of the largest Fourth Internationals.

== Analysis ==
=== Historical significance ===
Scholarly analysis identifies Militant as "the most successful entrist faction in Labour's history" and describes it as "effectively Britain's fifth most important political party" during the 1980s. Academic research emphasises that despite "inauspicious beginnings", Militant achieved unprecedented success in implementing Trotskyist entryism tactics within a major democratic socialist party.

The movement's growth trajectory demonstrates the potential for organised factions within democratic parties: membership expanded from 100 in 1965 to 1,621 in 1979, reaching approximately 8,100 by 1986. Historians note that by the 1970s, "the Militant Tendency's pursuit of entrism began to bear some fruit with the group taking effective control of the Labour Party Young Socialists in 1970 and over constituency politics in Liverpool by the early 1980s".

Militant's success in Liverpool represents a unique case study in radical municipal politics. The council's Urban Regeneration Strategy, which built 5,000 houses and created 1,000 jobs while opposing central government cuts, demonstrated how far-left groups could implement policy at the local level. Political scientist Eric Shaw argues that Liverpool showed both the potential and limitations of confrontational municipal socialism in the Thatcher era.

=== Contemporary scholarly perspectives ===
Recent academic work has reframed understanding of Militant's expulsion from the Labour Party. Rather than simply viewing it as organisational housekeeping, scholars now analyse it as "primarily a battle of metaphor and semantics", involving "the successful construction of Militant as Labour's unwanted and malignant 'other'". This research identifies five central discursive strategies used to justify exclusion: medical, sub-human, emotional, ideological, and historical frameworks for "othering".

Intelligence historians have revealed that Militant became the first Trotskyist organisation considered a serious subversive threat by MI5. Research using newly released National Archives files shows that between the late 1970s and early 1980s, security services viewed Militant as potentially more dangerous than the Communist Party of Great Britain. This reflects Militant's unique success in penetrating mainstream political institutions compared to other far-left groups.

Contemporary analysis also emphasises Militant's role in broader patterns of party modernisation. Political historian Martin Pugh argues that the campaign against Militant was part of Labour's transformation from a "broad church" coalition to a more disciplined, professionalised party. Some scholars contend that the methods used against Militant provided a template for later factional conflicts within Labour, including during the Tony Blair and Jeremy Corbyn eras.

The international dimension of Militant's influence has received increased scholarly attention. Research shows that through the Committee for a Workers' International, Militant's tactical innovations influenced Trotskyist parties across Europe and beyond, making it "one of the most significant Trotskyist organisations of the late twentieth century".

=== Critical perspectives ===
Some critics have argued that Militant's significance was exaggerated and that the group served as a convenient target for Labour Party modernisation efforts. Tribune magazine has suggested that Militant became the "favourite punching bag of the press" and that Neil Kinnock's attacks on the group were strategically motivated to demonstrate his commitment to modernising Labour by publicly distancing himself from radical left elements. This view contends that the focus on Militant may have been disproportionate to their actual political threat.

Critics point to Militant's ultimate failures, particularly in Liverpool, where their control of the city council resulted in the issuing of redundancy notices to 30,000 workers and what Kinnock famously described as "grotesque chaos". The Liverpool experience arguably damaged Labour's electoral prospects and provided ammunition for Conservative attacks on the party's competence in local government.

== See also ==
- History of the Labour Party (UK)
- Momentum (organisation)
- Socialism in the United Kingdom
- Socialist Workers Party (UK)
- Hard Left
- List of Labour Party breakaway parties (UK)
