= Labour League of Youth =

Former youth wing of the Labour Party (UK)

The Labour League of Youth (LLY) was the youth organisation of the British Labour Party from 1926 to 1960, when it was replaced by the Young Socialists. In the 1930s, it included far left elements, such as Trotskyists and Communists, with its chairman, Ted Willis, working with and later joining and becoming secretary of the Young Communist League. After the Second World War, the League was more tightly controlled by the party. The organisation accepted members from the ages of 16 to 25.

== Successors ==
- Labour Party Young Socialists
- Young Labour (UK)
