= Labour Party Young Socialists =

Former youth section of the British Labour Party

- Founded: 1960
- Preceded by: League of Youth
- Dissolved: 1991
- Succeeded by: Young Labour
- Headquarters: London
- Ideology: Democratic socialism Social democracy
- Colours: Red
- Mother party: Labour Party
- International affiliation: International Union of Socialist Youth (IUSY)
- European affiliation: Young European Socialists (ECOSY)

The Labour Party Young Socialists (LPYS) was the youth section of the Labour Party in Britain from 1965 until 1991. In the 1980s, it had around 600 branches, 2,000 delegates at its national conferences and published a monthly newspaper, Left, later Socialist Youth. From the early 1970s, it was led by members of Militant.

== Origins ==
The Labour Party has had several youth sections. In the 1930s, the Labour League of Youth had 30,000 members. The League took a highly critical stance towards the leadership of the Party and was closed down in 1954.

Youth sections continued in some constituencies, however, for instance in Liverpool Walton where there was longstanding entryism from supporters of Ted Grant's Trotskyist faction, which later became the Revolutionary Socialist League. The Walton youth section published Rally, said to stand for "Read All About the Labour League of Youth".

In 1960, a new Labour youth organisation was set up, called the Young Socialists. In 1965, this was renamed the Labour Party Young Socialists.

== Early political affiliations ==
From the outset, the Young Socialists organisation saw conflict between Trotskyist entryist groups that published the paper Young Guard and a group that published a rival paper, Keep Left, which formed the leadership. Both groups came from the Trotskyist tradition, but their methods and ideas differed considerably.

Keep Left was published by the Socialist Labour League, a Trotskyist group led by Gerry Healy, until the League took its supporters out of the Labour Party in 1964–65. The Socialist Labour League became the Workers Revolutionary Party, which maintained its own Young Socialists section until 1985. It was after the departure of the Keep Left group that the Young Socialists organisation was renamed LPYS.

The publication Young Guard was a collaboration between the International Socialists (IS) and the Revolutionary Socialist League (RSL), known from 1964 as the Militant group. The RSL, which had produced Rally in Walton, also published Socialist Fight, while before Young Guard the IS had supported a smaller publication, Rebel. By 1963, however, the faltering collaboration had ended, and the Militant was set up in 1964. The Young Guard was continued for a time by the IS alone, but it was discontinued by 1966, and the IS left the Labour Party and LPYS in 1967-68.

== Militant leadership ==
For a while there was no one group controlling the LPYS National Committee, to which regional bodies elected representatives, usually at regional conferences. Instead, traditional left and right were brought together by the YS Action Committee, chaired by Bill Withnall from Walsall, and organised by its secretary Peter Kent from Crewe. Centred on the West Midlands region, which was described by The Sunday Telegraph as a "hotbed of moderation", it nonetheless drew support from all regions to counter the entryist tactics of the Militant tendency. Peter Kent represented the North West Region on the LPYS National Committee from 1966 to 1968, and was followed by Roger Stott from Rochdale.

However, during the late 1960s the Militant tendency began to win significant numbers of resolutions at the LPYS National Conference. In 1969, resolutions moved by Militant supporters won majorities on all issues except the question of the United Nations, and in 1970 all resolutions moved by Militant supporters were passed, although in order to be passed they had also to be supported by other groups. By 1972, the Militant tendency had gained a majority on the LPYS National Committee.

The membership of the Labour Party in general moved to the left in the 1970s, and resolutions put to the party's National Executive Committee (NEC) seeking action against Militant were defeated. An LPYS representative was given a place on the NEC, which also employed a Militant tendency Youth Officer, Andy Bevan.

Under the leadership of the Militant tendency the LPYS grew rapidly, reaching a high point of 581 branches in 1985, and organising demonstrations and protests against the Thatcher government. Its monthly journal throughout this period was called Socialist Youth, and was edited by John Hird.

== Reorganisation under Neil Kinnock ==
The Labour Party's student wing, the National Organisation of Labour Students (NOLS), had a majority from the Clause IV group, which had defeated the Militant tendency within NOLS in December 1975. By then many Labour leaders and staff had been members of NOLS, and had experience of clashing with Militant. They now saw no reason why a social democratic party should play host to an "entryist" organisation with a different ideology. When Neil Kinnock became Labour leader in 1983 the battle stepped up and after 1985 Kinnock made it clear that he was determined to expel the Militant. In 1986, the Labour Party's Annual Conference decided to reorganise the LPYS. In 1987, the Party removed most of the LPYS elected structures, including its National Conference, and reduced its upper age limit from 26 to 23. Reducing the age limit made most of the LPYS's leadership ineligible for membership of the organisation, since most of them were over 23 by the time they had gained enough experience to become leaders of the LPYS. By 1990, the number of LPYS branches had fallen to 52.

The LPYS continued until 1991, when the Labour conference supported a motion to set up Young Labour, proposed by Tom Watson (later a Labour MP), seconded by Brian Whitington, then Chair of the LPYS (later Labour candidate in Twickenham in 2005) and supported by Claire Ward, then the Youth Representative on the NEC (and later a Labour MP).

== LPYS NEC Representatives ==
- 1972–1974—Peter Doyle
- 1974– Rose Degiorgio
- 1974–1978—Nick Bradley
- 1978–1981—Tony Saunois
- 1981–1983—Laurence Coates
- 1983–1984—Steve Morgan
- 1984–1986— Frances Curran
- 1986– 1988— Linda C. Douglas
- 1988–1989—Hannah Sell
