= Tamil Solidarity =

- Formation: 2009
- Purpose: To fight for the rights of workers and all oppressed people in Sri Lanka
- Headquarters: London, United Kingdom
- Region served: International
- International Coordinator: TU Senan
- Website: www.tamilsolidarity.org

Tamil Solidarity, formerly the Stop the Slaughter of Tamils (SST), is a leftist activist group fighting for the rights of Tamils in Sri Lanka. It was formed in 2009 in Chennai, India during the war in Sri Lanka when thousands of Tamils were killed. It has been campaigning for the Tamil cause including in the European parliament.
