= Ted Grant =

Founder-leader of Militant then Socialist Appeal

- Grant in 1985
- Born: Isaac Blank; 9 July 1913; Germiston, Province of Transvaal, Union of South Africa
- Died: 20 July 2006 (aged 93); London, England
- Occupations: Political theorist, writer, activist
- Movement: Militant (United Kingdom), International Marxist Tendency
- Website: www.tedgrant.org

Edward Grant (born Isaac Blank; 9 July 1913 – 20 July 2006) was a South African-born Trotskyist who spent most of his adult life in Britain. He was a founding member of the group Militant and later Socialist Appeal.

== Early life ==
Grant was born in Germiston, South Africa. His autobiography referred to him as "Isaac Blank" but it is unclear if this was his real name as he preferred secrecy in order to protect his family.

His father, Max Blank, was a Lithuanian Jewish emigré from Tauragė (Tovrig in Yiddish), who was involved in the mineral business, and his mother, Adelle, was originally from the Parisian district of Le Marais. They had two sons, Isaac and Isador, and three daughters, Rose, Rachael and Zena.

His parents divorced and he was brought up by his mother who took in lodgers to supplement her income. He was introduced to Trotskyism by one of these lodgers, Ralph Lee, a leader in the Bolshevik-Leninist League to which Lee would later recruit him. In 1934, Grant left South Africa for Britain, changing his name to Edward Grant in the process. Before reaching the UK he stopped over in France to meet Leon Trotsky's son, Lev Sedov. Once in Britain, he joined the Marxist Group, an entryist group in the Independent Labour Party. He took part in the anti-fascist Battle of Cable Street in 1936.

In 1935, the Johannesburg-based Bolshevik-Leninist League joined with a similar group in Cape Town to form the Workers Party of South Africa. In 1937, after a series of factional difficulties and accusations of financial misconduct, Lee and several of his supporters left South Africa and joined Grant in England in the Militant Group (an entrist group in the Labour Party which Grant and others joined after leaving the Marxist Group). Factional accusations against Lee would follow him from South Africa, resulting in Lee and his supporters, including Grant, being expelled from the group in 1938.

== Political activities ==
The former Militant Group members formed the Workers' International League. The group grew, and in 1941, he became editor of its paper. He continued his role in the fused Revolutionary Communist Party. In 1945, Ted Grant, together with Jock Haston and others, argued that there would be a new but limited period of economic expansion of the 1950s and 1960s in the west. This contrasted with the perspectives of the American Socialist Workers Party led by James Cannon in 1945.

Following the breakup of the RCP, Grant joined Gerry Healy's faction, but was soon expelled for failing to support other expulsions. He formed a new, small Marxist Tendency engaged in Labour Party entryism. Later named the Revolutionary Socialist League, it was recognised as the official British section of the Fourth International between 1957 and 1965. In 1964 it founded the newspaper Militant.

By the 1980s, the group was known as the Militant tendency and had become a significant force in the Labour Party, having successfully taken control of the Labour Party Young Socialists since 1972, and infiltrated constituency parties electing two of its members Labour MPs. As well, Militant in Liverpool had taken control of the Labour Party in that city as well as of Liverpool City Council resulting in high-profile confrontations with the Thatcher government as well as the national Labour Party leadership.

Grant was, along with others from the group, expelled from the Labour Party in 1983 while many members of Militant were later expelled under Neil Kinnock after the Left lost control of the party machinery.

== Expulsion from Militant ==
2026 painting of Grant

At the end of the 1980s, Militant was active in the anti-Poll Tax movement against the Thatcher government's Community Charge (popularly known as the poll tax). Meanwhile, there was a growing faction which believed that continuing support for the Labour Party was impeding the growth of the tendency. Grant worried that his organisation was shifting away from interpreting Trotsky's theories and indulging in "activism"; he had argued that Militant's MPs should pay the poll tax to protect the group. A debate arose within Militant: Peter Taaffe and his supporters argued in favour of abandoning the entryist tactic, and instead began standing candidates against the Labour Party, first in the 1991 Liverpool Walton by-election and then in the 1992 general election in Liverpool and Scotland. Ted Grant opposed these developments and, after a special national conference confirmed the decision to leave the Labour Party, Grant was expelled from Militant along with Alan Woods in 1992.

Following their expulsion Grant and Woods started a new group inside the Labour Party known by the name of its publication Socialist Appeal. The split also left Grant and his supporters outside the Committee for a Workers' International (CWI), but he and Woods were able to found the Committee for a Marxist International (now called the Revolutionary Communist International) with international supporters.

== See also ==
- Tony Cliff and Gerry Healy – two other former RCP members who went on to found prominent rival Trotskyist parties
