= Revolutionary Socialist League (UK, 1956) =

- General Secretary: Jimmy Deane
- Founded: 1950
- Dissolved: 1964
- Split from: The Club
- Succeeded by: Militant
- Newspaper: Workers International Review (1956–1957); Socialist Fight (1958–1963)
- Ideology: Socialism; Trotskyism
- Political position: Far-left
- International affiliation: Fourth International

The Revolutionary Socialist League (RSL) was a Trotskyist group in Britain which existed from 1950 until 1964 when it became Militant, an entryist group in the Labour Party.

The group was founded by Ted Grant and his supporters. Initially a tendency that was expelled from The Club in 1950, the group officially became the RSL in 1957. The RSL became the Militant tendency in 1964.

== Formation ==
In 1950 Ted Grant and his supporters were expelled from the Revolutionary Communist Party's successor The Club, forming their own tendency, the International Socialist Group. The group was attached to the International Secretariat of the Fourth International and was renamed to the Revolutionary Socialist League in 1957, after merging with the Committee for the Regroupment of the Fourth International in Britain.

The RSL held its first congress in 1957, having been recognised as the British section of the Fourth International (ISFI).

The group's was an entryism group within the Labour Party that also published Socialist Fight. This position was justified by Grant via an 1959 article where he revised Trotsky's idea of entryism, seeing it as a long-term strategy instead. His reasoning was: "All history demonstrates that, at the first stages of revolutionary upsurge, the masses turn to the mass organisations to try and find a solution for their problems".

In 1961, the International Group split from the RSL, then rejoined in 1964 and then split again to form the International Marxist Group.

However, the League registered substantial political differences at the 1965 World Congress, and failed to integrate other supporters of the International in Britain. The Congress recognised two sympathising sections in Britain: the RSL and what became the International Marxist Group, prompting the RSL to turn its back on the International. In 1964, the RSL founded the newspaper Militant. the group soon became known by this name, although the official name was still used internally.

Preceded by The Club (Trotskyist)	British Section of the Fourth International; 1957–1964	Succeeded by International Marxist Group
