= Pakistan Trade Union Defence Campaign =

Pakistani workers' campaign

PTUDC
- Pakistan Trade Union Defence Campaign
- پاکستان ٹریڈ یونین ڈیفنس کمپئین
- Founded: 1996
- Headquarters: Lahore, Pakistan
- Location: Pakistan
- Key people: Lal Khan, ex-International Secretary; Umar Shahid, Organizer
- Website: https://socialistmiddleeast.com

The Pakistan Trade Union Defence Campaign (PTUDC) is an international solidarity campaign for Pakistani workers.

== History ==
In 1995, Arif Shah, a leading trade union leader, was assassinated. Following his assassination, the Punjab Labour Federation, the United Labour Federation, the Progressive Workers Alliance, the Railway Workers Union, and the National Union of Postal Employees jointly launched the PTUDC.

== Work ==
The PTUDC declares its views and aims in response to the need for working-class military in Pakistan. It is against privatization and proposes the complete nationalization of industry, in order to put it under the democratic control of workers.

Two of its members were arrested while distributing leaflets to oppose privatization in Karachi. It is working to ensure safe working conditions and to demand better facilities for workers. It holds various events to publicize worker struggle.

In 2005, Pakistani Kashmir was hit by an earthquake. PTUDC had set up relief camps and demanded a hefty tax to be imposed on all capitalists so that money could be generated for rehabilitation. PTUDC established affiliated support groups in Europe, the US and Canada. Jeremy Corbyn attended its solidarity meeting in London.

In May 2018 PTUDC, along with 16 other progressive organisations, established the Lahore Left Front. The Lahore Left Front hosted the Pashtun Tahafuz Movement public meeting at Lahore on 22 April 2018.

== Platform ==
Its platform is as follows:

- Defence of trade unions from physical attacks of employers
- Defence of the right to organize
- Stop the privatization of state industries; re-nationalize those privatized firms under workers’ control
- The establishment of a minimum living wage for all, linked to the cost of living
- The abolition of child labour
- Free education and healthcare

== Publications ==
Monthly journal Mazdoornama is the official organ of PTUDC.
