= Spanish school students' union =

Student Organisation in Spain

Sindicato de Estudiantes
- Formation: 1986
- Headquarters: c\Hermanos del Moral 33 bajo A, 28019 Madrid
- Key people: Tohil Delgado, President Ana Garcia, General Secretary
- Website: www.sindicatodeestudiantes.net

The Spanish school students' union is a student organization in Spain. It organises students in compulsory secondary education, baccalaureate, professional and university education; both public and private. It holds 3 of the 8 student representative seats in the State School Board. It was founded in 1986 by members of the organization currently called Izquierda Revolucionaria. Its legal status comes from Organic Law of Education of the Organic Law of the Right to Education.

== Privatisation ==
Ana Garcia has blamed privatisation for the spread of corruption in the university sector.

== Misogyny ==
The union called a student strike on 10 May 2018 in protest against what it saw as the sexism of the judiciary in the La Manada sexual abuse case
