= Young Labour (UK) =

Youth wing of the British Labour Party

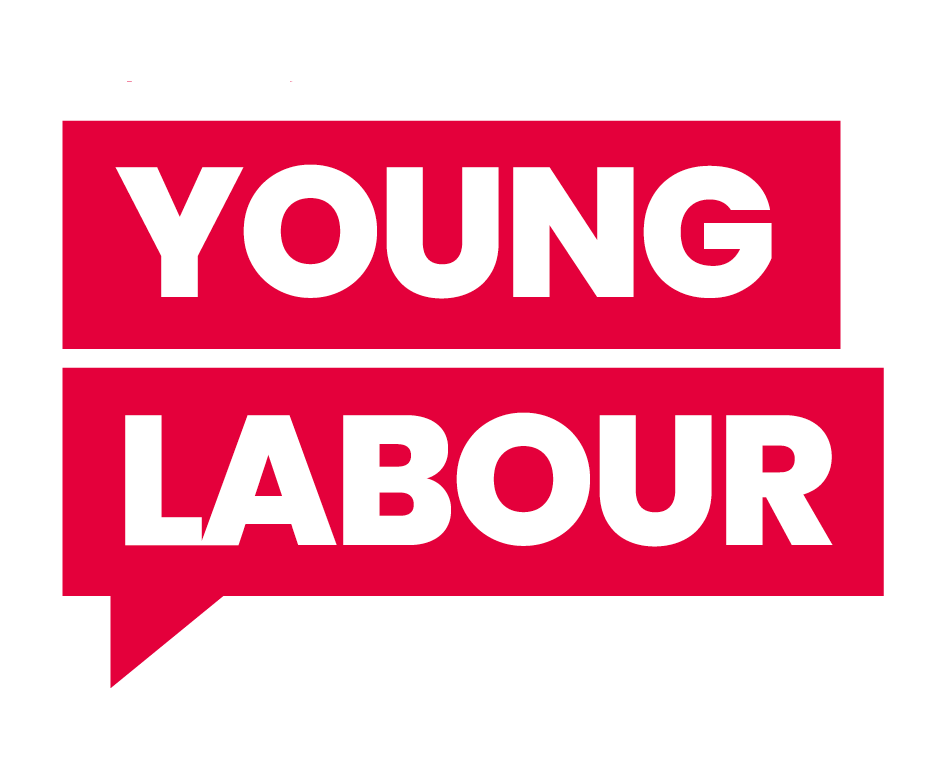
- Chair: Emily Moore
- Vice Chair: Maddy O'Brien & Ben Hobbs
- Founded: 1993
- Preceded by: Labour Party Young Socialists
- Headquarters: London
- Membership: 30,000 (January 2025)
- Colours: Red
- Mother party: Labour Party
- International affiliation: International Union of Socialist Youth (IUSY)
- European affiliation: Young European Socialists (YES)
- Website: younglabour.org.uk

Young Labour is the youth section of the UK Labour Party. Membership is automatic for Labour Party members aged 14 to 26.

It exists to engage young people in the Labour Party and ensure that their aspirations are reflected in Labour's policies in power. Young Labour members are able to get involved in the Labour Party through local policy events, campaigning or by attending events and social gatherings.

Young Labour hosts an annual conference, alternating between national committee elections and policy conferences every other year. Young Labour also holds a range of additional national events, including fringe sessions at the annual Labour Party Conference through a dedicated Youth Day, available at a discount to young members.

Young Labour is affiliated to both the International Union of Socialist Youth (IUSY) and Young European Socialists (YES).

== History ==
Throughout much of the 20th century, younger members of the Labour party were represented first by the Labour League of Youth and later by the Labour Party Young Socialists. These organisations often positioned themselves on the left of the party and frequently had a difficult relationship with its leadership. The latter of these groups went into decline in the late 1980s after reforms were made to make it more manageable and closed down entirely in 1991.

Young Labour was founded in 1993 by a Labour Party annual conference motion in Brighton, proposed by Tom Watson, seconded by Brian Whitington, then Chair of the Labour Party Young Socialists, and supported by then National Executive Committee Youth Representative Claire Ward.

== Membership ==
Members of the Labour Party aged 14 to 26 are automatically members of Young Labour.

In January 2020, Young Labour had over 100,000 members. In January 2025, its membership had decreased to 30,000.

== Structure ==
=== Young Labour National Committee ===
The Young Labour National Committee acts as the governing body of the organisation. It includes a chair, the National Executive Committee (NEC) youth rep, an international officer, an under-18s representative, four liberation officers, 10 trade union reps, three National Labour Students reps, one socialist society rep, 11 national and regional reps, and the chair of the Co-operative Party Youth Committee. In addition, the Labour Party appoints a permanent secretary to act as non-voting facilitator, and the National Policy Forum youth reps appoint a vice chair (policy).

Upon the first meeting of each new Young Labour National Committee, two vice-chairs are elected by the body of the full national committee. These two vice-chairs, along with the elected Chair of Young Labour act as the Executive Committee.

=== Chair of Young Labour ===
Between 1991 and 2009, the Chair of Young Labour was appointed by the Labour Party. Reforms passed by the Labour Party's annual conference saw the creation of a democratically elected chair, voted for by delegates at Young Labour's national conference, to serve a two-year term. The first election took place in 2009. In late 2017, the Labour Party's NEC changed the system so that the Chair of Young Labour is elected by a one-member-one-vote ballot of young members. It was reported that over 7,000 young members voted in the 2018 election.

==== Elected chairs of Young Labour ====
- 2009–2011: Sam Tarry
- 2011–13: Susan Nash
- 2013–16: Simon Darvill
- 2016–18: Caroline Hill
- 2018–2020: Miriam Mirwitch
- 2020–2022: Jessica Barnard
- 2022–2024: Nabeela Mowlana
- 2024–2026: Jack Lubner
- 2026–2028: Emily Moore

=== National Executive Committee Youth Rep ===
Delegates at Young Labour's national conference also elected the Youth Rep to sit on the Labour Party's NEC. The election operated under an electoral college, with a third of the vote for young member delegates, a third for Labour Students delegates, and a third for delegates from affiliated trade unions and socialist societies.

For the 2018 election, the system was changed, with half of the vote allocated to young members through a one-member-one-vote ballot and half allocated to block votes by affiliated trade unions and socialist societies.

- 1991–1995: Claire Ward
- 1995–1997: Catherine Taylor
- 1997–1999, Sarah Ward
- 1999–2001: Claire McCarthy
- 2001–2003: Blair McDougall
- 2003–2005: Jonathan Reynolds
- 2007–2011: Stephanie Peacock
- 2011–2013: Callum Munro
- 2013–2016: Bex Bailey
- 2016–2018: Jasmin Beckett
- 2018–2022: Lara McNeill
- Since 2022: Elsie Greenwood

=== Membership fee ===
The national Labour Party membership fee for under-27s was reduced to one penny in December 2010; this fee lasted until May 2011. The fee has reverted to £1 for the first year of membership, with subsequent years charged at the standard rate.

== See also ==
- Young Conservatives, the young wing of the Conservative Party
- Young Liberals, the youth wing of the Liberal Democrats
- Young Greens, the youth wing of the Green Party of England and Wales
