= Committee for a Workers' International =

International association of Trotskyist political parties

- Comité por una Internacional de los Trabajadores; Comité pour une internationale ouvrière
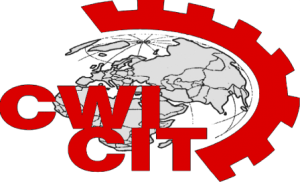
- Abbreviation: CWI (English), CIT (Spanish), CIO (French)
- Successor: International Socialist Alternative (disputed); Committee for a Workers' International (refounded) (disputed)
- Formation: 21 April 1974
- Dissolved: 2019
- Type: Association of Trotskyist political parties and organisations
- Headquarters: London, England
- Region served: Worldwide
- Members: 30 affiliated groups (2017)
- Secessions: Revolutionary Communist International

The Committee for a Workers' International (CWI; Spanish: Comité por una Internacional de los Trabajadores, CIT; French: Comité pour une internationale ouvrière, CIO) was an international association of Trotskyist political parties and organisations. Today, two groups claim to be the continuation of the CWI, the refounded Committee for a Workers' International and International Socialist Alternative.

== History ==
=== Founding ===
The origins of the CWI can be traced to a group of British Trotskyists which were expelled from the USFI in 1965, after disagreements regarding the Colonial Revolution, Guerillaism, Studentism and the post war boom. But it is not till 1974 that they set about building an international. The founding conference of the CWI was held in London on 20 to 21 April 1974 and attended by supporters of what was then called Militant (or the Militant tendency), from 12 countries including Britain, Ireland and Sweden. In the early years of the international, sections generally pursued a policy of entryism into social democratic or labour parties. As such, the CWI was originally secretive because to organise openly risked the expulsion of its sections from the parties in which they were working.

=== End of entryism ===
The CWI largely ended its strategy of entryism in the early 1990s. The international developed an analysis that many social democratic parties had fundamentally changed in nature and become outright capitalist parties, their main example being the UK Labour Party. This was strongly resisted by Ted Grant, one of Militant's founders. After a lengthy debate and special conference in 1991 confirmed overwhelmingly the position of the CWI in the England and Wales section, Grant and his supporters sought official faction status within the organisation, which was granted for some time, but later was revoked by the leadership. Ted Grant and his supporters lost a decisive vote and left to found the International Marxist Tendency which remained a part of the Labour Party until their expulsion under Keir Starmer’s leadership in 2024(now the Revolutionary Communist International).

Since their Open Turn CWI sections have, in a number of countries, stood candidates under their own name. One section has representation in a state parliament, the Socialist Party, which at its height had three TDs in Dáil Éireann in the Republic of Ireland. The CWI also has elected members in a number of regional legislatures or local councils in Sweden; (Germany) (members of The Left); Pakistan; Sri Lanka; and the United States, where Socialist Alternative elected Kshama Sawant to Seattle City Council in 2013 and again in 2015. In the 2005 Sri Lankan presidential elections the CWI affiliate, the United Socialist Party, came third (with 0.4%).

Supporters of the CWI launched a youth organisation, International Socialist Resistance, in 2001.

=== New mass workers' parties ===
CWI members stood as National Conscience Party candidates in the 2003 Nigerian legislative elections, winning 0.51% of the national vote. In Germany CWI members have been active in the new WASG since its foundation in 2004 and in December 2005 were elected part of the new leadership of its Berlin district that ran candidates on a clear anti-cuts programme in the 2006 Berlin regional election, gaining 3.1% and several borough council seats, but the Berlin WASG later merged into Die Linke. In Brazil, CWI members helped found the P-SOL Socialism and Liberty Party after left wing parliamentarians were expelled from the PT.

In the 2011 Irish general election the CWI's Irish affiliate, the Socialist Party won two seats in the Dáil as a part of the wider left group, the United Left Alliance which won five seats in total in Dáil Éireann. However, one of the elected members of the Socialist Party later left the party to continue as an independent. In the by-election in Dublin West in 2014, the Socialist Party gained a second seat in the Dáil again, and a third seat in the 2014 Dublin South-West by-election as part of the Anti-Austerity Alliance.

Between 2011–2016, the CWI lost sections in Argentina, Bolivia, Portugal, and five others while gaining sections in South Africa and Tunisia.

By 2017, the CWI had sections in 30 countries, 14 of which were in Europe The membership in 2013 had the total membership at c.6,000 but the Socialist Party of England and Wales made up 2,300 of that as its biggest section with its second biggest being the Indian section with 500 members.

== Dissolution ==
In 2018 and 2019, a dispute within the Committee for a Workers' International developed around the questions of socialism and identity politics.

One faction founded the In Defence of a Working Class and Trotskyist CWI (IDWCTCWI) faction, which considers itself a continuation of the original CWI, using the same name. Several groups subsequently split away from the IDWCTCWI to form International Revolutionary Left.

A second faction, in support of the majority of the CWI's International Executive Committee, later renamed itself International Socialist Alternative and also considers itself the continuation of the original CWI.

== Structure ==
World Congress
Deliberative organ

International Executive Committee
Executive organ

International Secretariat
Administrative organ

- Held every 3 to 5 years;
- Attended by delegates from the CWI's national sections;
- Responsible for establishing the international's programme and policies;
- Grants recognition of new sympathising sections;
- Elects the International Executive Committee.
- Composed of members from across the CWI elected at the world congress;
- Responsible for the CWI's policies in between congresses;
- Elects the International Secretariat.
- Conducts the day-to-day work of the CWI;
- Responsible for carrying out the directives of the IEC, to which it is accountable;
- Prepares documents and reports for review and approval at IEC meetings.

== Sections at the time of the split ==
Around the time of the split, the international maintained a list of numerous claimed national sections as part of the organisation. Notable national sections from this time include:

Section	Name	English Translation
Australia	Socialist Party	
England and Wales	Socialist Party	
Hong Kong	社會主義行動 Sekuizyuji Haangdung	Socialist Action
India	New Socialist Alternative	
(Republic of Ireland) (Northern Ireland) Ireland	Socialist Party / Páirtí Sóisialach	
Nigeria	Democratic Socialist Movement	
South Africa	Workers and Socialist Party	
Spain	Izquierda Revolucionaria	Revolutionary Left
Sri Lanka	එක්සත් සමාජවාදි පකෂය / ஐக்கிய சோசலிச கட்சி Eksath Samajavadi Pakshaya / Aikkiy Cōcalic Kaṭci	United Socialist Party
United States	Socialist Alternative	

== Youth against Racism in Europe ==
Logo of Youth against Racism in Europe

Youth against Racism in Europe (YRE) was an anti-racist organisation founded by the Committee for a Workers' International (the international network of the Militant tendency) it campaigned among young people in 16 countries in Europe. YRE was launched by an international demonstration of a claimed 40,000 people, in Brussels in October 1992.

In the UK, YRE was launched in 1992, at a time of rising racist violence and electoral support for the far right. YRE was formed by Militant Labour as an alternative to the rival Socialist Workers Party (UK)'s Anti-Nazi League (ANL), relaunched the previous year, and the Anti-Racist Alliance.

In 2010 it was revealed that the group been infiltrated by an undercover police officer working for the Metropolitan Police.

In 2012, it called for the shutting down of the Golden Dawn organisation and its weekly newspaper on the grounds that "they propagate violent messages of hate".

== See also ==
- List of Trotskyist internationals
- Revolutionary socialism
