= Revolutionary Communist International =

Trotskyist political international

- Abbreviation: RCI
- Governing body: Central Committee
- Founder: Ted Grant
- Founded: Committee for a Marxist International (1992); International Marxist Tendency (2004); Revolutionary Communist International (June 2024)
- Split from: Committee for a Workers' International
- Headquarters: London, United Kingdom
- Membership: c.7,100 (2025)
- Ideology: Communism; Leninism; Trotskyism; Anti-Stalinism
- Political position: Far-left
- Colors: Red
- Slogan: “Forward to the building of a new International!”
- Anthem: The Internationale

Website
- www.marxist.com

The Revolutionary Communist International (RCI) is a Trotskyist political international. Founded as the Committee for a Marxist International (CMI) by political theorist Ted Grant and his supporters after a split from the Committee for a Workers' International in 1992, the group renamed itself the International Marxist Tendency (IMT) in 2004, before becoming the RCI in 2024. The organisation has a number of sections internationally and is the largest of the Trotskyist Internationals with a total membership of over 7,100 among sections and groups in around 40 countries as of August 2025.

The organization is centered on proletarian internationalism, anti-imperialism, permanent revolution, and the belief that capitalism cannot be replaced through parliamentary reform alone. It argues that workers must build independent revolutionary organizations, rejects popular front alliances that dilute working-class independence, and links struggles against war, austerity, environmental destruction, and oppression to the struggle against capitalism. Although the RCI may participate in elections and support progressive reforms, the organization views these mainly as tools for organizing rather than as a path to socialism, while rejecting liberal identity politics and postmodernism in favor of class-based unity and Marxist understanding of social questions.

Particular demands that the organisation advocates for include the elimination of hunger and homelessness, guaranteed employment, a shorter working week without loss of pay, universal healthcare and education, affordable housing and free public transport.

The organisation's website (marxist.com) is multilingual and publishes international current affairs articles, as well as historical and theoretical articles in its quarterly journal In Defence of Marxism.

== Background ==
Ted Grant founded what would become the Revolutionary Communist International.

Militant tendency was an entryist group within the British Labour Party based around the Militant newspaper that was founded in 1964. In 1974, Militant and its allies in Sweden, Ireland, and other countries formed the Committee for a Workers' International. The organisation gained more members during the 1970s and early 1980s and dominated the Liverpool City Council. In 1983, the five members of the Militant newspaper's editorial board were expelled for contravening the Labour Party constitution and expulsions of Militant members continued throughout the rest of the decade. Ted Grant was a longtime leader of Militant until it split in early 1992 over a number of issues and he was expelled. In 1992, Grant and his supporters formed the Socialist Appeal (SA) in Britain. The SA was expelled from the Labour Party in 2021 as part of a wider purge of left wing groups who had supported the previous Labour leader Jeremy Corbyn, with any Labour member being found to be a member of Socialist Appeal could be automatically removed.

The Committee for a Marxist International was founded in 1992 in Tarragona. The group split from the CWI after the majority of the international rejected entryism and social democracy, leaving a group led by Ted Grant and Alan Woods in the minority. Ted Grant's reputation helped build the organisation, and he served as its leader from 1992 until 2006.

At its World Congress in 2004, the organisation was renamed the International Marxist Tendency (IMT).

In late 2009, a dispute developed between the IMT leadership and the leaderships of its sections in Spain (El Militante), Venezuela (Corriente Marxista Revolucionaria) and Mexico (Partido Comunista Revolucionario). In January 2010, these organisations, together with the group in Colombia and the Mexican section, broke with the IMT and established a new international body, the Izquierda Revolucionaria (Revolutionary Left). Minorities in Venezuela and Spain chose to remain with the IMT and set up new sections.

The new IMT Venezuelan section launched their newspaper, Lucha de Clases, in 2010. In the same year, another smaller split occurred. The majority of the Swedish section, factions in Poland and Britain and individuals from several other sections left the IMT to form a new group called Towards a New International Tendency. The Iranian section of the IMT also split away over the international's position on Venezuela's friendly relations with the Iranian government and in 2011 launched Marxist Revival.

In 2012, Nobel laureate Malala Yousafzai spoke at a Marxist educational event in Pakistan, organised by the IMT. Over the 2010s the IMT became less entryist and more left wing and ceased working with Young Labour in the UK.

In 2022, the IMT had 32 affiliated groups, but that many of them had less than 400 members, the membership at the time of Socialist Appeal.

Between 2023 and 2024, the organisation reorganized itself as the Revolutionary Communist International, branding itself as "Revolutionary Communist Party" in its respective national sections. The renaming was spurred in part by a 2023 Fraser institute poll, which found that 29% of Brits under 34 preferred communism to capitalism. The RCI's founding conference was held in Italy in June 2024.

In July 2024, two former members of the Swedish section of the international, Revolutionära kommunistiska partiet (RKP), made various allegations in the newspaper ETC, including that they had been sexually abused by a member of the party's executive committee. The former members also accused the party of encouraging them to "give away their savings, distance themselves from their families, drop out of education and engage in sexual relationships with older party comrades." The Swedish publication, Magasinet Konkret noted that the alleged abuser was asked to resign, while the party denied the other claims. Magasinet Konkret also disagreed with some of the characterisations made in the ETC report, such as the RKP having internal disciplinary processes being unusual for a political organisation, as well as noting the lack of substantiation of some of the more serious allegations. When asked for a comment, the RKP stated they have "zero-tolerance to violence and harassment in the party", that their investigation had been inconclusive but the alleged abuser had already resigned beforehand after being asked to do so because they "did not show the responsibility that one would expect from a leading comrade".

In July 2024, hundreds of members marched in Philadelphia, prompting Elon Musk to respond to a video of the demonstration that was captioned with "Billionaires are parasites."

== National sections ==
The organisation has a number of sections internationally and is the largest of the Trotskyist Fourth Internationals Its founding conference in 2024 was attended by people from 120 different countries.

Some of the countries that have or had national sections include: Argentina, Australia, Austria, Belgium, Bolivia, Catalonia, El Salvador, Finland, France, Germany, India, Indonesia, Ireland, Mexico, Netherlands, New Zealand, Norway, Pakistan, Peru, Poland, Portugal, Puerto Rico, Russia, Serbia, South Africa, Spain, Sweden, Switzerland, and Venezuela.

The organization maintains a list of all its currently claimed national sections on its website.

Sections with their own articles are in the table below:

Country	Name	Notes	Ref
Brazil	Esquerda Marxista		
Canada: Québec	Revolutionary Communist Party (Canada): Parti communiste révolutionnaire (Canada)		
Denmark	Revolutionært Kommunistisk Parti	Refounded in October 2024	
Flanders	Vonk		
Great Britain	Revolutionary Communist Party (UK, 2024)	Publishes the The Communist (UK, 2024)	
Greece	Επαναστατική Κομμουνιστική Οργάνωση	Born in 2004 as a Splinter group from Socialist Expression. Refounded in 2024.	
Italy	Partito Comunista Rivoluzionario		
Sweden	Revolutionära kommunistiska partiet	Established in 2024 around the Revolution (Swedish newspaper) created in 2010	
Taiwan	Revolutionary Communist Party (Taiwan)		
USA	Revolutionary Communists of America	Established in 2002, known as Socialist Revolution until February 2024.	
Yugoslavia	Marksistička organizacija Crveni		

== Ideology ==
The organisation supports proletarian internationalism, anti-imperialism, permanent revolution and rejects the possibility of parliamentary paths to socialism, urging workers to build independent democratic revolutionary cadres capable of overthrowing capitalism.

In its manifesto, the RCI argues that the main causes of economic crises are "private ownership of the means of production" and the "suffocating straitjacket of the national state." The organization also characterizes liberal democracy as "merely a smiling mask" concealing "the dictatorship of the banks and big corporations," arguing that beneath the principle of "one citizen, one vote," capitalism effectively operates according to "one dollar, one vote."

The organisation treats opposition to imperialism, war, austerity, inflation, and environmental destruction as components of the struggle against capitalism. According to Johan Uhrskov, a leading member, "we are not merely climate activists or pro-Palestinian demonstrators...We unite these struggles into a single struggle based on a Marxist perspective.” While declaring opposition to discrimination and oppression, the organization rejects identity politics and postmodernism in favor of working-class unity and class struggle.

The RCI considers the Russo-Ukrainian war to be a proxy war that is "reactionary...on both sides." Johan Uhrskov a leading member, asserts: "[w]e're on the side of the Ukrainian workers. And on the side of the Russian workers. We aren't on the side of the regimes."

The organization supported the Bolivarian revolution and from 2004 onward, the leadership of the RCI (then IMT), especially Alan Woods, was in personal contact with Venezuelan President Hugo Chávez and urged him to take more radical measures such as expropriating the banks and capitalists and replacing the state bureaucracy with organs of worker's power, stating that otherwise it would act as a counter-revolutionary force.

Although the organisation generally rejects parliamentarism, it uses elections to publicize its ideas, recruit members and assist the construction of movements outside parliament. Max Klein, an editor of The Red Flag, a periodical of the organization, states that “we can and must support any struggle for genuinely progressive reforms that will improve the lives of workers in any way," while maintaining that such "little tweaks around the edges" cannot fundamentally resolve the issues of capitalism. The view that reformism is "no longer viable", and the view that the future involves only "socialism or barbarism" is criticized by John Kelly — an industrial-relations scholar and a former CPGB member — for being "conceptually naive and empirically flawed."

Particular demands that the organisation advocates for include the elimination of hunger and homelessness, guaranteed employment, a shorter working week without loss of pay, universal healthcare and education, affordable housing, free public transport, and a planned economy. The organisation states that the emancipation of the working class can only be achieved by the establishment of "socialist planning under democratic workers’ control and management," replacing production for profit with a rationally planned, international society intended to satisfy human needs.

The organisation states that it does not support nominally communist totalitarian regimes, including that of Joseph Stalin and Mao Zedong, characterizing them as deformed workers' states. Leading theorist of the party, Alan Woods, states that "the democratic workers’ state established by Lenin and Trotsky in 1917 had absolutely nothing in common with the bureaucratic-totalitarian monstrosity presided over by Stalin and his successors."

== Organisation ==
The organisation claims to be different from other groups by giving members rigorous academic training in theory and organising, and attempting widespread recruitment of members that will be dedicated. The organisation participates in protests with other organizations, but opposes popular fronts, viewing broad alliances with moderate or right-leaning groups as compromises that weaken revolutionary independence.

Members are expected to study Marxist theory and the history of revolutions and to demonstrate practical commitment by attending picket lines, writing for the party newspaper, organising campus demonstrations or unionising workplaces. A journalist, Alexander Hinsby, described his visit to a meeting of the organisation as surprisingly welcoming and intellectually rigorous, saying that "everyone, even as an infidel outsider, was allowed to express their opinions" and that he had never encountered members so "well-trained in argumentation, articulate or theoretically well-prepared."
