= Entryism =

Strategy of joining an organization to politically influence it

Entryism (also called entrism, enterism, infiltration, a French Turn, boring from within, or boring-from-within) is a political strategy in which an organization or state encourages its members or supporters to join another, usually larger, organization in an attempt to expand influence and expand their ideas and program. If the organization being "entered" is hostile to entryism, the entryists may engage in a degree of subterfuge and subversion to hide the fact that they are an organization in their own right.

== Socialist entryism ==
=== "Boring from within" ===
One entryist strategy that took place in the United States is called the "boring from within" strategy. Radical workers would join established (and often conservative) trade unions and attempt to join their leadership to shift their stances leftward. These workers were called "borers". Boring was opposed by radical workers who supported dual unionism, where radical unions would attempt to win over workers and company-level union locals from the established trade unions.

Starting in the 1890s, a faction of the Socialist Labor Party – which would split to become the Socialist Party of America – began "boring from within" in an attempt to make the American Federation of Labor (AFL) more radical. In contrast, the Industrial Workers of the World – and another faction of the Socialist Labor Party, close to the Socialist Trade and Labor Alliance, which would remain in the party – supported a dual unionist strategy of competing against the AFL within a workplace.

In opposition, Daniel De Leon of the Socialist Labor Party criticized "boring from within only" and supported "boring from within and without". SLP members were encouraged to join the Socialist Trade and Labor Alliance and later the Workers' International Industrial Union.

In 1929, the Communist Party of America abandoned "boring from within" the AFL and embraced dual unionism against the AFL. As a result, its labor organization, the Trade Union Educational League (TUEL) became the Trade Union Unity League (TUUL).

=== Trotsky's "French Turn" ===
The "French Turn" refers to the classic form of entryism advocated by Leon Trotsky in his essays on "The French Turn". In June 1934, he proposed that the French Trotskyists dissolve their Communist League and join the French Section of the Workers' International (SFIO), and that the Communist League dissolve its youth section in order to join more easily with revolutionary elements. The tactic was adopted in August 1934, despite some opposition, and successfully raised the group's membership to 300 activists.

Proponents of the tactic advocated that the Trotskyists should enter the social democratic parties in order to connect with revolutionary socialist currents within them, and then steer those currents toward Leninism. However, entryism lasted briefly since the leadership of the SFIO started to expel the Trotskyists. The Trotskyists of the Workers Party of the United States also successfully used their entry into the Socialist Party of America to recruit their youth group and other members. Similar tactics were also used by Trotskyist organisations in other countries, including the Netherlands, Belgium, Switzerland, and Poland. Entryism was used to connect with and recruit leftward-moving political currents inside radical parties.

Since it was used in France, Marxists have used the tactic even if they had different preconceptions of how long the period of entry would last:

- A "split perspective" is sometimes employed in which the smaller party intends to remain in the larger party for a short period of time, with the intention of splitting the organisation and leaving with more members than it began with.
- The entryist tactic can work successfully, in its own terms, over a long period. For example, it was attempted by the Militant tendency in the United Kingdom, whose members worked within the Labour Party from the 1950s onward and managed to get control in the Labour Party Young Socialists and Liverpool City Council before they were expelled in the 1980s. Many other Trotskyist groups have attempted similar feats, but few have gained the influence that the Militant tendency attained.

=== "Entryism sui generis" or "deep entryism" ===
After the end of World War II, Michel Pablo – then in the Leadership of the Fourth International – proposed a tactic of long-term entry into the "mass-parties of the working class", primarily because the meagre prospects of building independent parties in the post-war circumstances. This would primarily prevent the tiny propaganda-circles of the Trotskyist movement becoming sectarian circles, isolated from the working class.

The organizations were understood to retain their political identity and their own press.

The sui generis ("of a special type") variant did contain the difference that, where their own political identity could not be maintained, the group would maintain an independent presence, which would primarily aid the task of entry.

In Europe, that was the approach used, for example, by The Club and later Socialist Action in the British Labour Party, and by Fourth Internationalists inside the Communist Parties. In France, Trotskyist organizations, most notably the Parti des Travailleurs and its predecessors, have successfully entered trade unions and mainstream left-wing parties.

=== Open entryism ===
Some political parties, such as the Workers' Party in Brazil or the Scottish Socialist Party, allow political tendencies to organise within them openly. In those cases, the term "entryism" is not usually used. Political groups that work within a larger organisation but also maintain a "public face" often reject the term "entryism" but are sometimes still considered to be entryists by the larger organization.

== Examples by country ==
=== Australia ===
In Australia, the practice was widespread during the 1950s, when the Communist Party of Australia battled against right-wing Industrial Groups for control of Australian trade unions. The 'Groupers' subsequently formed the Democratic Labor Party. Today, the practice in Australia is often known as a type of branch stacking.

In 1985, the Nuclear Disarmament Party was split after accusations that it had been infiltrated by the Socialist Workers Party (SWP), a Trotskyist group.

In recent times, RSPCA Australia has been described as being the victims of the practice. The National Farmers' Federation and Animals Australia have each been accused of infiltrating branches of RSPCA Australia in an attempt to promote opposing policies concerning battery hens, intensive pig farming, and the live export of sheep.

Since the 2000s, the religious right has practiced entryism into a number of state branches of the Liberal Party of Australia, notably in New South Wales, Western Australia, Queensland and Victoria. During the 2022 Victorian state election, one upper house candidate, Renee Heath, was accused of being a part of an entryist plot begun by the Pentecostal church begun by her father, by Catherine Burnett-Wake, whom Heath had defeated for pre-selection. Heath would later have her position in the Liberal Party ended by Matthew Guy, although the move came too late for her to be disendorsed from her near-certain victory as the first ranked candidate in her upper house zone, and she was eventually allowed to return to the party after the election and Guy's removal as leader.

In 2018, it was revealed that the NSW National party and its youth wing, the Young Nationals, had been infiltrated by the far right, with more than 30 members being investigated for alleged links. Leader McCormack denounced the infiltration, and several suspected far rightists were expelled from the party and its youth wing.

=== China ===
During the Northern Expedition in China, the Chinese Communist Party (CCP) joined the party of the Nationalist Party of China (Kuomintang) for a time (1923–1927), creating the First United Front, but one of the CCP's ideas behind doing so was the possibility of eventually gaining a majority in the Nationalist Party and shaping its policies. Eventually, the situation degraded, the Nationalists expelled the Communists from their party, and the Chinese Civil War began. The war was paused for a time (1936–1945) to allow for a Second United Front during the Second Sino-Japanese War. However, the civil war resumed again and remained active until 1950, after the CCP had won.

=== Germany ===
In 1967 West German student movement leader Rudi Dutschke coined the slogan "long march through the institutions" as a way to bring about fundamental change in West German society. The idea of a "long march through the institutions" became associated with the West German New Left's efforts to bring about social change from within existing institutions. Dustchke and others argued that activists could influence society by entering fields such as education, the media and politics, while also building new forms of political and social organization. The idea became an important part of the discussions regarding the role of the student movement and the New Left in West Germany during the late 1960s and 1970s.As a conservative, government-supporting kind of entryism, the GDR branch of the Communist Party of Germany/Marxists–Leninists was infiltrated by the Stasi. In some of the cells there were more IMs than real members.

=== New Zealand ===
The country's four small communist parties, the Communist Party of New Zealand (CPNZ), Socialist Unity Party (SUP), Workers Communist League (WCL), and the Socialist Action League (SAL), have tried to influence the Labour Party, the trade unions, and various popular issues, like the anti-Springbok tour protests, Māori biculturalism, and the anti-nuclear movement. During the ANZUS diplomatic crisis 1984 to 1985, which resulted from New Zealand's nuclear ship ban, the pro-Moscow SUP tried to infiltrate anti-nuclear organisations, as part of a strategy of steering New Zealand's foreign policy away from its traditional ally, the United States.

New Zealand's Christian Right also attempted to obtain electoral influence. During the 1987 general election, several conservative Christian groups, including the Society for the Protection of Unborn Children (SPUC), Women for Life and the Coalition of Concerned Citizens, tried to infiltrate the National Party by running conservative Christian individuals as candidates. The groups also attacked the Labour government's policies towards peace education, sex education, abortion, Māori biculturalism, and the ANZUS alliance. Several CCC supporters contested the 1987 election as National candidates, including Rob Wheeler (Mount Albert), Andrew Stanley (Onehunga), and Howard Martin (Papatoetoe). However, the efforts met little electoral success, and the Lange government was re-elected for a second term.

During the 1990s, another conservative tendency emerged within the National Party by the establishment of the informal Christian Voice in 1998. However, the group had faded by the mid-2000s, when several minor Christian political parties including former National MP Graeme Lee's Christian Democrat Party, Peter Dunne's United Future, and Brian Tamaki's Destiny New Zealand emerged to court the evangelical Christian vote. As a result of the attempts at taking over the party, National quietly centralised its candidate selection procedures.

Despite the tensions with moral conservatives, National Party leader Don Brash still accepted covert assistance from the Exclusive Brethren during the 2005 general elections. The assistance included organizing a separate electoral canvassing and advertising campaign that attacked the incumbent Labour and Green coalition government. The strategy backfired and contributed to Prime Minister Helen Clark's second re-election. The controversy arising from the Exclusive Brethren's canvassing on behalf of National, Brash's successor, Prime Minister John Key, explicitly rejected any assistance from the Exclusive Brethren during the 2008 election.

=== Portugal ===
After the downfall of the centrist-to-centre-left Democratic Renewal Party in the 1990s, it was taken over by far-right elements that, soon afterward, transformed the party into the National Renovator Party.

=== United Kingdom ===
A long-lasting entry tactic was used by the Trotskyist group Militant tendency, whose initially small numbers of supporters worked within the mainstream Labour Party from the 1960s. By the early 1980s they still numbered only in the low thousands, but had managed to gain a controlling influence of the Labour Party Young Socialists and Liverpool City Council; however, shortly thereafter Militant activists began to be expelled after an internal Labour ruling that their organisation breached the party's constitution. A remnant of the group operated within the Labour Party as Socialist Appeal (until their expulsion in 2021) but the majority then left to form the Socialist Party (England and Wales).

George Monbiot, a columnist for The Guardian, claims that a group, influenced by the defunct Marxist Living Marxism magazine, has pursued entryist tactics in British scientific and media organisations since the late 1990s.

The 2015 Labour Party leadership election was the target of a campaign by The Daily Telegraph for Conservative sympathisers to join the Labour party (at a fee of £3) in order to vote for the left-wing candidate Jeremy Corbyn, with the view that he would render the party unelectable. That strategy was labelled 'entryism' by observers, though it is unclear that it qualifies under the commonly-understood definition, unlike the broader term 'subversion'. Likewise, the left-wing Momentum group has been accused of entryism and engaging in the Militant-style tactics, with movements made by prominent Labour MPs (current and suspended) to deselect MPs who did not support Corbyn.

In the wake of the Brexit vote in 2016, some supporters of Leave feared that the government would negotiate a deal that would keep far too many ties between the UK and the European Union, so members of the United Kingdom Independence Party (UKIP), which had struggled politically since Brexit, joined the Conservative Party, along with previously independent Leave supporters. The movement was especially pronounced in the constituencies of Conservative MPs who had supported Remain. The group Leave.EU ran campaigns that urged its supporters to join the Conservatives to deselect MPs who did not support a hard Brexit. Those who joined the party during that period were credited with helping Boris Johnson win the 2019 leadership election (and thus become Prime Minister) after Prime Minister Theresa May's resignation.

=== United States ===
Supporters of Fred Newman and the New Alliance Party joined the Reform Party en masse and gained some level of control over the New York State affiliate of the Reform Party. Another United States politician, Lyndon LaRouche, had attempted an entryist strategy in the Democratic Party since 1980, but with little success. Democratic Socialist Organizing Committee was noted for its "realignment" strategy efforts within the Democratic Party in the 1970s, while its modern-day successor Democratic Socialists of America is primarily focused on running its members on the Democratic Party platform (e.g. Alexandria Ocasio-Cortez and Rashida Tlaib), or endorsing other democratic socialists at doing so (e.g. Bernie Sanders). Many Libertarian Party or right-libertarian-leaning politicians have run for office as Republicans, and several (such as Ron Paul, his son Rand Paul, Mark Sanford, Justin Amash, Thomas Massie, and Gary Johnson) have been successful, although some of them have subsequently left the Republican Party.

== Alleged religious entryism ==
In 2025, a report authored by two senior civil servants in the French government and presented to President Emmanuel Macron, claimed that the Islamist group the Muslim Brotherhood was engaged in a policy of political entryism for the purpose of "infiltrating" the country's republican institutions, and posed a threat to "national cohesion". The report accused the Federation of Muslims of France (FMF) as being the Brotherhood's "main actor" in France. In response to the report, Macron asked his government for proposals "to tackle the Islamist threat". Gabriel Attal, leader of the Renaissance party, suggested banning children under 15 from wearing the hijab in public spaces.

The FMF denied these accusations and said "confusing Islam with political Islamism and radicality is not only dangerous, but counter-productive for the Republic itself. Behind these unfounded accusations there is a plan to stigmatise Islam and Muslims." The French Council of the Muslim Faith said that the report risks "fuelling fantasies and conspiracy theories, the consequences of which are unfortunately very real". Professor Mohammed Hafez of the Department of National Security Affairs at the Naval Postgraduate School in California said "To put it bluntly, I think talk of a Muslim Brotherhood threat to Europe is at best exaggerated and at worst is Islamophobia." Franck Frégosi, a political scientist whose work was cited in the report, "voiced fears that the French government’s aim, rather than responding to real security threats, is to offer political cover to limit the participation of French Muslims in public life and casts suspicion over all Muslims engaged in political activity."

French political sociologist Amel Boubekeur argued that the purpose of the report was to reframe the political engagement of those opposed to the war in Gaza and to France's alignment with Israel, particularly among young Muslim voters, as a threat to national security in order to legitimize the government's repression of pro-Palestinian expression.

== Laws against entryism ==
Some jurisdictions have passed laws to discourage entryism. In New York State elections, changes in party affiliation by voters already registered are not formally processed until a week after that year's general election to prevent entryism in a primary election since they are open only to voters who are already enrolled in the party holding the primary. The state's Wilson Pakula law, passed after American Labor Party candidates were entering and winning Democratic and Republican Party primaries in the late 1940s, also requires candidates who are not members of a particular political party to get formal permission from the relevant jurisdiction's party committees before they run in a primary election.

== See also ==
- Agent of influence
- Communist front
- Fifth Column
- Ghost skin
- Incrementalism
- Long march through the institutions
- Passive revolution
- Reformism
- Salami tactics
- Spoils system
- State capture
