= Jobs for a Change =

1980s festivals in London, England

The Jobs for a Change festivals were two music festivals that took place in London, England, in the mid-1980s, against a background of high unemployment, a year-long miners' strike, and Margaret Thatcher's development plans for the abolition of the Greater London Council (GLC). These events were free and attracted a huge audience. The first, on the South Bank in June 1984, drew about 150,000 people. The second, in Battersea Park the following July, attracted an estimated 250,000. The musicians included The Smiths, Billy Bragg, Hank Wangford, Aswad, The Redskins and The Pogues. There were also theatrical groups, cabaret, films and exhibitions, talks, debates and stalls set up by external organisations.

The Greater London Council, the city's local authority from 1965 to 1986, ran two major popular-music festivals to highlight what it was doing to fight unemployment under Margaret Thatcher's government, boost the London economy and help create and fund new jobs. It also ran several concerts for the unemployed – at various town halls across London, at a big top set up in Finsbury Park for a Christmas Party and at the Royal Albert Hall for an evening of jazz and African music.

The person mainly responsible for setting up and producing the events was Tony Hollingsworth, who later produced two concerts for Nelson Mandela: the first calling for his release from prison in apartheid South Africa, and the second celebrating it.

== Jobs for a Change Festival, 10 June 1984 ==
The first Jobs for a Change festival – named after the title of a GLC newspaper – was devised because the GLC's Industry and Employment committee was worried that its initiatives to combat unemployment and help create and fund jobs were not getting across to a wider public. A day-long festival, it was thought, would provide a platform to show the public what the GLC was doing to combat unemployment and that there were ways for local government and, by implication, national government to help create jobs. At the same time, the GLC would be meeting its brief to put on cultural events for part of its diverse population.

The festival was not aimed at fighting abolition: that issue was being fought elsewhere in the GLC. The authority had also put on several smaller concerts in its parks. Most important, it believed in formulating cultural policies, of which popular music was an important part, as a means of popularising "leftist sentiments". In this context, the first Jobs for a Change festival was a notable event. But Hollingsworth insisted that, although some of the music would be political, the music stages should not be used for political debate or anti-Thatcher slogans. To be effective, campaigning must be in the positive and must show what the GLC was doing about unemployment – rather than attack Thatcher.

The GLC had intended to organise the jobs festival itself but it became obvious in late 1983 that the officers of the industry and employment branch could not produce a large festival on top of their normal jobs. So, late in the day, it brought in four consultants to do the job: Ken Hulme, Sue Beardon, David Bradford and Hollingsworth.

Hulme had run trade-union campaign activities, was experienced at managing people and was to become, in effect, site manager; Beardon and Bradford had been involved in left-wing theatre and Hollingsworth had helped run the Glastonbury CND festivals for the previous three years. His time at Glastonbury, as manager to director Michael Eavis, had given him a broad hands-on experience of most facets of producing large-scale concerts and festivals and it led naturally to him becoming the key organiser and producer of the Jobs festival.

The event took place over 12 hours on a Sunday on a long stretch of the South Bank, taking in County Hall, the Royal Festival Hall, the Queen Elizabeth Hall, the National Film Theatre, the National Theatre, the GLC car park and Jubilee Gardens.

The music was presented from two stages. There were also theatrical groups, films and talks on film by, among others, director Ken Loach, and interviews with the actors from Alan Bleasdale's tough black comedy Boys from the Blackstuff. There were also a large number of stalls staffed by community groups and other external organisations; an exhibition of the GLC's work; speeches and a five-hour rolling debate about jobs and employment in the council chamber of County Hall.

The atmosphere of County Hall must have been a shock for those who knew the place. Throughout the day, it "swarmed with young punks, skinheads, Rastafarians and a host of other Londoners. They camped on the grand staircase (in the past reserved for VIPs only) and in the wood-panelled corridors of the Principal Floor". At one point during the rolling debate, the council chamber was given over to speeches by miners' wives, including Anne Scargill, wife of miners' leader Arthur Scargill.

The festival's music was provided by a huge array of artists that included The Smiths, Billy Bragg, Hank Wangford, The Redskins, Aswad, Mari Wilson, Misty in Roots and Ivor Cutler. They were chosen because they were known to be supportive of the cause, either through their songs or in comments to the press, or because they were simply willing to appear under the Jobs for a Change banner. A few wrote political music. With the aim of creating a culturally diverse mix, Hollingsworth brought in black artists from the US and Africa, including the American poet, singer and writer Gil Scott-Heron and several who had never appeared in London before.

One of the bands was the socialist a cappella group, The Flying Pickets, whose debut single "Only You" was the 1983 Christmas No.1 and, oddly enough, Margaret Thatcher's favourite record. A few weeks earlier, Hollingsworth got the band to write a song called Give us Jobs, Jobs, Jobs for a Change, sung like a barber-shop quartet and with the speaking voice of GLC leader Ken Livingstone. A vinyl disc of the piece was distributed inside Time Out magazine the week before to promote the festival.

The Smiths, who had been booked as the main event before they had had a hit, were due to be introduced by Livingstone and, according to Hollingsworth, "he asked me just before he went what he should say. I told him: 'Flatter the audience and then say 'The Smiths'. He went on stage and said 'Ladies and Gentlemen, I have walked through this car park every day for the last five years and it's never looked as good as it does now. 'The Smiths'. The whole crowd, perhaps 50,000 people, some climbing up the walls, erupted. In terms of using entertainment and culture to create an atmosphere under a title of Jobs for a Change, it was a perfect end-point."

Livingstone's memory was that he spoke for rather longer, though far shorter than normal: "I was expected to go on [stage] and make one of my fascinating political speeches just before the Smiths were due to perform, by which time the gathered crowds had been waiting for hours for them to appear. It was at this point that I learnt the importance of keeping the politics brief when you're standing in front of a huge festival audience that, however politically sympathetic, really isn't there for the rhetoric. I risked five quick minutes of viciously denouncing Margaret Thatcher before introducing the band to plenty of applause. Any more and it might have been a different story…"

The day was mostly trouble-free, with one notable exception. The Redskins were on stage when a large number of National Front supporters arrived after being turned away by the police from a march on Trafalgar Square. The Redskins, who were known for their far-left politics, were an ideal target. A fight broke out in the crowd and several NF skinheads stormed the stage, injuring one of the guitarists who was taken to hospital accompanied by the compere, Hank Wangford. The NF supporters were chased off by the festival security people – Yorkshire miners who were on strike and had been employed by Hollingsworth as a way of providing support for the miners' strike fund. Their employment was unusual because the GLC and its unions usually insisted that jobs be done within the GLC.

== Jobs for a Change Festival, 7 July 1985 ==
The GLC considered the 1984 Jobs for a Change festival a big success and decided to stage another the following July in Battersea Park, south-west London. The event was organised on a bigger scale, attracting 250,000 people (a more likely number than the 500,000 claimed by the London Evening Standard). It was part of what the GLC had designated as Jobs Year, as 1984 had been Anti-Racist Year and 1983 had been Peace Year.

Five stages were set up in the park for about 30 music acts. There were also two theatre tents in which six theatrical groups performed – other actors performed as they roamed the park and a poetry and cabaret tent for 16 acts, including a group of miners' wives reading their own poetry. There were also an art exhibition of miners' work, a sports area and a children's area which offered pony rides, theatre, story-telling, face-painting and a fairground. There were about 250 or so stalls run by community and other groups.

The musicians included Billy Bragg, Hank Wangford, Aswad, The Blues Band, The Pogues, The Opposition, The Communards and Frank Chickens. The five stages had different music policies. The acts on the main stage were representative of the festival's cast list and included Ravi Shankar from India, Thomas Mapfumo from Africa, Aswad from Britain, the pop group OMD (Orchestral Manoeuvres in the Dark) and the more political Billy Bragg.

The second stage was for the "up-and-coming, raunchy end of the pop market", which took in The Pogues who, according to one website, were so popular that "people were literally hanging out of trees to catch the act that was bringing the house down". A third was ear-marked for African and Latin music and a fourth for DJs and rapping. Between them, the third and fourth stages attracted more than 10,000 people, many of whom stayed all day there. A fifth stage was titled "Cowboys for Jobs" and was for musicians to fool around on.

When the GLC came to book Battersea Park for the festival it found that a part of the site had already been booked by the Battersea and Wandsworth trades union council for an event of their own. The council said that it would give up its part of the site if its name were put on the GLC posters and if it were given the job of organising and running the beer tent, according to one of those involved in the talks, Steve Pryle. Hollingsworth said that the GLC was under no obligation to accept the demands and that he agreed to give the beer provision to the council only after the two sides had worked out a detailed plan.

The council provided the beer for an event in the run-up to the festival, then the festival itself. Later that year, it formed the Workers Beer Company, which was given further contracts by Hollingsworth for a GLC Christmas Party for the Unemployed (see below) and the Glastonbury CND festival in 1986 and 1987. It has run festival or concert bars ever since and ran bars in 2008 at Glastonbury, Reading, Leeds and Latitude as well as trade union events.

Steve Pryle is now chair of the trading company running the Workers Beer Company (as well as press officer of the GMB union). According to his brother Eamon, who is executive vice-chairman, the company "was set up to help raise money when we were dealing with a very hostile council, Wandsworth". It has also helped set up organisations such as Ethical Threads, a fair-trade company sourcing T-shirts; Left Field, which runs a marquee for political debate and music at Glastonbury; and Clause IV, set up by former miners to organise campaigns for trade unions and infrastructure for events.

== Politics in the image ==
Critics argue that the GLC was profligate with its money and that public money should not have been spent on such popular culture. However, the GLC saw as part of its brief the provision of culture and entertainment to all parts of the diverse London population, including young people, and it thought that most of those who went to the festival enjoyed the day. According to John Hoyland, co-editor of the GLC newspaper Jobs for a Change, "the festivals were a great success, both politically and as festivals. They showed very well what a local authority could do. A legitimate part of that is giving people a good time."

The Battersea festival cost the authority about £200,000, according to Dick Muskett, the GLC's co-ordinator for Jobs Year. According to Hollingsworth, that made the event "very cost-effective". With an attendance of 250,000, the subsidy was under £1 per head. By comparison, seats at Covent Garden were subsidised by taxpayers and the rates at £20 per person.

Major speeches from the music stages were banned on the grounds that they would be counter-productive, but there were brief speeches between some of the acts. According to Hoyland, many people thought that the politics of the festivals were contained as much in the general image that the festivals created as in any overt statements made from the stage or elsewhere. That image contained implicit statements, one of the most important of which was the image of cultural and political diversity. "It is likely that it had far more effect on changing people's political awareness than any of the information put over about the issue of jobs".
