= Socialist Organiser =

Weekly newspaper formerly circulated in the British Labour Party

Socialist Organiser was a weekly socialist newspaper circulated in the Labour Party. The newspaper was founded in 1979 by the Socialist Campaign for a Labour Victory, later renamed the Socialist Organiser Alliance.

The newspaper was originally a vehicle for united work between the International-Communist League (I-CL), the Workers' Socialist League (who merged with the ICL to become a new WSL), Workers Power and independent leftists, such as Ken Livingstone. Some independent Labour leftists split from the paper when it opposed the tactic of raising rates to offset cuts to local government services.

In the mid-1980s, the paper was sued by the Workers Revolutionary Party over claims they repeated that the WRP was partially funded by money from the Libyan and Iraqi governments, but the WRP abandoned the action.

The newspaper gradually became more identified with the new WSL. This process was completed when the ICL/WSL fusion broke, as Socialist Organiser re-evaluated many of its international policies and developed its own distinctive "third camp" position.

As Socialist Organiser lost ground as a broad vehicle of left unity in the Labour Party, Sean Matgamna's supporters from the former ICL began to work entirely through the Socialist Organiser Alliance.

Socialist Organiser was denied the right to register with the Labour Party in 1990, but this had little practical effect and it continued to be published until 1995, when the Alliance for Workers' Liberty and International Socialist Group supported the launch of a new newspaper, Action for Solidarity.
