= Socialist Labour Group =

The Socialist Labour Group was a Trotskyist group in Britain between 1979 and 1989.

== Overview ==
The SLG originated politically in the 1971 split in the International Committee of the Fourth International (ICFI), between Gerry Healy's British Socialist Labour League (SLL) and Pierre Lambert's French Internationalist Communist Organisation (OCI). Betty Hamilton, an SLL founder and a Trotskyist since the 1930s, had sided with Lambert in 1971 but remained isolated, although still formally an SLL member until 1974. John and Mary Archer, also Trotskyists since the 1930s, had split with the SLL in the mid-1960s, disagreeing with its pullout from the Labour Party after 1964, with the exception of a few secret 'deep entrists'. They continued to work as individuals in the Labour Party in North London but for ten years were not active in an organisation. They were contacted in 1975 by Robin Blick and Mark Jenkins, (now a playwright in Wales) both leading SLL members who had broken with Healy in the early 1970s and formed a discussion circle centred on a critique of Healy which tended to see the SLL's move to become the Workers' Revolutionary Party (WRP) as similar to the Stalinist Third Period.

Harry Vince (an artist) and Ken Stratford had broken with the SLL in the late 1960s, arguing it was becoming a sect increasingly separated from the working class. They had joined and been expelled from International Socialists and Workers' Fight, discussed with the Militant and Chartists and were active in the Labour Party, forming a small group called Socialist Action. Regis Faugier (now a linguist) was a French ex-SLL member in St Helens who had organised a group of supporters outside the SLL, including Jean Faugier (now a nursing academic and consultant) Vince, Stratford and the Faugiers were in touch with the OCI from 1972 and in contact with Betty Hamilton from 1973.

== Split ==
In late 1974 the two groupings, mainly based in London, the larger around Blick and Jenkins (perhaps 20 plus including associates in Reading and Swindon) and another around Vince, Stratford and Faugier (perhaps 12 plus including associates in St Helens) began planning publication of a journal called the Marxist Bulletin. As a result, they became known as the Bulletin Group, aligned with Lambert's Organising Committee for the Reconstruction of the Fourth International to which the Hamilton-Vince-Stratford group were already linked. A heterogeneous tendency, they attempted to act as an 'external' faction of the SLL, with the aim of winning over more SLL members.

The Marxist Bulletin, which commented on SLL-WRP (the Socialist Labour League had become the Workers Revolutionary Party) politics and activities and gave a voice to the ideas of the OCRFI, was successfully infiltrated into the SLL, angering Healy who accused the group of writing substantial sections of documents circulated internally by SLL trade union leader Alan Thornett, who had formed an opposition grouping within the SLL and was soon to leave and form the Workers Socialist League. Healy supporters physically threatened Bulletin Group members and a leading SLL member boasted publicly that houses had been burgled and infiltrators sent in. Thornett did have meetings with Blick and Jenkins from the Bulletin Group, who reached him via Kate Blakeney (a leading member of the WRP) in Reading and Ray Howells in Swindon. The initial document upon which the Thornett opposition was founded was in fact co-written by Bulletin Group members, essentially Robin Blick, in consultation with Mark Jenkins and John Archer, but this did not lead to an ongoing political relationship.

Lambert wanted Robin Blick to lead the Bulletin Group as open supporters of the OCRFI, with parallel entry work in the Labour Party, where the Vince-Stratford wing and the Archers already worked as entrists. The grouping around Blick and Jenkins were holding secret caucus meetings within the Bulletin Group and moving away from support for the OCI. Harry Vince left the Bulletin Group and moved to Ireland in 1975, where he joined the League for a Workers Republic. Mark Jenkins and then Robin Blick, along with most of their supporters, such as Tom Hillier, Nick Peck and Robin Brown, began to question Trotskyism-Leninism from about 1976 and left the Bulletin Group over a period. Robin and Karen Blick developed 'anti-Soviet' politics and were later founders of the Polish Solidarity Campaign.

Kate Blakeney moved to Australia and was active in the USec (United Secretariat of the Fourth International) affiliate there for a time. John and Mary Archer remained loyal to the OCRFI-Lambert, but hostile to Betty Hamilton and Ken Stratford. They regrouped some newer student members centred on Marcus Giaquinto and John Ford (now academics), who had never been members of the SLL-WRP, with other members in Reading, Swindon and Norwich and kept the name Bulletin Group. Some of them engaged in entrist work in the Labour Party. They continued with the publication of the Bulletin until 1977 but its influence on the SLL had fast diminished after the Thornett group split and it had many internal tensions. Betty Hamilton, Ken Stratford, Regis Faugier and their associates formed a separate British Committee for the Reconstruction of the Fourth International. The two small groupings were both affiliated to the Lambert OCRFI but had little relations with each other. In 1979 Vince moved back from Ireland at Lambert's request and the two groups joined to form a new grouping, which called itself the Socialist Labour Group (SLG). This was enlarged in 1981 by a merger with some supporters of Nahuel Moreno from the IMG, including Mike Phipps (now an editorial board member of Labour Left Briefing), and the SLG affiliated to the Parity Committee for the Reconstruction of the Fourth International when that was formed.

== Active in Labour Party ==
The Socialist Labour Group remained active in the Labour Party, student unions and trade unions until 1988, publishing Unite and Fight, Socialist Newsletter and later Fourth Internationalist. It was also active in the Troops Out Movement, Labour Committee on Ireland and the London H-Blocks Committee and took part in various international solidarity campaigns linked to the OCRFI, PCRFI and FI-ICR, including anti-apartheid campaigning and support work for Solidarnosc and movements in Latin America. However, differences between them and the leadership of the OCI appeared from 1985 when Harry Vince, along with 6 other members of Lambert's international leadership, criticised Lambert's Fourth International - International Centre of Reconstruction (FI-ICR) for, among other things, proposing to proclaim itself as the 'reconstructed' Fourth International, the continued Lambertist insistence on a decades long 'pre-revolutionary' period, (leading Francois de Massot to say that the British miners' strike was not a historic defeat), differences over tactics in Latin America and (for some) corrupt methods within the OCI. In 1987, all but four of the SLG sided with the wing of the FI-ICR linked to Luis Favre, Camilo Gonzalez, Roch Denis, Carol Coulter and others.

The SLG was briefly part of a Liaison Committee with those (in Brazil, Colombia, Quebec, Ireland, Sweden, Germany and France) who broke with Lambert in 1987. It also held discussions with Stéphane Just but by 1988 was discussing joining with the International Socialist Group (ISG) which was a section of the United Secretariat of the Fourth International (USec). The SLG dissolved itself in 1989 and its remaining members joined the ISG, although most of them left over the next few years. Harry Vince did not join the ISG and moved to Ireland where he became an editor of The Irish Reporter magazine. Other prominent ex-members of the Socialist Labour Group include Martin Wicks, (a leading RMT member and housing rights campaigner), Steve Lloyd, a CPSA/PCS activist, Mary Godfrey and Alan Green, (who became National Secretary of the Scottish Socialist Party).

The few members of the SLG who remained loyal to the OCI in 1987 were centred on Charlie Charalambous. This grouping had a tenuous existence for a few years, but John Archer, who had joined the ISG with the SLG majority, decided to rejoin with Lambert's international grouping and formed a small circle within the ISG supportive of the FI-ICR, including academic Helen Peters. In 1991 it split and rejoined with the 'Charalambous group' to form the British Committee of the European Workers' Alliance, a new Lambertist group which undertook entrism in the Labour Party and occasionally published the Fourth Internationalist Bulletin. Mike Calvert (sometimes known as Frank Wainwright) worked closely with John Archer at that time but later had his own differences with the Lambertists and is now associated with Workers Action. John Archer died in 2000 still seeing 'entry work' as his main political thrust. Today, this grouping is led by Stefan Cholewka, a Labour Party member in Rochdale. The British Section of the International Liaison Committee for a Workers' International. is a small group which occasionally publishes Workers' Unity and The Link. Regis Faugier, although not a member, has sometimes been associated with this grouping.
