= Alliance for Workers' Liberty =

Political party in the United Kingdom

- Leader: Executive Committee
- Founded: Workers' Fight (1966); International-Communist League (1975); Alliance for Workers' Liberty (1992)
- Split from: Revolutionary Socialist League; Militant tendency
- Headquarters: London
- Newspaper: Solidarity
- Membership: 140 (2016)
- Ideology: Orthodox Trotskyism (1966–1980s); Third camp Trotskyism (1980s–)
- Political position: Far-left
- National affiliation: Socialist Green Unity Coalition (2005–2010)
- Colours: Red

Website
- http://www.workersliberty.org/

The Alliance for Workers' Liberty (AWL), also known as Workers' Liberty, is a Trotskyist group in Britain and Australia founded in 1966. Originally a group called Workers' Fight that split from the Revolutionary Socialist League, it was a faction within the International Socialists between 1968 and 1971, before merging with Workers Power in 1975 to form the International-Communist League. Between 1981 and 1984, the I-CL was fused with the Workers' Socialist League, taking its name as well before splitting over the Falklands War. The group then became the Socialist Organiser Alliance, before being proscribed and expelled from the Labour Party in 1990, leading to the founding of the AWL in 1992.

The group has been identified with the theorist Sean Matgamna throughout its history. It publishes the newspaper Solidarity.

== History ==
=== Workers' Fight ===
The AWL traces its origins to the document What we are and what we must become, written by the tendency's founder Sean Matgamna in 1966, in which he argued that the Revolutionary Socialist League – by then effectively the Militant tendency – was too inward-looking, and needed to become more activist in its orientation. The RSL refused to circulate the document; hence, with a handful of supporters, he left to form the Workers' Fight group.

The group operated independently from 1967 until November 1968 when it joined the International Socialists (IS) and remained inside it as a Trotskyist faction until December 1971..

The group's position was originally closer to Orthodox Trotskyism and had split from the IS over attitudes towards the European Common Market.

The group clashed with the leadership of the International Socialists over many issues; for example, UK membership of the European Communities, on which the IS leadership itself was divided, and the use of the "Troops Out" slogan regarding Northern Ireland.

Outside the IS, the group resumed the usage of the name Workers' Fight, and publication of a paper (previously a duplicated journal) with the same name. The group also began publication of a theoretical journal entitled Permanent Revolution and made efforts to publish a small number of workplace-oriented publications in specific industries.

=== International-Communist League ===
In December 1975, Workers Fight merged with Workers Power group, both groups having split from the International Socialists, to form the International-Communist League. A small group of members in Bolton and Wigan opposed to the merger formed the Marxist Worker group, which later fused with the International Marxist Group.

Workers' Fight was renamed Workers' Action and went over to a weekly publication schedule and the group's quarterly magazine was now entitled International-Communist. It joined with other groups that considered themselves to the left of the USFI in the Necessary International Initiative.

In September 1976, Workers Power left the ICL in a dispute over Labour Party work and resumed a separate existence. The ICL increased its activity within the Labour Party, and in 1978 helped set up the Socialist Campaign for a Labour Victory, due to fears of defeat in the 1979 general election. This campaign proved relatively popular and initially involved a range of figures on the left of the Labour Party who wrote for and supported its newspaper, Socialist Organiser.

After a dispute over whether local government rates should be increased to offset cuts made by the Thatcher government, most of the Labour left figures - including Ken Livingstone - withdrew from Socialist Organiser until the I-CL was the only force involved in what was now its central publication. Both Workers' Action and International-Communist were by 1979 discontinued, reflecting the group's entryism into the Labour Party.

=== Workers' Socialist League ===
In 1981, the I-CL fused with parts of Alan Thornett's Workers Socialist League. The WSL had entered the Labour Party. The new organisation, also called the Workers' Socialist League, mostly worked through the Socialist Organiser Alliance. It also produced a theoretical journal, Workers' Socialist Review.

The Workers Internationalist League split from the WSL in May 1983.

In 1984, the groups split apart. The key issue was the Falklands War: most of the former I-CL including Sean Matgamna wanted to support neither side while former WSL members including Thornett argued that Argentina should win. The tensions had also been strained over questions of internal democracy and differences over the national question. Thornett left to form the Socialist Group.

=== Socialist Organiser Alliance ===
The Socialist Organiser Alliance grew from the broad-left Socialist Campaign for a Labour Victory. By 1983 the paper had become identified with Matgamna's supporters, leading to a split with Labour left politicians (such as Ken Livingstone) over the GLC's policy of increasing rates to offset cuts in central government grants to local councils.

The group organised its student work through the National Organisation of Labour Students (NOLS), forming Socialist Students in NOLS (SSiN) to campaign within the National Union of Students.

Throughout the 1980s the group had reassessed its politics and reappraised the Third Camp tradition of heterodox and dissident Trotskyists including Max Shachtman and Hal Draper. The group adopted a two-state position on Israel-Palestine, and in 1988, moved away from its original position that the Stalinist states were "deformed or degenerated workers states". By the 1990s the majority of organisation had adopted a bureaucratic collectivist analysis, with a minority holding a state capitalist position.

=== Alliance for Workers' Liberty ===
The newspaper Socialist Organiser was proscribed by the Labour Party conference in 1990. In response to the ban, the Socialist Organiser Alliance dissolved. In 1992, supporters of Socialist Organiser launched a new organisation known as the Alliance for Workers' Liberty. The AWL was involved in left unity initiatives such as the Socialist Alliance, Socialist Alliance Democracy Platform and Socialist Green Unity Coalition, and stood a parliamentary candidate in Camberwell and Peckham, while campaigning for Labour elsewhere. It also maintained a focus on pushing affiliated trade unions to assert themselves against the Labour leadership, and was involved in the establishment of the Labour Representation Committee in 2004.

In the late 1980s, it established and led a number of left opposition campaigns in the NUS, including Left Unity and the Campaign for Free Education and its supporters won seats in the structures of the NUS. Kat Fletcher, President of NUS from 2004 to 2006, was a member of the AWL and the Campaign for Free Education. It played leading roles in the NUS Women's and LGBT Campaigns, championing its policies on liberation and international solidarity within them, securing their representation within the NUS and working with groups such as OutRage! and Al-Fatiha. AWL was central to the Education Not for Sale network, and in 2010 helped found the National Campaign Against Fees and Cuts.

AWL has been more critical of political Islam than some other groups on the far left. In 2006, it reproduced the Muhammad cartoons that were originally published in Jyllands-Posten on its website, describing it as an issue of free speech. While it opposed the Iraq war, the group was critical of calls for the immediate withdrawal of US and UK forces, arguing that the likely consequence of a precipitate withdrawal would be increased sectarian violence that would snuff out the fledgling independent labour movement. A large minority within the organisation, while agreeing with the emphasis on solidarity with Iraqi workers, argued that the group should raise the call for the withdrawal of troops. These and other positions, including its support for a two-state settlement in Israel/Palestine, have led to other far-left groups characterising the AWL as "imperialist".

In 2009, AWL members were involved in supporting the sit-down strike of Vestas wind turbine factory workers on the Isle of Wight.

In the 2011 2011 Alternative Vote referendum, the Alliance for Workers' Liberty opposed the Alternative Vote proposal, arguing that it did not offer progress on the party's main democratic demands.

In 2013, the group launched a journal, Marxist Revival along with Iranians in the Iranian Revolutionary Marxist Tendency. It only published three total issues, and its failure may have influenced its full adoption of entryism into the Labour Party.

During the 2014 Scottish independence referendum, the AWL called for a vote against separation.

The Alliance for Workers' Liberty supported Jeremy Corbyn in the 2015 Labour leadership campaign. Two days after Corbyn's victory in the contest, the AWL applied to the Electoral Commission to be de-registered as a political party so as to allow its supporters to join the Labour Party. It campaigned against Brexit in the 2016 UK EU membership referendum.

in 2016, the then Deputy Leader of Labour Tom Watson challenged Jeremy Corbyn to proscribe groups such as the AWL and Momentum, describing the groups as "hard left" and "entryist".

In 2017, the AWL supported Labour in the 2017 general election, and again in 2019. Following Keir Starmer taking over as Leader of the Labour Party, In March 2022 the Labour's National Executive Committee voted to proscribe the AWL. The AWL also called for a Labour vote in every constituency in the 2024 general election, rejecting independent candidates such as Jeremy Corbyn and Andrew Feinstein as "unaccountable".

In 2018, a former member alleged that in 2005, when he was a 16-year-old member of the group, he had been sexually assaulted twice by an older, and by then also former, member. The group responded, acknowledging the allegations and initiating an investigation, but a motion was passed at the London Young Labour (LYL) conference in February 2018 to exclude members of supporters of AWL from LYL until the allegations were investigated.

== Activities ==
=== Membership ===
Since 1971 prospective Workers Fight/AWL members were required to go through an introductory period, in which they needed to make reports to their branch. They were also guided through a programme of books with the assistance of a mentor, which included the Communist Manifesto (Marx and Engels), Wage Labour and Capital, Value, Price and Profit, Theses on Feuerbach (Marx), Socialism: Utopian and Scientific (Engels), The State and Revolution, "Left-Wing" Communism: An Infantile Disorder (Lenin), and The Revolution Betrayed.

Recruitment methods led to the I-CL/AWL having lower numbers due to a focus on individuals rather than whole groups. The group also suffered from a high turn over in members, leading to the leadership in 1996 to state: "Over the last few years, the majority of people who have signed up as members have not in reality joined. Some we have literally never seen again."

=== Publications ===
The AWL has supported the newspaper Solidarity since 1995, and published it since 1999. Members of the AWL also publish a quarterly socialist feminist magazine, Women's Fightback. The group also published Workers' Liberty as a roughly quarterly magazine between 1985 and 2001. In 2001 and 2002, a second series of the magazine was published in a journal format. A third series of Workers' Liberty started in February 2006, taking the form of thematic collections issued as inserts within Solidarity. AWL also publishes occasional books and pamphlets, including The Fate of the Russian Revolution (a collection of "critical Marxist" and Third Camp Trotskyist writings on Soviet Russia, mainly from the Workers' Party and Independent Socialist League tradition), Working-class politics and anarchism (exploring the commonalities and differences between class-struggle anarchist and syndicalist traditions and the AWL's own brand of libertarian-tinged Trotskyism), and Antonio Gramsci: Working-class revolutionary (a short appraisal of the life and thought of the Italian Marxist agitator, organiser, and educator Antonio Gramsci).

The AWL helped to set up and was active in campaigns such as No Sweat, Feminist Fightback, Workers' Climate Action, the National Campaign Against Fees and Cuts, and local community campaigns such as the Save Lewisham Hospital campaign and the One Choice, One Dream alliance in Southampton.

In trade union work, AWL members focus on developing workplace and industrial bulletins, and rank-and-file networks such as the Education Solidarity Network in the National Education Union. It produces workplace and industrial bulletins including Tubeworker (for London Underground workers) and Off The Rails (for mainline railway workers).

=== Links with groups abroad ===
The group has international links with Workers' Liberty Australia and Solidarity in the United States. It has worked with groups on the left of the former Ligue Communiste Revolutionnaire (now part of the New Anticapitalist Party), and collaborated with Iraqi and Iranian groups from the Worker-Communist tradition. It also has links with L'Étincelle, a former fraction of Lutte ouvrière, the Iranian Revolutionary Marxist Tendency, and Turkish group Marksist Tutum. AWL members were also prominent in the Free Shahrokh Zamani and Reza Shahabi campaign, a solidarity campaign demanding the release of jailed Iranian trade unionists.

== Notable former members ==
- Journalist James Bloodworth
- Newsnight Scotland presenter Gordon Brewer
- Sociologist Robert Fine
- Rob Dawber, screenwriter of Ken Loach's The Navigators, who was still a member when he died
- Former National Union of Students president Kat Fletcher
- Political theorist Alan Johnson
- Former Labour MP Gloria De Piero
- Author and journalist Charlotte Raven
- Former Public and Commercial Services Union General Secretary Mark Serwotka
- Social theorist Martyn Hudson
