= Glastonbury Festival 1986 =

Music festival in England

- Locations: Worthy Farm, Pilton, Somerset, England
- Previous event: Glastonbury Festival 1985
- Next event: Glastonbury Festival 1987

Glastonbury CND Festival 1986 saw performances by The Cure, Madness, Simply Red, The Housemartins, The Waterboys, Pogues and Level 42. Tickets cost £17 and 60,000 attended.

A Classical Music tent was introduced curated by John Williams. This year saw Ruby Turner Live at Glastonbury as part of the BBC Radio 1 Live in Concert series. Tracks 17 ("We're Not Deep" – 2:24) and 18 ("Me and the Farmer" – 2:58) of the Housemartins' Live at the BBC were recorded during their performance. Latin Quarter played at Glastonbury Festival 21 June 1986.

The GLC provided had formed the Workers Beer Company, which was given further contracts by Tony Hollingsworth for Glastonbury in 1986 and 1987. It has continued to run festival or concert bars ever since including 2008 at Glastonbury. Half Man Half Biscuit's first single, "The Trumpton Riots", had topped the UK Indies Singles Chart in 1986, and they went on to perform at Glastonbury this year.

== Pyramid stage ==
Friday	Saturday	Sunday
Psychedelic Furs; Ruby Turner; The Pogues; The Waterboys; That Petrol Emotion; Amazulu; Howard Hughes and the Western Approaches	The Cure; Lloyd Cole and the Commotions; Black Uhuru and The Wailers; John Martyn; Loudon Wainwright III; Latin Quarter; Buddy Curtis and the Grasshoppers	Gil Scott-Heron; Level 42; Madness; Simply Red; Robert Cray; Christy Moore; The Housemartins

== Stage Two ==
Friday	Saturday	Sunday
The Ariwa Posse; The Go-Betweens; 3 Mustaphas 3; The June Brides; Flairck; Phranc; Pauline Black & the Supernaturals; The Forest Hill-Billies; Fission Brothers	The Potato Five; The Dream Syndicate; Half Man Half Biscuit; Ted Chippington; We've Got a Fuzzbox and We're Gonna Use It; The Nightingales; Frank Chickens; Andy White; The Brilliant Corners; Zinica; The Wonderful Kiosk	The Bloodfire Posse; Rent Party; The Woodentops; The Mighty Lemon Drops; Billy Bragg; Sambatucada; Robyn Hitchcock & The Egyptians; Microdisney; Loudon Wainwright III; Terry and Gerry
