= United Kingdom government austerity programme =

Fiscal policy

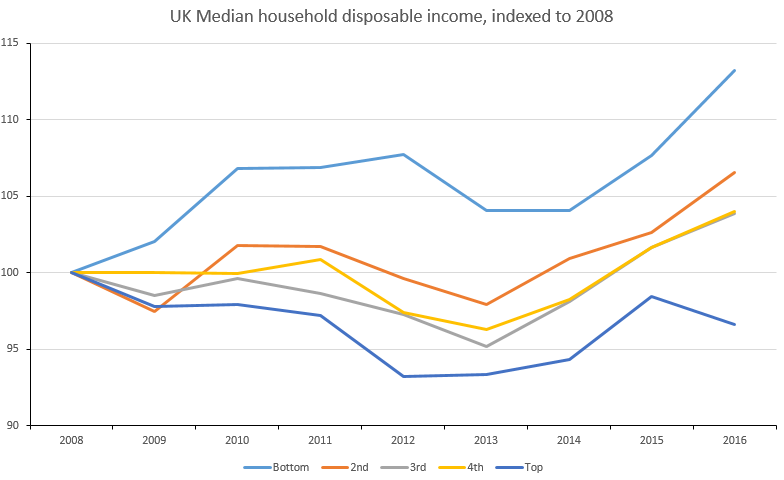
UK median household disposable income by income group for 2008–2016, indexed to 2008

The United Kingdom government austerity programme was a fiscal policy that was adopted for a period in the early 21st century following the era of the Great Recession. Coalition and Conservative governments in office from 2010 to 2019 used the term, and it was applied again by many observers to describe Conservative Party policies from 2021 to 2024, during the cost of living crisis. With the exception of the short-lived Truss ministry, the governments in power over the second period did not formally re-adopt the term. The two austerity periods are separated by increased spending during the COVID-19 pandemic. The first period was one of the most extensive deficit reduction programmes seen in any advanced economy since the Second World War, with emphasis placed on shrinking the state, rather than consolidating fiscally as was more common elsewhere in Europe.

The Conservative-led government claimed that austerity served as a deficit reduction programme consisting of sustained reductions in public spending and tax rises, ostensibly intended to reduce the government budget deficit and the role of the welfare state in the United Kingdom. Some commentators accepted this claim, but many scholars observe that its primary, largely unstated aim, like most austerity policies, was to restore the rate of profit. Most prominent economists agree that austerity is ineffective if the aim is to bring about a recovery from recession. Successive Conservative governments claimed that the National Health Service and education had ostensibly been "ringfenced" and protected from direct spending cuts, but between 2010 and 2019 more than £30 billion in spending reductions were made to welfare payments, housing subsidies, and social services.

There was no central function or risk assessment made to predict the impact of the austerity programme on services and budgets in the long term. There were however "big strategic moves" to protect groups more likely to vote Conservative, and make cuts elsewhere. This meant that the older groups like pensioners were largely protected, and the 2015 Conservative general election victory is credited to this tactic. During the second austerity period, a wider group than before were affected by the resulting cost-of-living crisis. This was connected to declining support for the Conservatives ahead of the 2024 general election, which resulted in a landslide defeat for the party. The Conservatives had planned further measures for after the election, some of which were leaked in advance.

The effects proved controversial and the policies received criticism from a variety of politicians, economists, and anti-austerity movements. Various authors and journalists have referred to this period as Britain's "lost decade". The British Medical Association nicknamed austerity "COVID's little helper" and connected British excess deaths to the effects of austerity on public services, however no causal link was shown and was assumed based upon life expectancy not rising in the UK at the same rate as other selected countries, excluding the United States which showed equal stagnation in life expectancy.

== History ==
=== First austerity period (2010–2019) ===
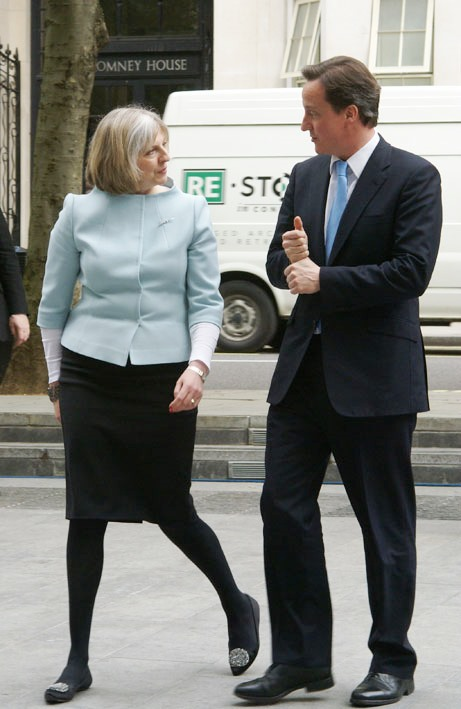
The first austerity period took place during the premierships of David Cameron (R) and Theresa May (L)

A UK government budget surplus in 2001-2 was followed by many years of budget deficit, and following the 2008 financial crisis, a period of economic recession began in the country. The first austerity measures were introduced in late 2008. In 2009, the term "age of austerity", which had previously been used to describe the years immediately following the Second World War, was popularised by Conservative Party leader David Cameron and future British chancellor George Osborne. The term at the time lacked the negative associations it would develop over the course of the following decade, and was somewhat synonymous with "prudence". In his keynote speech to the Conservative Party forum in Cheltenham on 26 April 2009, Cameron declared that "the age of irresponsibility is giving way to the age of austerity", and committed to end years of what he characterised as excessive government spending. Conservative Party leaders also promoted the idea of budget cuts bringing about the Big Society, a political ideology involving reduced government, with grass-roots organisations, charities and private companies delivering public services more efficiently. Osborne has been more dismissive in retrospect, acknowledging that the modernisation programme was simply the party "trying to win".

The austerity programme was initiated in 2010 by the Conservative and Liberal Democrat coalition government. In his June 2010 budget speech, Osborne identified two goals. The first was that the structural current budget deficit would be eliminated to "achieve [a] cyclically-adjusted current balance by the end of the rolling, five-year forecast period". The second was that national debt as a percentage of GDP would fall. The government intended to achieve both of its goals through substantial reductions in public expenditure. This was to be achieved by a combination of public spending cuts and tax increases amounting to £110 billion. Between 2010 and 2013, the Coalition government said that it had reduced public spending by £14.3 billion compared with 2009–10. Growth remained low, while unemployment rose. In a speech in 2013, David Cameron indicated that his government had no intention of increasing public spending once the structural deficit had been eliminated, and proposed that these spending reductions be made permanent. The end of the forecast period at the time was 2015–16, but the Treasury extended austerity until at least 2018. By 2015, the deficit, as a percentage of GDP, had been reduced to half of what it was in 2010, and the sale of government assets (mostly the shares of banks nationalised in the 2000s) had resulted in government debt as a proportion of GDP falling. By 2016, the Chancellor was aiming to deliver a budget surplus by 2020, but following the result of the 2016 United Kingdom European Union membership referendum, he expressed the opinion that this goal was no longer feasible.

Cuts in spending were not equally applied geographically, leading to some allegations that non-Conservative areas were being systematically targeted. Health expenditure in Blackpool (Labour) fell five times more per person than in Surrey (Conservative). Osborne has denied the cuts were applied in this way, but other Conservative staff members have since acknowledged "big strategic moves" that were made to favour demographic groups more likely to vote Conservative. This meant that the richest 20% of the population were essentially excluded from the impact of cuts. The approach was "devastatingly politically effective" according to Osborne, and is credited with the 2015 election win. British MP David Gauke also stated that this rebalancing had gone too far.

Osborne's successor as Chancellor, Philip Hammond, retained the aim of a balanced budget but abandoned plans to eliminate the deficit by 2020. In Hammond's first Autumn statement in 2016, there was no mention of austerity, and some commentators concluded that the austerity programme had ended. However, in February 2017, Hammond proposed departmental budget reductions of up to 6% for the year 2019–20, and Hammond's 2017 budget continued government policies of freezing working-age benefits. Following the 2017 snap general election, Hammond confirmed in a speech at Mansion House that the austerity programme would be continued and Michael Fallon, the Secretary of State for Defence, commented: "we all understand that austerity is never over until we've cleared the deficit". Government spending reductions planned for the period 2017–2020 are consistent with some departments, such as the Department for Work and Pensions and the Ministry of Justice, experiencing funding reductions of approximately 40% in real terms over the decade 2010–2020. During 2017, an overall budget surplus on day-to-day spending was achieved for the first time since 2001. This fulfilled one of the fiscal targets set by George Osborne in 2010, which he had hoped to achieve in 2015.

In 2018 the Office for Budget Responsibility (OBR) predicted that in 2018–19, public sector debt would fall as a share of national income for the first time since 2001–02, while tax revenues would exceed public spending. Hammond's 2018 Spring Statement suggested that austerity measures could be reduced in the Autumn Budget of that year. However, according to the Resolution Foundation and the Institute for Fiscal Studies (IFS), the OBR's forecasts for borrowing and debt were based on the assumption that the government continued with the planned spending reductions that were announced after the 2015 general election. By 2018, only 25% of the proposed reductions in welfare spending had been implemented. The Resolution Foundation, a British think tank, calculated that the proposed reduction in spending on working-age benefits amounted to £2.5 billion in 2018–19 and £2.7 billion in 2019–20, with the households most affected being the poorest 20%. The IFS calculated that the OBR's figures would require spending on public services per person in real terms to be 2% lower in 2022–23 than in 2019–20.

The deficit in the first quarter of the 2018–19 financial year was lower than at any time since 2007 and by August 2018 it had reached the lowest level since 2002–3. Hammond's aim at this time was to eliminate the deficit entirely by the mid-2020s. At the Conservative Party conference in October 2018 Prime Minister Theresa May indicated her intention to end the austerity programme following Brexit in 2019, and opposition leader Jeremy Corbyn said that austerity could not be ended without significant increases in public spending. The IFS calculated that funding an end to austerity would require an additional £19 billion per year raised through higher government borrowing or tax increases. Hammond's preference was to reduce the national debt with more years of austerity, but in the October 2018 budget he agreed to defer the target date for eliminating the deficit, abandoning plans to achieve a surplus in 2022–23 to allow an increase in health spending and tax cuts. The Resolution Foundation described the step as a "significant easing of austerity". Hammond said that the "era of austerity is finally coming to an end" but that there would be no "real terms" increase in public spending apart from on the NHS.

The end of austerity was declared by Hammond's successor Sajid Javid in September 2019, though the Institute for Fiscal Studies expressed doubts that the planned spending in the Conservative manifesto for the 2019 election would constitute a true end to austerity, with spending per capita still 9% lower than 2010 levels.

=== Pandemic-era spending (2020–2021) ===
The spending plans were dramatically altered in early 2020, with the following two years characterised by vast spending brought on by the COVID-19 pandemic. The UK suffered its deepest recession in 300 years. Government spending jumped from 39.1% of GDP to 51.9%, widening the deficit to a level not seen even during the 2008 financial crisis, and reversing austerity era efforts to balance national finances. The government abandoned efforts to lower the national debt across the lifetime of the 2019 parliament, as had been planned, instead adopting policies, described by Will Hutton in The Guardian as Keynesian, during the pandemic. The Eat Out to Help Out scheme in particular has been cited as an example of this.

=== Second austerity period (2021–2024) ===
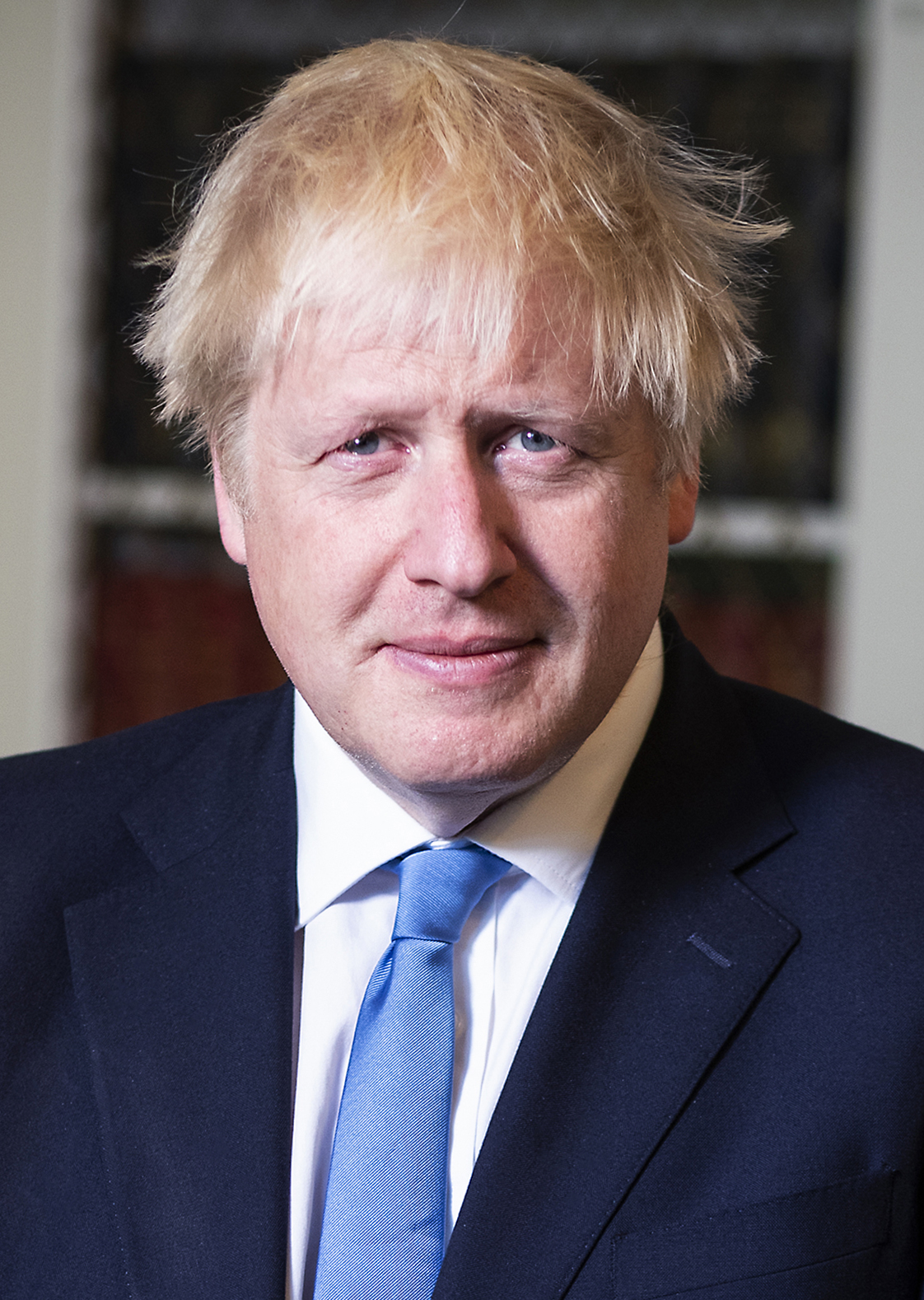
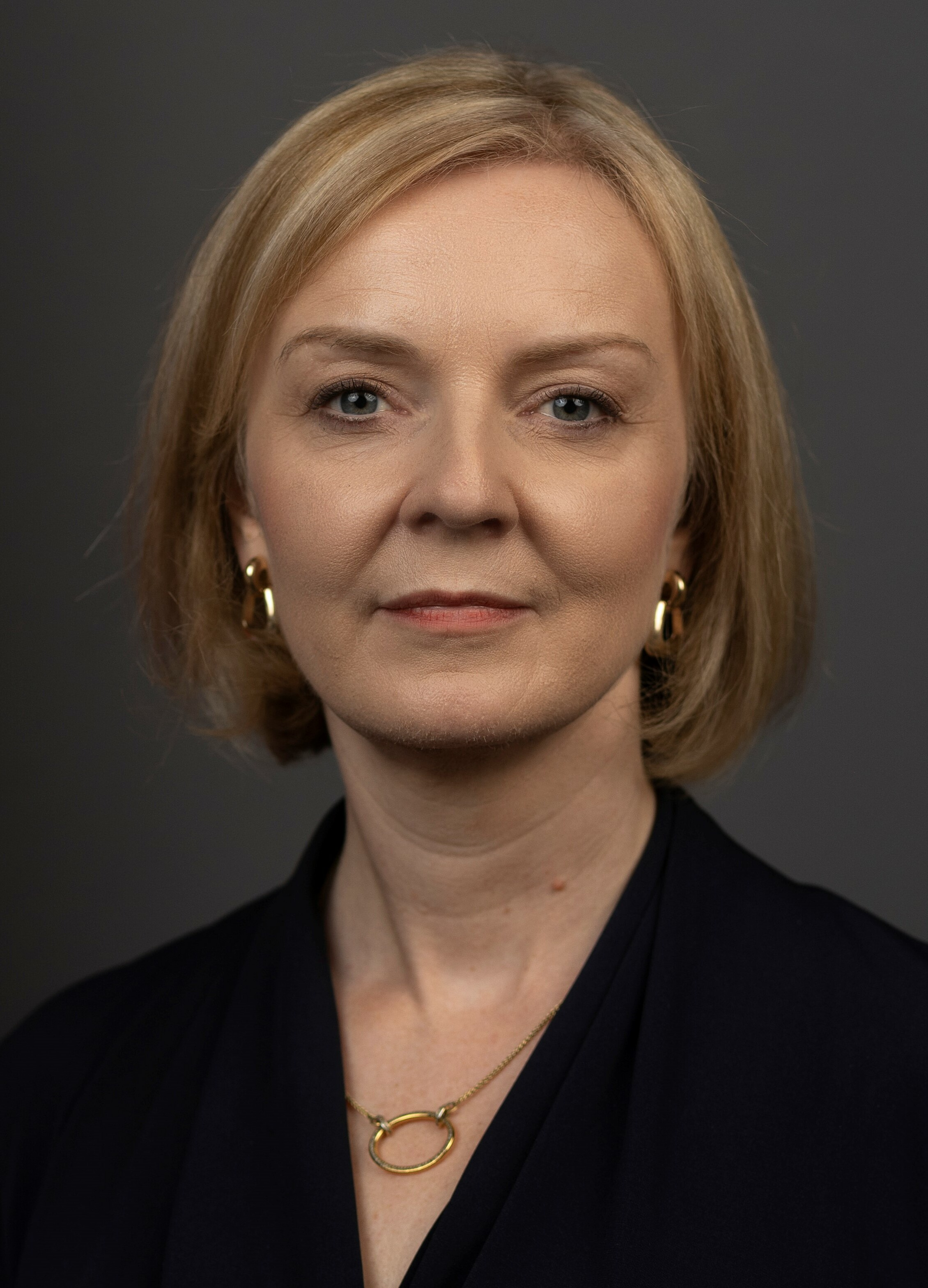
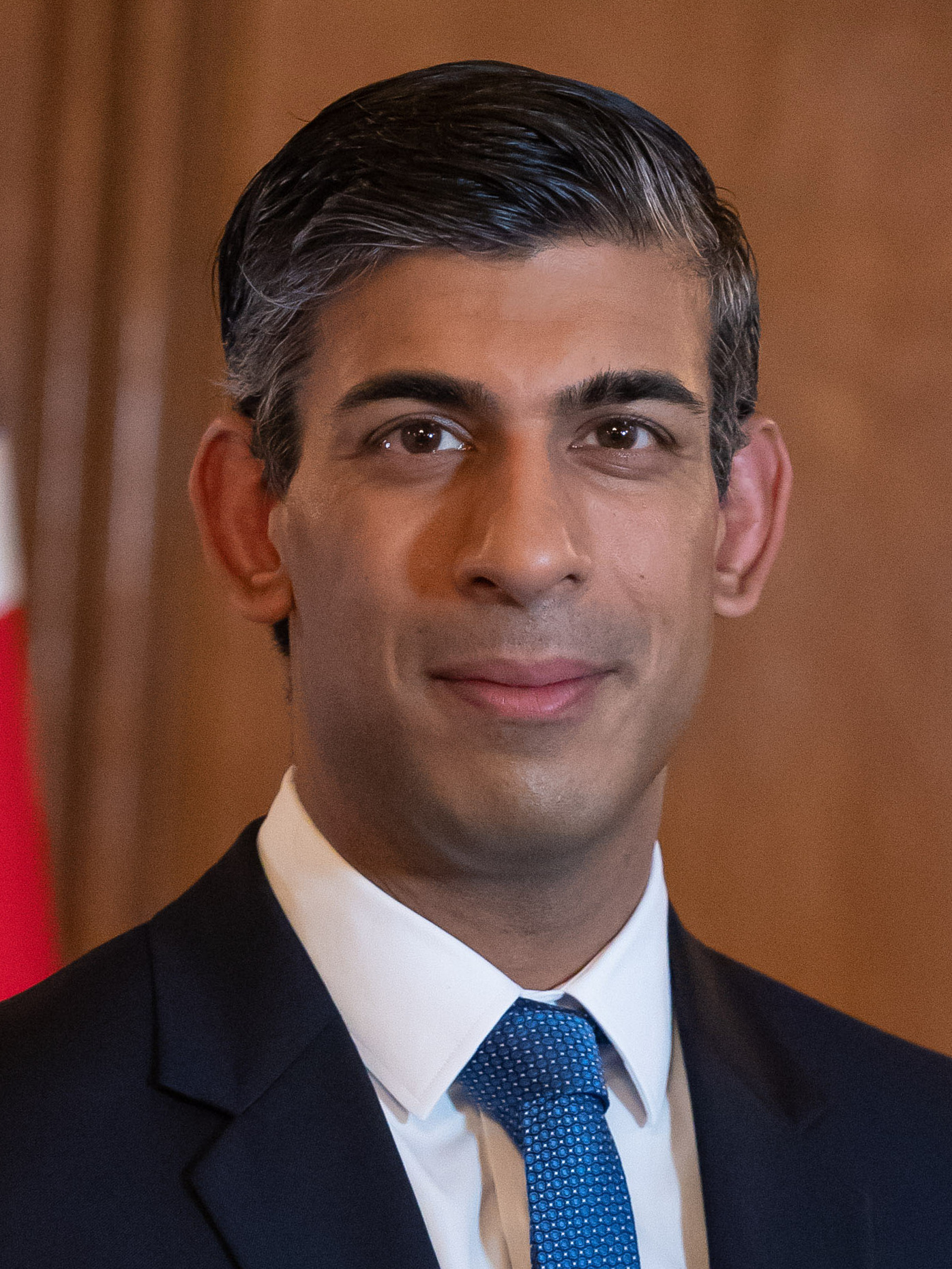
The second period took place during the premierships of Boris Johnson (L) and Rishi Sunak (R) . Liz Truss (M) also announced but failed to enact further measures.

Beginning during the latter part of the premiership of Boris Johnson, high inflation, high taxation, and the removal of temporary COVID-era support measures culminated in a cost of living crisis. The Johnson ministry embarked on a series of cuts, which continued throughout the Truss and Sunak ministries. Johnson and Sunak avoided using the term austerity, though it was adopted again by the Truss ministry. The period from 2021 onwards is referred to as a "second era" or "second period" of austerity by many observers.

The Johnson ministry made cuts to Universal Credit in September 2021, and this was described by some as an austerity policy. UK in a Changing Europe described the period as "round two", viewing the Johnson government's 2022 spring statement as a turning point similar to the October 2010 statement then delivered by George Osborne, at the initiation of austerity. This view was shared by The Guardian, which described the period from Spring 2022 onward as "another era", and The Telegraph, which termed it "another ill-judged bout". Johnson announced his resignation that July, amid a Conservative rebellion sparked in part over the cost of living crisis.

Shortly after the beginning of the premiership of Liz Truss in September 2022, the Secretary of State for Levelling Up, Housing and Communities Simon Clarke announced a "New age of austerity", saying that the country had a "very large welfare state" and that the government would "trim the fat". The scope or detail of these planned cuts were not announced at the time, though by some estimates Truss' tax changes, announced in a mini-budget that September, added 32 billion pounds to an existing 6 billion pound deficit, that would have either required significant borrowing or cuts to fill. It was revealed in 2024 that the Truss ministry considered cutting NHS cancer treatment. The then-unknown cuts and tax changes caused market turbulence over the following week, including a reduction in the value of the pound, rises in government borrowing costs, and the removal of 40% of all mortgage products from the UK market. Facing backlash, chancellor Kwasi Kwarteng denied that there would be new austerity measures the following day, after the government was forced into a U-turn on taxation. The Truss ministry was ultimately unable to enact any of its planned reforms, as Kwarteng was sacked on 15 October and Truss announced her own resignation on the 20th.

Rishi Sunak became prime minister after Truss stepped down and quickly announced that a new budget would be forthcoming, with "difficult decisions" made. The government faced higher borrowing costs due to market fallout after the mini-budget and the collapse of the Truss ministry. His plans drew warning from Olivier de Schutter, the UN poverty envoy, who stated that the coming wave of austerity "could violate the UK's international human rights obligations and increase hunger and malnutrition." Sunak's tax rises, alongside major cuts, were referred to as "embracing austerity" by Time. By the time of the 2023 Spring Statement, Britain faced the largest two year decline in living standards since records began in the 1950s, due to persistent inflation, fiscal drag, and taxation at a post-war record high. Further cuts to departments outside of defence and health were planned for the following five years. In 2023, Birmingham city council was forced to issue a 114 notice, effectively declaring bankruptcy, which drew attention to the level of cuts imposed on local government funding since 2010. The Guardian termed this as 13 years of austerity within the local government funding context, however £840m of the councils debts are attributed to equal pay claims and IT implementation failures.

The Labour party pledged that there would be "No return to austerity", should they win the 2024 general election. The labour party did indeed win in a landslide, which commentators attributed to the legacy of austerity and the strain it placed on public services. While the Labour party did disavow any further austerity, The Guardian noted that there is no stated plan to reverse austerity either.

=== Conservative proposals for after 2024 ===
In 2024, the Resolution Foundation calculated that the government had "pencilled in" further cuts to public services following the 2024 general election. That is, the tax cuts offered shortly before the election were funded by proposed budget cuts to take place in the 2024–2029 parliament, should the Conservatives have won. To balance the budget, these cuts would have had to take place on a scale similar to the first phase of austerity in the 2010–2015 parliament, including around 20% to unprotected departments such as the Ministry of Justice, Department for Levelling Up, Housing and Communities and the Home Office. A leak in April 2024 revealed that the government planned to cut cold weather payments after the election. The Institute for Fiscal Studies commented that based on the plans, "it seems likely the range and quality of public services would have to suffer at some point". When they launched their manifesto that June, the Conservatives confirmed that 12 billion pounds would be cut from welfare. Jeremy Hunt referred to the plans as an "enormous back-to-work programme" in a newsletter during the campaign. At Oxford University he also spoke positively of Liz Truss' economic plans, adding that he wanted to "basically achieve some of the same things that she wanted to achieve."

The plans were not enacted in full as the Conservatives were defeated in the election. However, a similar winter fuel cut was enacted by the incoming Labour government.

=== Later use of the term ===
In the summer of 2024 the Labour government introduced the means-testing of the Winter Fuel Payment, an annual grant paid to people of pension age, while refusing to relax restrictions on some other benefits. Some commentators referred to this as a new period of austerity. The process of reassessing claims for Personal Independence Payment, a disability benefit, was continued in order to make savings expected to be £150m per year by 2028. After the first budget in October 2024, the BBC however stated that increases in public sector funding meant that "A line [could] be drawn under the years of austerity."

== Effects ==
The austerity programme included reductions in welfare spending, the cancellation of school building programs, reductions in local government funding, and an increase in VAT. Spending on the police, courts and prisons was also reduced. A number of quangos were abolished, merged or reduced as a result of the 2010 UK quango reforms.

=== Economy ===
Wage growth in the UK was stagnant after the recession, and faced further stagnation and decline throughout the austerity period. After accounting for inflation, wages had declined to 2005 levels by 2023. As the minimum wage continued to increase while overall wages were stagnant, the proportion of workers in minimum wage jobs increased from 4% to 10% in the decade to 2018. The gender pay gap narrowed over the course of the austerity period from 22% in 2009 to 14.3% in 2023; due to a decline in the wages of low-paid men, more of whom were on the minimum wage by 2023. The productivity of the UK's economy was also largely stagnant from 2007 onwards. Productivity began to decline again in early 2022, which tipped the economy back into recession in 2023.

Poor economic performance has led some to refer to Britain as the "sick man of Europe", a nickname previously applied to the country during its economic turmoil in the 1970s. The name has been applied in the early 2020s by outside commentators such as The Economist, as well as Conservative party donors. The period is sometimes referred to as the "lost decade", again a term last used to describe the British economy in the 1970s.

=== Arts and culture ===
The Local government in England is one of the main contributors to the funding of the arts, spending more than £1 billion annually. However, due to austerity policies and challenges to sustainability in recent years, council spending on arts and culture development has suffered significant reductions. A report by the Arts Council England revealed that arts and culture had suffered a £236 million (20%) decline from 2010 to 2020. By 2023 arts council funding had declined 63% in Northern Ireland, 21% in Wales, and 30% in England. In the Birmingham area, council arts funding will cease entirely in 2026.

==== Libraries ====
Public libraries are funded by local governments to provide free services that enrich culture, information and education. The emergence of austerity and subsequent cuts to local government funding has caused library services to suffer – including the closure of almost 800 public libraries since the launch of austerity in 2010.

Currently, library services are governed by the Public Libraries and Museums Act 1964, which outlines the duty of local authorities to provide a 'comprehensive and efficient library service for all'. Part of this duty involves an understanding of priorities and financial constraints of local councils, which has specifically been subject to the impact of austerity over recent years. According to the Chartered Institute of Public Finance and Accountancy (CIPFA), there were 3,583 library branches in England, Wales and Scotland that collectively employed 15,300 people alongside 51,000 volunteers in 2019. Prior to this, there were 35 library closures since 2018 and a huge 773 closures since 2010. Library closures have also been reflected in the use of public libraries. CIPFA noted that library visitors across the UK have substantially declined from 335 million annual visitors in 2005 to 215 million in 2019/20.

With regards to local government spending on libraries, CIPFA released data to show that spending fell from £1 billion in 2009/10 to £774.8 million in 2018/19 with a further 2.6% decline in 2019/20 to £725 million. These budget cuts have only furthered as a result of the COVID-19 pandemic, accompanied by an increased demand for digital and remote library services. The pandemic has seen an increase of 600% for digital borrowing and an increase of 400% for e-lending. As a result of this, the future of public libraries is uncertain. It may be that following the pandemic, their services could undergo dramatic changes within local communities that are more accommodating to their reduced funding as a result of austerity.

==== Museums ====
National museums in the United Kingdom are typically run and funded by the government. However, there are some museums which have separate agreements with local authorities meaning they receive financial support through government programmes. The extent of this funding has been greatly reduced since the beginning of austerity. For example, between 2007 and 2017, museums suffered a 13% reduction in funding, resulting in the closure of at least 64 museums between 2010 and 2019 and visitor numbers halving from 8,000 to 4,000 between 2010 and 2015.

Whilst museums are free of charge in order to broaden the demographic of visitors and provide universal access, many museums have had to result to privatisation in order to accommodate budget cuts. 2013 saw the outsourcing of security at the British Museum, followed by the Imperial War Museum in 2014 and the National Gallery in 2015.

The budget cuts stemming from austerity have also been exacerbated by the COVID-19 pandemic. A report conducted by the Institute for Fiscal Studies (IFS) highlighted that £5.2 billion has been promised by the government to councils, despite the extra spending of £4.4 billion due to the pandemic and an overall budget pressure of £7.2 billion for 2020/21. This £2 billion budget gap will likely result in greater cuts to services provided by museums.

See also: Impact of the COVID-19 pandemic on the arts and cultural heritage

=== Child health and poverty ===
Between 1998 and 2012 the number of children living in "relative poverty" in the UK had fallen by approximately 800,000 to a total of around 3.5 million. Following the introduction of the Welfare Reform Act 2012 the number of children in "relative poverty" increased, with the total by 2019 around 600,000 higher than it had been in 2012. During those seven years the number of children obtaining food from the food banks of The Trussell Trust more than tripled.

The human height of British children growing up during the years of austerity has decreased: as of 2019, the average five-year-old boy measured 112.5 centimetres (3 ft 8.3 in) and the average girl 111.7 centimetres (3 ft 8.0 in). They were shorter and more obese than many of their European peers.

=== Demographics ===
A number of independent reports have considered the demographic effects of the austerity programme. In 2011, activist collective Feminist Fightback described its gendered impact and in 2012 the Fawcett Society published a report which was critical of the Treasury for not assessing the impact of austerity on women's equality. A 2015 report by the Resolution Foundation identified age-related disparities in the effects of austerity changes. The report projected that during the 2010s transfers to local authorities would fall by 64% and that spending on working-age welfare would fall by 71%, while between 1997 and 2020 spending on older people and health would rise from 33.8% to 43.4% of total government spending. In the same year a group of political scientists at the University of Nottingham found that the impact of austerity on in-work benefits and housing policy had been harmful to working families with children, while wealthy pensioners and older homeowners had benefited. In 2016 research from the Women's Budget Group and the Runnymede Trust indicated that women, people of colour and in particular women of colour had been affected most by austerity, and that they would continue to be affected disproportionately until 2020. This was due to the fact that black and Asian women were more likely to be employed in the public sector, be in low-paid jobs and insecure work, and experience higher levels of unemployment than other groups.

Research published in 2017 by the Joseph Rowntree Foundation identified an increase in child poverty and pensioner poverty compared to the previous year, following significant overall decreases during the previous 20 years. Reductions in benefit support and a shortage of affordable housing were considered to be contributing factors.

=== Food banks ===
Researchers have linked budget cuts and sanctions against benefit claimants to increasing use of food banks. In a twelve-month period from 2014 to 2015, over one million people in the United Kingdom had used a food bank, representing a "19% year-on-year increase in food bank use". The use of food banks almost doubled between 2013 and 2017. A study published in The British Medical Journal in 2015 found that each one percentage point increase in the rate of Jobseeker's Allowance claimants sanctioned was associated with a 0.09 percentage point rise in food bank use. Research by The Trussell Trust found that the use of food banks increased more in areas where Universal Credit was introduced.

However, the Organisation for Economic Co-operation and Development found that the number of people answering yes to the question "Have there been times in the past 12 months when you did not have enough money to buy food that you or your family needed?" decreased from 9.8% in 2007 to 8.1% in 2012, leading some to say that the rise was due to both more awareness of food banks, and the government allowing Jobcentres to refer people to food banks when they were hungry, in contrast to previous governments.

=== Housing ===
==== Social housing ====
When the coalition government came to power in 2010, capital investment in new affordable homes was cut by 60%, while government-imposed caps on local authority borrowing continued to restrict their ability to raise money to build new homes. Writing in Inside Housing, former housing minister John Healey observed that rate of starting social rented schemes had declined from 40,000 in 2009/10 to less than 1,000 in 2015/16. When the government eventually released its "Affordable Homes Programme" for 2011-2015 and accompanying funding guidelines, it established a new type of affordable housing—"affordable rent" that can be up to 80% of the market rent and hence at levels that can be significantly higher than social rents, and affordable rents are around 30% higher than social rents on average among housing association properties. The provision of affordable rent is meant to compensate for the drastically reduced central government subsidy for new social housing (an average of £20,000 per home in 2012 versus £60,000 per home under the previous National Affordable Housing Programme 2008–2011), allowing housing associations and local authorities to raise more revenue from rent payments to be used for long-term capital investments.

By 2018, a large majority of newly built social housing in England was created for affordable rent instead of the often much lower social rent, while the proportion of new-build social housing using affordable rent has been much less significant in Wales and Scotland, where most new-build social housing continues to be built for social rent levels, while in Northern Ireland the affordable rent product has not been used. Meanwhile, in London more than 10,000 existing properties that were previously let at social rent levels have been changed to affordable rent. Though housing benefit tenants, exempt as they are from LHA rates, are not directly affected by the move towards "affordable" as opposed to social rents, a large number of in-work tenants who may not qualify for any housing benefit will be directly affected by the higher rents. The number of people sleeping rough on any one night across England had more than doubled between 2010 and 2016 to an estimated 4,134, according to a government street count.

==== Housing benefit ====
The benefit cap, introduced via the Welfare Reform Act 2012, set a maximum level for the amount of state welfare benefits that could be paid to an individual household in any one year. The measure came into effect in 2013 with the figure initially set at £26,000 per year, close to the average income of a family in the UK at that time. The anticipated reduction in government expenditure as a result of the measure was £225 million by April 2015. The benefit cap initially affected approximately 12,000 households, mainly in high-rent areas of the UK such as London, but in 2016/17 the limit was reduced to £20,000 per annum (£23,000 in London) extending its effects to around 116,000 households across the UK.

A Local Housing Allowance (LHA) policy restricting Housing Benefit for private sector tenants to cover a maximum number of rooms had been in place since 2008 and was initially set at the 50th percentile of rents in an area (essentially it covered the median rent), while in 2011 the calculation was changed to the equivalent of the 30th percentile of rents (the cheapest third of housing in an area) and the following year instead of updating the LHA rates the government announced that instead rates would increase by a maximum equivalent to the rise of the Consumer Price Index. In 2015 the government announced a complete four year freeze on LHA rates (with some of the areas experiencing higher rents having their LHA lifted by 3% with Targeted Affordability Funding). Additionally, non-disabled persons under 35 saw their LHA payment restricted to the shared accommodation rate (instead of the one-bedroom rate that had previously been available). Research found that this reform increased evictions, homelessness, and local council costs, while central government fiscal savings were largely offset by increased council spending on temporary accommodation for homelessness prevention.

The under-occupancy penalty, introduced in 2013 and commonly known as the "bedroom tax", affected an estimated 660,000 working age social housing tenants in the UK, reducing weekly incomes by £12–£22. Almost two thirds of the people affected by the penalty were disabled. The measure reduced the expenditure of the Department for Work and Pensions by approximately £500 million per year. In 2015, George Osborne announced that tenants in social housing would have their housing benefit limited to LHA rates (used for private-sector tenants) from 2019, though Theresa May announced in 2017 that this policy had been scrapped.

From April 2016 the LHA rates used to calculate maximum housing benefit levels for private sector tenants were frozen for four years. Research by the housing charity Shelter indicated that the proportion of such tenants likely to experience a shortfall in housing benefit was 80%, amounting to 300,000 families. The degree of shortfall depends on dwelling, location and individual circumstances, but Shelter expected that by 2020 the shortfall could in some cases reach hundreds of pounds a month.

In April 2017, housing benefit payments were ended for new claims made by people aged 18–21. Research by Heriot-Watt University found that the policy would reduce annual government expenditure by £3.3 million.

During the period of austerity, the rate of homelessness rapidly increased. For example, during 2016 the rate of homelessness increased by 16%. By 2018 the number of families living in bed and breakfast accommodation was almost 50,000, and there were many more "hidden homeless" people living on the floors and sofas of friends and acquaintances. An article in The BMJ regarded this as a "neon sign that something is fundamentally wrong" with how society is being run, noting that "homeless women die on average at 43 and homeless men at 47, compared with 77 for the rest of us". The Office for National Statistics estimated that 597 homeless people died in England and Wales in 2017, an increase of 24% since 2012.

Research was published in 2018 by Shelter analysing government data. It indicated that all forms of homelessness had increased since 2010 and that the number of households living in temporary accommodation had risen to more than 79,000. By 2017 over 33,000 families living in temporary accommodation were working, a proposition that had increased from 44% in 2013 to 55% in 2017. Shelter attributed this to a combination of higher rents, the freeze on housing benefits and the shortage of social housing.

=== Local government ===
The Local Government Association has identified a decrease in UK Government funding of almost 60 per cent for local authorities in England and Wales between 2010 and 2020. The reduction in central government funding for county councils in England combined with an increasing demand for social care services has caused reductions in expenditure on other services such as public libraries, refuse collection, road maintenance and Sure Start, along with increases to council Tax rates and the introduction of additional charges for county council services. Local authority subsidies to bus services were reduced by almost half between 2010 and 2018.

Research by the Local Government Chronicle has indicated that between 2010 and 2018 there were more than 220,000 redundancies of local authority employees and nearly £4 billion was spent on redundancy payments, excluding outsourcing contracts. Rob Whiteman of CIPFA commented that "this scale of job losses reflects the intense financial pressure on councils as they now have no option other than to provide the bare minimum statutory provisions". Analysis by the Local Government Association in 2018 identified a decrease in the Revenue Support Grant for local authorities in England from £9,927 million in 2015–16 to £2,284 million for 2019–20, leaving 168 authorities with no grant for 2019–20. UK government plans in 2018 proposed the phasing out of grants to local authorities in England, instead funding English local government through a combination of local business rates and council tax.

Scholars link these austerity-driven funding cuts to wider consequences, including higher support for Brexit and weakened local state capacity that hindered delivery of climate retrofit programmes.

Research by the University of Cambridge published in 2018 said that the greatest reductions in local authority spending had occurred in impoverished post-industrial cities in the north of England and some poor Inner London boroughs. Over 30 such authorities in England had reduced spending by more than 30% between 2010 and 2017, with seven of them reducing spending by more than 40%. In contrast councils in wealthier areas had made smaller reductions. Councils in England experienced an average spending reduction of 24% compared to 12% in Scotland and 11.5% in Wales, the difference resulting from devolved government in those nations.

In 2018 Northamptonshire County Council become insolvent and proposed reducing services to the minimum required by law. Austerity measures were blamed for the insolvency, as was the council's refusal to raise council tax despite the rising costs of providing social services. At the time the National Audit Office said that up to 15 other local authorities were also at risk of insolvency. A survey of council leaders, chief executives and mayors conducted by the New Local Government Network indicated that more than 70% of respondents expected that they would be unable to provide non-statutory services beyond 2023 if funding remained as restricted as it had been since 2010. In early 2019, three quarters of councils said they would have to raise taxes close to the legal maximum in order to cover costs, though many would nevertheless be cutting services.

=== Mental health ===
A 2012 article by Martin Knapp published in The BMJ's journal Evidence-Based Mental Health said that mental health problems could be attributed to a person's financial situation. At that time 45% of those who were in debt had mental health problems, compared to 14% of those who were not in debt. In 2010 over 40% of benefit claimants in Britain had "mental and behavioural disorders" recorded as their primary health condition.

A 2015 report published by Psychologists for Social Change indicated that austerity had contributed significantly to the incidence and level of depression and other mental health conditions within the population.

In 2016, figures analysed by the King's Fund think tank showed that "mental health trusts in England were still having their budgets cut, despite government assurances they would be funded on a par with physical healthcare". The analysis "suggests 40% of the 58 trusts saw budgets cut in 2015–16".

A 2016 report authored by the NatCen Social Research for UNISON showed that LGBT people had suffered from a lack of access to mental health services as a result of austerity.

=== Mortality ===
Research funded by the National Institute for Health and Care Research and published in 2015 identified austerity as one of the factors responsible for a rise in suicide attempts and suicide deaths since 2008, particularly in regard to Jobcentre policies. In 2017, the Royal Society of Medicine said that government austerity decisions in health and social care were likely to have resulted in 30,000 deaths in England and Wales in 2015. Research by University College London published in BMJ Open in 2017 compared the figures for health and social care funding during the 2000s with that during the period 2010–2014. It found that annual growth in health funding during the 2000s was 3.8%, but after 2010 this dropped to 0.41%. Annual growth in social care funding of 2.2% during the 2000s became an annual decrease of 1.57% after 2010. This coincided with mortality rates decreasing by 0.77% annually during the 2000s but rising by 0.87% annually after 2010.

The rate of increase in life expectancy in England nearly halved between 2010 and 2017, according to research by epidemiology professor Michael Marmot. He commented that it was "entirely possible" that austerity was the cause and said: "If we don't spend appropriately on social care, if we don't spend appropriately on health care, the quality of life will get worse for older people and maybe the length of life, too."

A study published in BMJ Open in 2017 linked austerity to 120,000 extra deaths in England, primarily as a result of a reduction in the number of nurses. Another study put it at 130,000. By 2018 figures from the Office for National Statistics (ONS) were showing a fall in life expectancy for those in poorer socioeconomic groups and those living in deprived areas, while average UK life expectancy had stopped improving. Public Health England was asked to carry out a review of life expectancy trends but government ministers said that the arguments put forward by some academics, that austerity had contributed to the change, could not be proved. ONS figures published in 2018 indicated that the slowdown in general life expectancy increase was one of the highest among a group of 20 of the world's leading economies.

=== Police and crime ===
Between 2010 and 2019 in England and Wales the number of police officers employed was reduced by approximately 20,000. At the same time the measured incidence of murder and robbery increased to their highest levels since the 2000s. Some police leaders have suggested that the reduction in police numbers is the cause, while other analysts have proposed reductions in spending on youth services and social services as the cause.

=== Public sector pay ===
There are approximately five million public sector workers in the UK. Between 2011 and 2013 there was a two-year pay freeze for all public sector workers earning an annual salary of £21,000 or more, which was expected to reduce public expenditure by £3.3 billion by 2014–15. In subsequent years a public sector pay cap resulted in annual public sector wage increases being effectively capped at 1% for 2013–2016, extended to 2020 in the 2015 budget. Advice was given to ministers by the civil service that the policy would result in a pay cut for many people in real terms and could increase child poverty. By 2015 the number of people employed in the Civil Service had been reduced to the lowest level since the Second World War and public sector employees made up 17.2% of the total workforce, the smallest proportion since comparable records began in 1999. During the 2017 general election the Conservative Party proposed retaining the cap until 2020, potentially reducing public sector expenditure by £5bn. A Labour Party amendment to the 2017 Queen's Speech proposing the removal of the cap was defeated. A 2017 report commissioned by the Office of Manpower Economics indicated that between 2005 and 2015 median hourly earnings fell by 3% in real terms for public sector workers whose salaries are set on the advice of pay review bodies (around 45% of public sector staff). In September 2017, the Scottish Government announced that it intended to end the public sector pay cap in Scotland from 2018, and shortly afterwards the UK government announced the ending of the cap in England and Wales. By autumn 2017 public sector pay had fallen behind private sector pay for comparable work.

=== Social security ===
Working-age social security payments such as Universal Credit, Child Benefit, Child tax credit and Working Tax Credit, Housing Benefit and Jobseeker's Allowance have had their rate of increase reduced by austerity. From 2013 onwards, these payments were limited to a maximum annual increase of 1% instead of being increased annually according to the rate of inflation, while Child Benefit, previously available to all UK households with minor children was means-tested for the first time, with households where at least one parent earning over £50,000 a year having their amount reduced. The policy of suspending the social security payments of unemployed claimants who were judged not to be adequately seeking work was continued, and the frequency and severity of the sanctions were increased. From 2016 a four-year freeze on all working-age social security payments was introduced. It was anticipated that it would affect 11 million UK families and reduce expenditure by £9 billion, a figure later increased to £13 billion. The Welfare Reform and Work Act 2016 abolished the Work-Related Activity Component of Employment and Support Allowance for new claimants from April 2017. This reduced the weekly social security payments for the disabled people affected by £29.05 a week (at 2017/18 rates). The reduction in government expenditure was initially forecast to be £640 million per annum by 2020/21, though this was later revised to £450 million.

Analysis in 2018 by the Resolution Foundation indicated that by April 2019 the freeze in social security payments would have resulted in more than 10 million households experiencing a loss of income in real terms, with the lack of an inflation-related increase in 2019 resulting in the average low-income couple with children losing an additional £210 per year. The analysis also said that the cumulative effect of these social security limitations had been to reduce the value of working-age benefits by more than 6% in real terms. Child Benefit had become worth less than it was in 1999 in real terms, and for a second child it was worth 14% less than when it was introduced in 1979.

=== State Pension ===
The value of the State Pension has not been subject to austerity measures, being increased each year since 2011 by a minimum of 2.5% per annum. However, some people have been adversely affected financially in their 60s by the rise in the age at which the State Pension is first paid. The decision to equalise the State Pension ages of men and women was made by the government in 1995. From 2010 the women's State Pension age was steadily raised from 60 with the aim of matching that of men at 65 by 2018. An additional increase to 66 for both sexes is intended to be implemented by 2020. Research by the Institute for Fiscal Studies (IFS) in 2017 found that the household incomes of over one million women aged between 60 and 62 had become £32 a week lower on average, and that poverty rates among that group had risen. The IFS also calculated that the reduction in state expenditure combined with the additional tax income from women continuing to work in their 60s resulted in a net increase in state revenue of £5.1 billion per year.

A rise in the State Pension age to 67 for both sexes in 2036 had been proposed by Gordon Brown in the 2000s, followed by a rise to 68 in 2046. By 2014 the date set for the rise to 67 had been brought forward to 2026 and in 2018 the rise to 68 was brought forward to 2037. This last change alone resulted in an anticipated reduction in DWP expenditure of £74bn by 2046–47.

== Northern Ireland ==
Reductions in public expenditure in Northern Ireland have often been described as not as harsh as those for the UK as a whole. This is primarily due to the fact that the UK government has not been able to exert direct control over welfare expenditure in Northern Ireland, because welfare policy is a devolved matter for the Northern Ireland Assembly. On a number of occasions the Assembly has not agreed to cuts in public spending, effectively refusing to make them, despite pressure from the UK government. However, the UK government has sought to recoup the expected savings through a fine on Northern Ireland's block grant, which is calculated according to the Barnett formula, and which fell by 8% in real terms between 2010 and 2015. Research by Oxfam Ireland which was published in 2014 indicated that austerity measures were affecting Northern Ireland disproportionately due to its being one of the UK's most disadvantaged regions with a high dependence on public spending. In 2017 the Conservative–DUP agreement resulted in an additional £1 billion of public sector funding for Northern Ireland over two years, with the money focused on the health, infrastructure and education budgets.

== Reaction ==
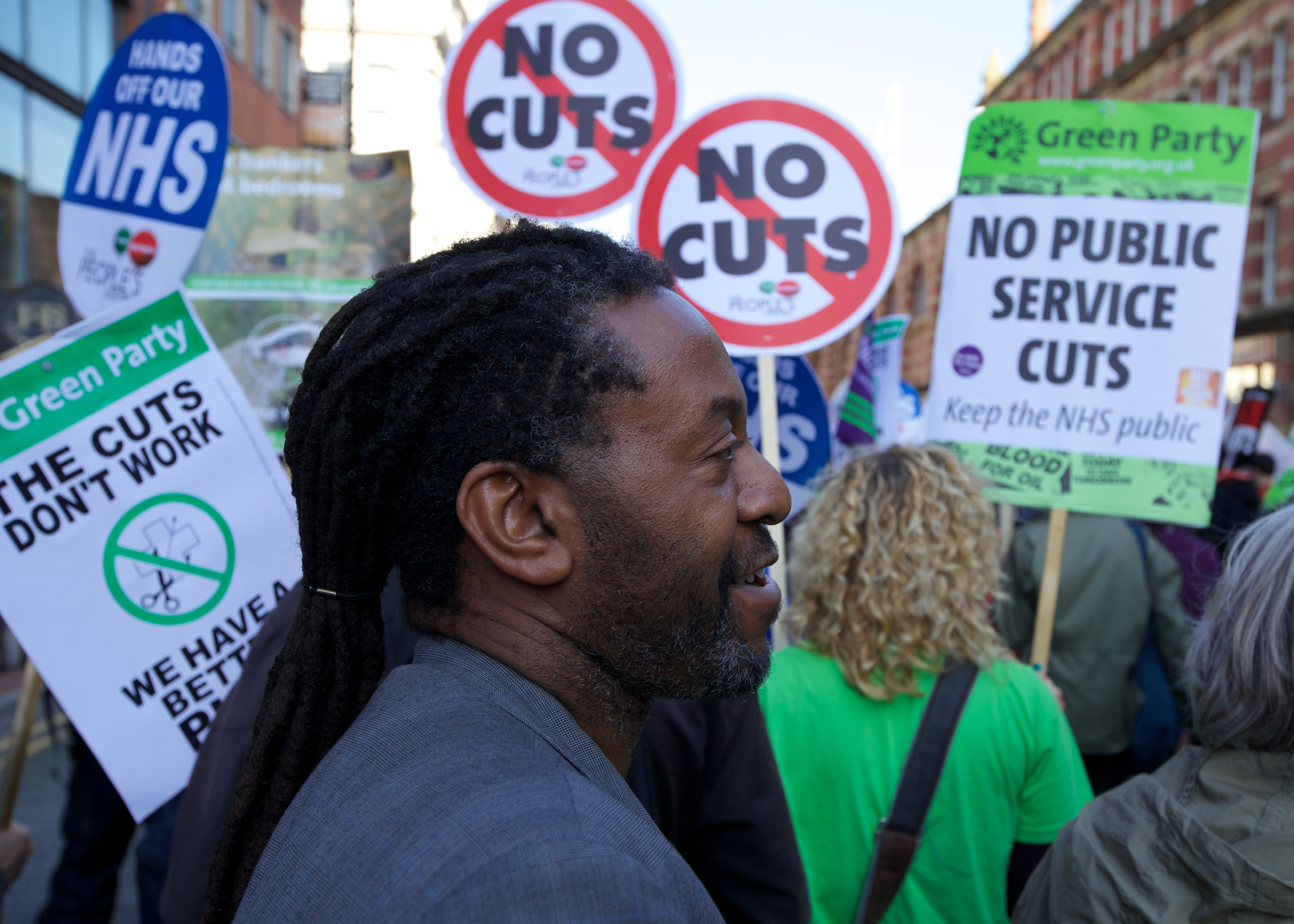
Green Party boards signalling opposition to cuts at the Save our NHS demonstration in Manchester in September 2013

During the early years of the austerity programme, many economists argued that the financial changes of the austerity programme should not be undertaken as extensively and as quickly as was done. Osborne, however, argued that without the implementation of the programme in the way that it was, another financial crisis was likely.

The rationale behind the need for achieving a balanced budget in the financial climate following the Great Recession has been questioned by some Keynesian economists. Andrew Gamble writing in Parliamentary Affairs in 2015 commented:

Most macroeconomists now agree that the austerity programme pursued by the Coalition Government in its first two years was both too severe and unnecessary and set back the economic recovery which was underway in the first half of 2010. The Office of Budget Responsibility confirmed that the austerity programme reduced GDP, while the Oxford economist Simon Wren-Lewis has calculated that the Coalition Government's austerity programme cost the average household £4000 over the lifetime of the Parliament and severely damaged those public services which were not ring-fenced.

Ha-Joon Chang, writing in 2017, observed that "in today's UK economy, whose underlying stagnation has been masked only by the release of excess liquidity on an oceanic scale, some deficit spending may be good – necessary, even". Some criticism has been based on allegations of economic opportunism, with the government said to have made politically popular cuts rather than those necessary to achieve its long-term aims. Paul Mac Flynn wrote for the Nevin Economic Research Institute in 2015 that:

Instead of focussing on the long-term structural causes of increases in public expenditure, the current government have adopted glib and uninformed targets for reductions in overall expenditure. Rather than tackling a housing crisis or low pay they have introduced measures like the benefit cap and the bedroom tax.

Ben Chu, economics editor of The Independent newspaper, commented that: "Austerity, as practiced by Osborne, was essentially a political choice rather than an economic necessity, and the human costs have been huge".

Economists Alberto Alesina, Carlo A. Favero and Francesco Giavazzi, writing in Finance & Development in 2018, argued that deficit reduction policies based on spending cuts typically have almost no effect on output, and hence form a better route to achieving a reduction in the debt-to-GDP ratio than raising taxes. The authors commented that the UK government austerity programme had resulted in growth that was higher than the European average and that the UK's economic performance had been much stronger than the International Monetary Fund had predicted.

The United Nations carried out an investigation in 2018 led by Philip Alston, the United Nations special rapporteur on extreme poverty and human rights, into the effect of austerity policies in the UK. Alston concluded that the austerity programme had breached UN human rights agreements relating to women, children, disabled people and economic and social rights. Alston's report described the programme as "entrenching high levels of poverty and inflicting unnecessary misery in one of the richest countries in the world".

=== Ring-fenced departments ===
Peter Dominiczak (political editor at The Daily Telegraph) wrote that because spending on the NHS and foreign aid is ring-fenced, "other Whitehall departments will face savage cuts to their budgets". However, some (such as Dr Louise Marshall in The Guardian) have questioned whether the National Health Service (NHS) really is exempt from austerity measures.

== Organised labour ==
Political scientist David Bailey argues that "While 'standard' national disputes led by mainstream trade unions were on the whole not sufficient to achieve success during this period, nevertheless a number of alternative combinations of conditions did prove to be sufficient, especially locally-focused campaigns, those undertaken by grassroots 'indie' unions and those in the transport sector".

== Public opinion ==
A YouGov poll in 2015 found that whilst 58% of those surveyed viewed austerity as "necessary", and 48% judged it to be good for economy (compared to 34% who thought it bad for the economy), 50% thought the programme was being carried out "unfairly".

The 2017 British Social Attitudes Survey found that 48% of those surveyed during the previous year wanted higher taxes to pay for more public spending, the first time since 2008 that more people wanted an increase in taxation and spending than opposed it, and the highest proportion to support such measures since 2004.

An April 2018 opinion poll by Number Cruncher Politics in the Financial Times found that 66% of British adults, including majorities of all major parties' supporters, thought austerity had "gone too far". A poll by Survation for the GMB trade union published in spring 2018 found that 62% of respondents wanted the 2018 spring budget to increase spending on public services in real terms, while 48% of those who had voted for the Conservative Party at the 2017 general election thought that austerity had been excessive.

== Effects on general elections ==
=== 2010 ===
The 2010 general election was contested by a Labour Party and a Conservative Party which had both committed themselves to austerity policies. Labour's then-Chancellor of the Exchequer Alistair Darling predicted that "two parliaments of pain" would be necessary to address the UK's budget deficit. The Institute for Fiscal Studies said that Labour's plans implied a cumulative decline of 11.9% in public spending over four years. This would reduce public expenditure by a total of £46 billion in inflation-adjusted terms, taking it from over 27% of the economy to below 21%, back to its level in the late-1990s. The IFS also said that there appeared to be only a modest difference between the plans put forward by the two main political parties. As predicted, neither party won a majority at that year's general election; resulting in the first hung parliament in 36 years, and the Conservative Party forming a coalition government with the centrist Liberal Democrats.

=== 2015 ===
At the end of the first full parliament under the austerity programme, Labour and the Conservatives were deadlocked in the polls. At the 2015 general election, the Conservatives modified their commitment to austerity with a series of unfunded spending promises, including £8 billion of additional expenditure for the NHS. At the same time, the 2015 Conservative Party general election manifesto proposed making sufficient reductions in public spending and welfare to eliminate the budget deficit entirely by 2018–19 and run a small budget surplus by 2020. The Labour manifesto proposed the less rigorous objective of reducing the budget deficit every year with the aim of seeing debt as a share of GDP falling by 2020 and achieving a budget surplus "as soon as possible". This would render the spending reductions proposed by the Conservatives unnecessary, according to some analyses. The Conservatives won the general election with an overall majority for the first time in 23 years, which was unexpected by most polls; as they had predicted another hung parliament. Political commentator Patrick Wintour argued that one of the reasons for Labour's loss was its lack of clarity on the cause of the budget deficit. Anti-austerity protests followed the election result, but post-election polling for an independent review conducted by Campaign Company for Labour MP Jon Cruddas indicated that voters in England and Wales did not support an anti-austerity platform, concluding: "the Tories did not win despite austerity, but because of it". Conservative figures speaking in retrospect have credited the win to the fact that austerity was strategically targeted, and avoided impacting demographic groups more likely to vote Conservative.

=== 2017 ===
The 2017 general election was held almost three years earlier than scheduled under the Fixed-term Parliaments Act 2011, in an attempt to increase the Government's majority to facilitate the Brexit process. The Conservative manifesto pledged to eliminate the deficit by the "middle of the next decade", an aim which the Institute for Fiscal Studies (IFS) said would "likely require more spending cuts or tax rises even beyond the end of the next parliament". Labour's manifesto proposed increasing the Treasury's income by £49 billion per year as a result of taxation rises and increasing public expenditure "to its highest sustained level in more than 30 years". The IFS said that Labour's proposals "could be expected to raise at most £40 billion" and that Labour was planning to maintain a majority of the cuts to working-age benefits proposed by the Conservatives. As a result of the election, the Conservatives lost their parliamentary majority, but remained in government as the largest single party in parliament. Gavin Barwell, Theresa May's Downing Street Chief of Staff, blamed anger over Brexit and austerity for the loss of seats. The Labour opposition announced a plan to challenge further austerity measures and vote against them in the House of Commons. A Labour spokesman said: "We will be using the changed parliamentary arithmetic to drive home the fact that the Tory programme for five more years of austerity will not go on as before."

=== 2019 ===
Ahead of the 2019 general election, Sajid Javid declared the end of austerity. The move was described as "grubby electioneering" by shadow chancellor John McDonnell.

=== 2024 ===
In the 2024 election, the term austerity was applied critically to both Labour and Conservative policies by other parties. Plaid Cymru described the Labour manifesto as "more austerity but painted red", while the SNP referred to it as offering "prolonged austerity". Labour ruled out a "return to austerity", and along with the Nuffield Trust described Conservative policies as austerity during the campaign. The Conservative defeat at the election was due to many factors but the legacy of austerity policies played a role.

== See also ==
- United Kingdom cost-of-living crisis
- Anti-austerity movement in the United Kingdom
- Austerity
- List of recessions in the United Kingdom
- Northern Powerhouse
- People's Assembly Against Austerity
- Premiership of David Cameron
- Public Sector Net Cash Requirement
- United Kingdom national debt
