= Workers' Socialist League =

- Chairperson: Alan Thornett
- Founded: 1974
- Dissolved: 1984
- Split from: Workers' Revolutionary Party (UK)
- Succeeded by: Socialist Organiser Alliance, Socialist Group
- Headquarters: London
- Newspaper: Socialist Press, Socialist Organiser
- Ideology: Trotskyism
- International affiliation: Trotskyist International Liaison Committee

The Workers Socialist League (WSL) was a Trotskyist group in Britain. The group was formed by Alan Thornett and other members of the Workers Revolutionary Party (WRP) after their expulsion from that group in 1974.

== Origins ==
Thornett and his comrades had questioned what they saw as a sectarian turn of the WRP. They argued that this turn would isolate the WRP and that it was necessary to turn back to Trotsky's Transitional Programme. They wrote a number of documents to argue their case and as a result were expelled. A minor controversy surrounded these documents when some WRP members alleged that Thornett was not their author, but that in fact they were written by members of the Bulletin Group, who were supporters of Pierre Lambert and therefore strongly opposed by the WRP.

The WSL was founded in 1974. The leadership was grouped around Thornett, Tony Richardson and John Lister. Terry Eagleton was a well-known member. Unlike the WRP, whose politics it inherited, it covered Irish politics, women's struggles and broke with the homophobia characteristic of Gerry Healy. The group also concluded that Cuba had been a deformed workers state since the revolution of 1959. It published the weekly paper Socialist Press and a number of issues of a theoretical journal Trotskyism Today.

In its first few years the WSL attempted to capitalise on its existing base in industry and expand outwards from its base in Oxford. Despite having more realistic perspectives than the WRP, it was never able to group more than 150 members. Many people who left the WRP simply left revolutionary politics, and as the level of industrial struggle slackened in the late 1970s the WSL lost members and internal factional struggles began.

The first factional struggles were the result of the development of a small group of supporters of the American Spartacist League. Spartacist London had been founded in 1975 by American, Canadian and Australian Spartacists with the intention of engaging other Trotskyist groups in debate. As both they and the WSL have a common past in the International Committee of the Fourth International they paid great attention to the WSL. The result was that they recruited a number of WSL members to their views and these formed the Leninist Faction in 1977. The Leninist Faction would split to join the London Spartacists in forming the Spartacist League in 1978. This factional struggle had its sequel in 1979 when another group of WSL members were similarly won to the Spartacists this time calling themselves the Trotskyist Faction.

In 1978 the United Secretariat of the Fourth International invited the WSL to submit material to the USec's 1979 Eleventh World Congress. It did so in July 1978 with The Poisoned Well, a critical analysis of the development of USec which was republished in Trotskyism Today.

Meanwhile, 1979 saw the election of a Conservative Government and the beginnings of a major offensive against the trade unions. This also had a reaction in the Labour Party which swung to the left and began to attract the attention of Trotskyist groups including the WSL.

== Failed Fusion ==
By 1980 the WSL was essentially working within the Labour Party which caused a degree of internal differentiation within its membership as to how to relate to the Labour Left around Tony Benn, which they saw as reformist. The presence of another Trotskyist group in the Labour Party, the International-Communist League, also posed problems and the possibility of the two groups merging was raised.

Those members of the WSL most opposed to any fusion of the group with the I-CL tended to be those involved with the group's "open" work around unemployment which was then a massive question in Britain. The WSL launched a short-lived National Unemployed Workers Movement at this time which despite its name was actually more concerned with unemployed youth than workers thrown out of the factories. The fusion of the two groups was achieved in July 1981 with the fused group maintaining the name Workers Socialist League, often called the 'new' WSL, with Socialist Organiser as its paper (although theoretically SO was a "broad" paper and not that of the WSL or I-CL before it). The WSL remained affiliated to the Trotskyist International Liaison Committee, a small international tendency of groups led by the WSL. Its other affiliates were to be found in Denmark, Italy, Greece, the US and among Turkish exiles. The only group affiliated which supported the former I-CL was to be found in Australia.

Within the new WSL disputes broke out immediately. Although there were many issues involved in the internal debates the Falklands War was paramount. Traditionally, Trotskyists defend countries oppressed by imperialism in any military conflict, calling this military support which is differentiated from political support. The reaction from some Trotskyists in Britain was to give such support to Argentina when war broke out, ignoring historical claims to the islands or the question of who began the war. The I-CL disagreed with this view and took a dual defeatist position on the war on the grounds that Argentina was not a semi-colony of imperialism, and also called for self determination for the Falkland Islanders. This position caused disputes within the group, mostly with members of the old WSL.

By the summer of 1982 clear but informal factional lines had developed in the WSL. One group was the former I-CL around Sean Matgamna, a second around Alan Clinton and a smaller third group was composed of part of the old WSL. Most of the parties in the TILC supported the third group, which in January 1983 constituted itself as the Internationalist Tendency (IT). The small IT group came to disagree with both the other groups on many important issues, including the Labour Party, Northern Ireland and the Israeli–Palestinian conflict. The IT had 38 members most from the old WSL but including I-CLers with its main support in Leicester and Nottingham. It was led by Mike Jones and Pete Flack.

In March 1983 the IT declared that it was now a faction, thus becoming the Internationalist Faction (IF), and it adopted a number of documents in which their criticisms of the leadership was stepped up. But there were by now tensions in the IF as some members became sympathetic to Workers Power and left to join that group. Others sympathised with the international tendency around the Workers' Party (Argentina), the Latin American Tendencia Cuarta Internacional (TCI). The next stage in the developing split was the April 1983 TILC meeting at which the WSL delegates voted to prevent Chilean sympathisers from affiliating to the TILC. The WSL then walked out after a resolution calling on Alan Thornett to fight Sean Matgamna's "revisionism". The IF, who sympathised with the TILC, were then expelled from the WSL, and formed the Workers Internationalist League.

The WSL was a little smaller after the expulsion of the IF and still split between the supporters of Sean Matgamna and Alan Thornett. Thornett's supporters stopped paying subscriptions to the group and called several special conferences. Later, in 1984, Matgamna's supporters formally expelled Thornett's supporters.

== Socialist Group ==
Matgamna's supporters continued with the WSL and Socialist Organiser but soon dropped the name WSL in favour of Socialist Organiser Alliance, while Thornett's depleted followers founded a new smaller group called the Socialist Group, which was to publish a magazine called Socialist Viewpoint until it fused with the International Group in 1987, to form the International Socialist Group.
