= Glastonbury Festival 1987 =

Music festival in England

- Locations: Worthy Farm, Pilton, Somerset, England
- Previous event: Glastonbury Festival 1986
- Next event: Glastonbury Festival 1989

Glastonbury CND Festival 1987 tickets cost £21 and 60,000 attended.

The local council had initially declined the farm a licence. The decision was overturned in court the month before. 1987 saw the introduction of the Womad stage to the Festival. The 1987 line-up included Elvis Costello, Robert Cray, New Order, Paul Brady, Michelle Shocked and Van Morrison.

During the early 1980s Michael Eavis was involved in establishing a local branch of the Campaign for Nuclear Disarmament (CND), and subsequently agreed to make the Glastonbury Festival a fundraiser for CND, as it was from 1981 to 1987. In £130,000 was raised for CND and local charities.

== Pyramid stage ==
Friday	Saturday	Sunday
New Order; Julian Cope; Robert Cray; Ben E. King; Hüsker Dü; The Mighty Lemon Drops; World Party	Elvis Costello And The Attractions; Los Lobos; Richard Thompson; The Woodentops; Paul Brady; That Petrol Emotion; Rodney Allen	Taj Mahal; Van Morrison; The Communards; Courtney Pine; Trouble Funk; Michelle Shocked; The Proclaimers

== Stage Two ==
Friday	Saturday	Sunday
El Sonido De Londres; The Smithereens; Robyn Hitchcock & The Egyptians; The Soup Dragons; The Oyster Band; Michelle Shocked; Andy Sheppard Quartet; Eduardo Niebla & Antonio Forcione; The Chesterfields; Rodney Allen; Automatic Dlamini	Misty In Roots; The Weather Prophets; The Triffids; The Chills; Green On Red; Real Sounds of Africa; The Blue Aeroplanes; The Jazz Defektors	Doctor and the Medics; Felt; Barrence Whitfield & the Savages; The Mekons; Gaye Bykers on Acid; Stump; Pop Will Eat Itself; The Brilliant Corners; The Tommy Chase Quartet; Head
