= Solidarity (newspaper) =

Cover of Solidarity

Solidarity is a socialist newspaper published by the Alliance for Workers' Liberty (AWL).

The paper was founded as a monthly in the mid-1990s, as Action for Health and Welfare, by the Welfare State Network (WSN), a campaign supported by the AWL, the International Socialist Group and others.

The paper became identified with the AWL after its name was changed to Action for Solidarity and it went fortnightly. The name was subsequently shortened to Solidarity. It is currently a weekly paper edited by Martin Thomas.
