= League for Socialist Action (UK) =

- Abbreviation: LSA
- Founded: 1976
- Dissolved: 1982
- Split from: International Marxist Group
- Merged into: International Socialist Group
- Headquarters: London
- Ideology: Trotskyism
- Political position: Far-left
- European affiliation: None
- European Parliament group: None
- International affiliation: None

The League for Socialist Action was a small Trotskyist organisation in Britain.

It consisted of a group of members who split from the International Marxist Group in 1976 in support of the US Socialist Workers Party's tendency in the Fourth International.

Its publication, Socialist Action, was produced several times each year. Its pamphlets included Abortion a Woman's Right! (1975); The Labour Party (1976); and Revolution in the Americas (1981).

It engaged in entrism in the Labour Party after 1976, and merged with the International Marxist Group in 1982.
