= No Sweat (organisation) =

No Sweat is a broad-based not-for-profit organisation with HQ in London's Kings Cross, England, which fights for the well-being and protection of sweatshop labourers, not only in developing countries but also in Britain.

== History ==
Working with the GMB Union in London's East End, in the London Borough of Tower Hamlets in 2005, the organisation infiltrated and exposed sweatshops operating for Topshop and reported those involved to the authorities. No Sweat encourages consumers to choose ethically sourced clothing, whilst firmly rejecting boycotts which only lead to factories being moved further from the limelight, further increasing the dangers to those trapped in the cycle of wage slavery.

== Partners ==
The organisation works variously with parts of the TUC and other trade union organisations, the National Garment Workers Federation and closely cooperates with the Ethical Threads clothing company in Britain. It is also aligned with other campaign groups like Labour Behind the Label, and with "No Sweat Apparel" in the United States. Independent of political influence, the group seeks to reach out to all parts of the global community to help stamp out sweatshop labour fullstop - often dealing directly with groups of workers that would normally have no voice and no support outside their immediate community - for example Batay Ouvriye in Haiti and individuals like jailed union official Ali Nejati in Iran.

== Events ==
They hold numerous events in London, Sheffield, Glasgow, Brighton and elsewhere around the United Kingdom, and have a presence at many events such as Glastonbury Festival's Leftfield and many smaller counter-culture festivals and gigs.

Recently the organisation has been running a successful comedy night on the 2nd Thursday of each month in London's Cross Kings basement rooms, guest acts have included Mark Thomas, Josie Long, Rob Newman, Robin Ince and Simon Munnery as well as live podcasts from established acts such as Richard Herring and Andrew Collins and legendary punk filmmaker Don Letts.

These events all aim to publicise the plight of sweatshop workers (children and adults) around the world as well as giving a platform to other, less prominent groups where appropriate and have developed a reputation as the last bastion of genuine counter culture in the now hyper-developed Kings Cross area.

=== Fashion parade ===
In April 2009 the BBC news and Times newspapers covered a No Sweat fashion parade outside Primark's flagship Oxford St store - an event organised in response to recent outcry over the company's atrocious labour policies and relationships with subsidiary contractors who make regular use of child labour, as highlighted by the BBC's in 2006.

== Goals ==
The group's activities are primarily two-fold, firstly to organise direct action campaigns to pressure the big brand companies that exploit people through sweatshop labour, secondly to work with independent organisations around the globe to support vulnerable people and help them to unite together and stand up to their employers, demanding safe working conditions, decent hours and a living wage as well as independent trade union rights to protect them from malicious attacks and extreme exploitation.

They are volunteer-run, and anyone can get involved.

== Gallery ==
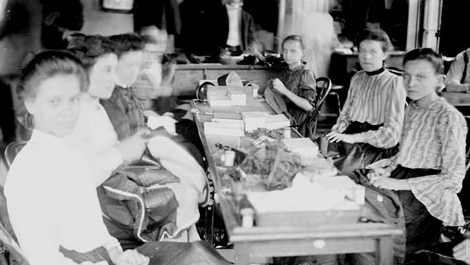
Sweatshop inspection in Chicago, Illinois, 1903

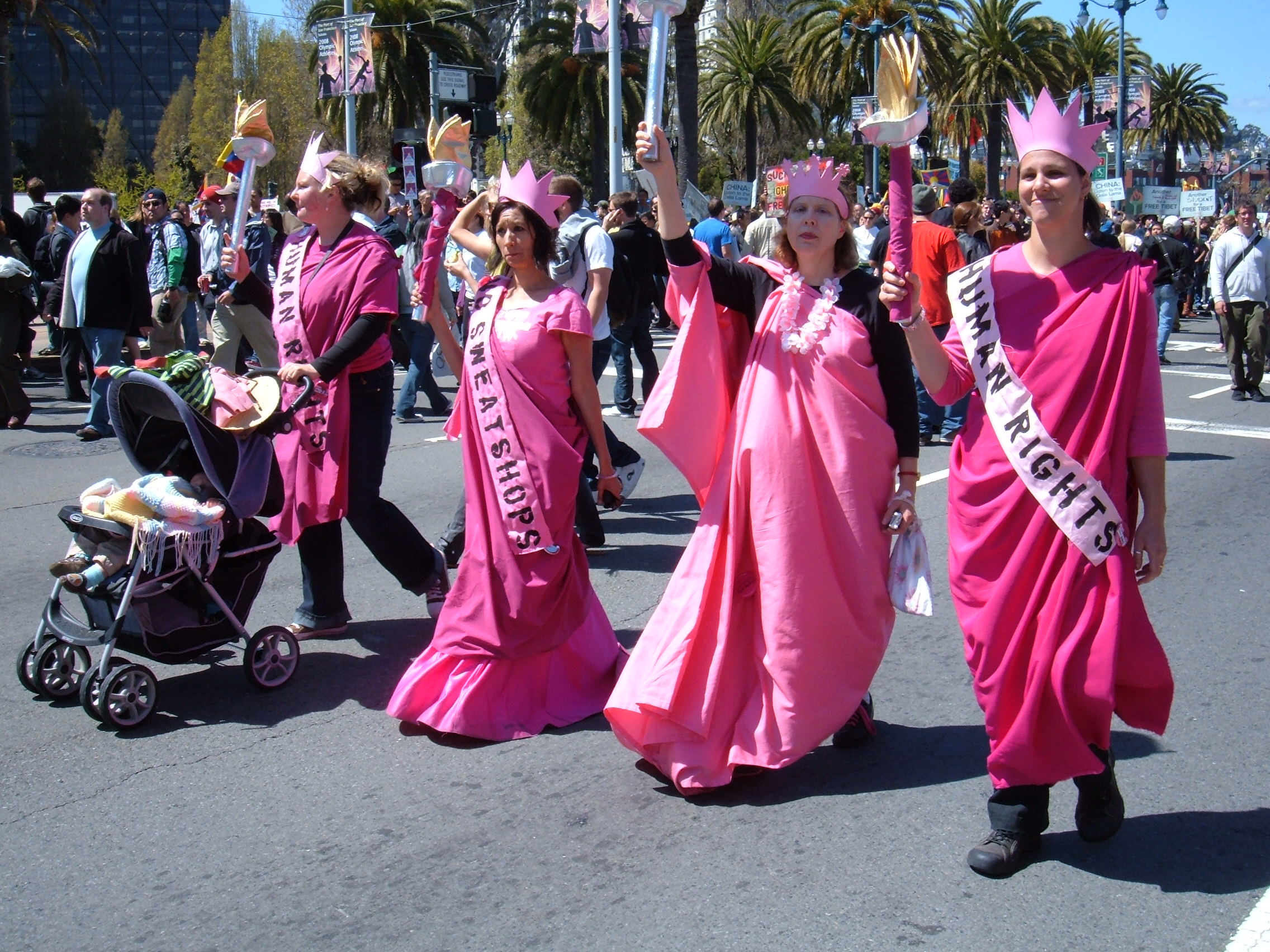
Women protesting sweatshops, The Embarcadero, San Francisco, 2008.

== See also ==
- International Labor Rights Fund
- National Labor Committee
- Sweatshop
