= Betty Hamilton =

British Trotskyist

Betty Hamilton (1904–1994) was a British Trotskyist.

Born Berthe Dutoit in the Vaud area of French Switzerland, the daughter of a socialist engineer, Hamilton moved to Paris as a young woman. There, she worked as a fashion journalist and, in the left-wing ferment of the early 1930s, became associated with the early Trotskyist movement and with others such as the Greek archaeo-Marxists. She moved to London in the 1930s, working as a dance teacher and moving in radical art and music circles, then as an industrial worker during the war when she was also the secretary of Newark Labour Party. Maintaining her links with Trotskyists in Paris (including Pierre Frank) she had a key role in linking British and French Trotskyists during and just after the Second World War. During the war she sheltered emigres from Europe in London. Later she ran her own business importing industrial diamonds which enabled her to help finance the Healy wing of the British Trotskyists.

From Hamilton's arrival in England, she was a member of various Trotskyist groupings, including the early Militant Group, the Workers' International League and the Revolutionary Communist Party (RCP).

Hamilton joined Gerry Healy's split from the RCP, which became The Club and later the Socialist Labour League (SLL). The SLL was part of the International Committee of the Fourth International (ICFI). Hamilton was for many years closely linked with Gerry Healy but, in 1971, she sided with Pierre Lambert and the French OCI Internationalist Communist Organisation when the ICFI split into two, ostensibly over the place of philosophy in Marxist theory, but equally about control of the ICFI after the OCI grew to be larger than the SLL in the late 1960s. She remained a formal but dissident member of the SLL until the formation of the Bulletin Group in 1974-5. She took public stands as a Trotskyist, condemning Healy's allegations that Joseph Hansen, one of the American Socialist Workers Party leaders, was a CIA agent.

Hamilton co-founded the British Committee for the Reconstruction of the Fourth International (BCRFI) after disagreements with Robin Blick and John Archer within the Bulletin Group, which then split. She later joined the Socialist Labour Group when the two sections of the original Bulletin Group joined together again in 1980. She maintained an active membership of the Labour Party for most of her life in Britain, in North London, in Newark during the war and, from the 1940s until old age, in Westminster.

Betty had her son Jacques (1927) in Paris and her daughter Lorna in 1930.
