= The Experimental Pop Band =

British indie pop group

- Origin: Bristol, England
- Genres: Indie pop
- Years active: Mid-1990s–present
- Labels: Swarffinger; Cup of Tea; City Slang; Cooking Vinyl
- Members: Davey Woodward; Joe Rooney; Phil Willmott; Keith Bailey
- Past members: Chris Galvin; Corin Dingley; Mark Barber

The Experimental Pop Band are an English indie pop group, led by former singer with The Brilliant Corners, Davey Woodward.

== History ==
The band was formed in mid-1990, initially as a studio project under the name The South West Experimental Pop Band, by former Brilliant Corners members Davey Woodward and Chris Galvin, along with third member Corin Dingley. The band's first two releases were the EPs The Lounge and Boutique in my Backyard, the latter named 'Single of the week' by Melody Maker, with the lead track later covered by Theaudience. Tracks from these and the "Skinny" single were compiled together on the Woof album in January 1997, with the band's debut album proper, Discgrotesque, released in June that year. Corrine left to join Alpha, with Joe Rooney (keyboards) and Keith Bailey (drums) added to the line-up, and the band recorded a session for John Peel's BBC Radio 1 show in February 1997. A further EP was issued in 1998 before Galvin's death after a long battle with cancer on 22 December 1998, aged 39. Material released prior to his death was released in January 1999 on the "Frozen Head" single, and on the Homesick album later that year.

After a two-year break, Woodward, Rooney and Bailey returned in 2001 and recruited new bassist Mark Barber, the band now signed to City Slang. The Tracksuit Trilogy was released in 2001, produced by John Parish, and given a four-star review by the Sunday Herald. Further albums followed with Tarmac & Flames (2004) and Tinsel Stars (2007). Barber had been replaced by Phil Wilmott by 2004. The band played on the new bands stage at Glastonbury in 2004.

The band released a further album Tinsel Stars in 2007 with limited sales, although successful European tours followed.

In 2010, Keith Bailey (drums) left the band and was replaced by Mark Bradley.

== Discography ==
=== Albums ===
- Woof (1997), Swarffinger
- Discgrotesque (1997), Swarffinger
- Homesick (1999), City Slang
- The Tracksuit Trilogy (2001), City Slang
- Tarmac & Flames (2004), Cooking Vinyl
- Tinsel Stars (2007), Triumphant Sound
- Vertigo (2012), Wear It Well (Cargo Records)

=== EPs ===
- The Lounge (1996), Swarffinger
- Boutique in my Backyard (1996), Swarffinger
- Forty Greatest Hits (1998), Cup of Tea

=== Singles ===
- "Skinny" (1995), Swarffinger
- "Frozen Head" (1999), Cup of Tea
- "Punk Rock Classic" (1999), City Slang
- "Bang Bang You're Dead" (2001), City Slang
- "Hard Enough" (2001), City Slang
- "Glowing in the Dark" (2005), Neutone
- "Little Things" (2012) Wearitwell
