= Terry and Gerry =

British pop band

- Origin: Birmingham, England
- Genres: Pop
- Years active: 1980s-present
- Members: Terry Lilley; Gerry Colvin
- Website: terryandgerry.com

Terry and Gerry are a British pop band, originally formed in the early 1980s by Terry Lilley and Gerry Colvin in Birmingham, England. Unusually for the time the band was based on a skiffle sound, making use of a washboard for percussion instead of a drum kit. Terry Lilley plays double bass, and Gerry Colvin sings lead vocals and plays acoustic guitar.

== History ==
Gerry Colvin had studied American Studies at university and worked for an American bank before turning to music. Americana and comment on American politics and culture were to feature strongly in some of the band's songs ("Kennedy Says", "Reservation", "A Thousand Towns", "Pizza Pie and Junk"). Terry Lilley had previously been a member of punk band Dennis & the Din Makers and later of Vision Collision.

Terry and Gerry took their style from 1950's pop artists – they wore black evening suits and ribbon ties in the style of the Everly Brothers while sounding more akin to Britain's Lonnie Donegan. The songs written by Colvin/Lilley were remarkable for their brevity with the three songs on the first side of their debut EP Butter's on the Bread totalling just four minutes and five seconds. Butter's on the Bread referred to the miners' strike of 1984.

Butter's on the Bread appeared on Robert Lloyd's Vindaloo records but subsequent records were released on the in Tape record label run by Marc Riley (ex The Fall).

BBC disc jockey and Donegan fan John Peel promoted the band when apparently by chance he picked out their demonstration tape because his wife's best friends were also known as Terry and Gerry. He thought the coincidence was too great to ignore. The band recorded three sessions for the John Peel programme.

Their second and most successful release "Clothes Shop" was reviewed by Morrissey on BBC Radio who declared "I like it – don't know why". It reached number 5 in the UK Indie Chart.

The band's third release "Banking on Simon" was used in abridged form as the theme to the ITV children's television music-themed quiz game Poparound, which was produced by Central Independent Television and ran for two series between 1985 and 1986. Terry and Gerry appeared on one edition of the programme to perform the song (with "Doreen" playing washboard). Despite the use of the A-side as a children's TV theme the B-side featured a song about a young man named Joey tragically addicted to illegal drugs. At the time the name Joey had a particular stigma attached to it after children cruelly used it to abuse others in reference to Joey Deacon a man with cerebral palsy who had appeared on BBC children's TV show Blue Peter. Another theme was recorded for the Newshound show but not released on record.

Terry and Gerry's only LP record From Lubbock to Clintwood East is a reference to Buddy Holly's hometown Lubbock, Texas and a fictitious suburb that is a play on the name of the actor Clint Eastwood.

"Reservation", a comment on European treatment of indigenous Americans also serves as a comment on UK housing policy. It was backed by "Pizza Pie and Junk" a tale from the point of view of a British person saving up to fly to America on Freddie Laker's or Richard Branson's cut-price airlines and what they might find.

"Last Bullet in the Gun" is an uncharacteristically slow-paced song that offered no hope or joy and which describes a suicide. It was to be the band's last single and it reached No. 1 in the indie charts.

== After Terry and Gerry ==
In 1986 Gerry Colvin worked with other musicians as The Man Upstairs co-writing "Consumer Song", "Country Boy" and "I Bet They're Really Missing Me Downstairs" on the collectable The Consumers' EP.

Gerry Colvin collaborated with singer-songwriter Alison Moyet on the song "Find Me" which appears on her 1991 album Hoodoo. He went on to front two bands, Gerry Colvin's Inexperience and The Atlantics, both of which were popular live acts. Colvin subsequently performed and recorded with Nick Quarmby, Martin Fitzgibbon, Allen Maslen and Marion Fleetwood as ColvinQuarmby.

Terry Lilley studied for and achieved a higher national diploma in jazz studies; the only double-bass player to do so.

Jeremy Paige formed Rumblefish releasing an album on East West Records in 1992 and then Low Art Thrill releasing an album on Island Records in 1996, both with various supporting singles.

Mick Howson joined the Destroyers, a 15-piece gypsy band playing hurdygurdy.

In 2007 Cherry Red Records issued a retrospective collection of studio and live recordings

In 2014 autumn dates were advertised for Terry and Gerry performing as part of a John Peel Commemorative tour. During this tour, the band sold a new 6 track recording called "Dear John EP". In April 2015 Terry and Gerry were the special guests of Status Quo on the "Aquostic – Live" tour culminating with a performance at the Royal Albert Hall.

== Band members ==
- Terry Lilley – double bass and singing
- Gerry Colvin – guitar and singing
- Su Richardson (aka, Su Sonic, Doreen Deville) – washboard and singing
- Andy Downer – guitar and singing
- Jeremy Paige replaced Andy Downer for 'Reservation'
- Mick Howson ex Ricky Cool and the Icebergs founder member replaced Jeremy Paige for 'Last Bullet in the Gun'

== Discography ==
- Butter's on the Bread EP: (Vindaloo Records UGH7) 7-inch

Side 1:Hello

- 1. Butter's on the Bread
- 2. T.V. Song

Side A.

- 1. Dennis & Brian
- 2. Wait Until You're Older

Clothes Shop/ Kennedy Says (In Tape Records IT 014) released 2/3/85 12-Inch EP (IT 018) includes Butter's on the Bread, Dennis and Brian, Wait Until You're Older (Live)

Banking on Simon/ Joey (In Tape Records 019) released 10/8/85 12-Inch includes The Good, The Bad and the Usherette and Wolfman's Request

From Lubbock To Clintwood East LP: (In Tape Records Twenty-Two) released 7/12/85

Side 1: Hello/ Joey/ Ballad of a Nasty Man/ C.A.R.S/ A Thousand Towns/ Percy Crusoe/ The Good, the Bad and the Usherette/ Side 2: Fashion Rodeo/ The Armchair Terrorist's Song/ How Long Johnny?/ Reservation/ A Sea Shanty for the Gravy Boat/ Hello (Slow version)/ Oscar's Theme

The cassette version of the album adds Wolfman's Request, Kennedy Says and Clothes Shop to side 1.

Reservation/ Pizza Pie & Junk (In Tape Records IT 027), released 19/4/86 Nb the single version of 'Reservation' differs from the LP version.

The Last Bullet in the Gun/ Victory Polka/ Independents' Day/ Joey (ITTI 036) released 6/9/86

Let's Get The Hell Back To Lubbock (Cherry Red Records cdmred315) released 23/4/07 is a comprehensive CD compilation of Terry & Gerry studio recordings with some additional live tracks.

Dear John EP (no label) released October 2014. Track listing: The Cossacks of Cadbury Road/ This Town Will/ Johnny Who?/ Fate Unknown/ Down on Animal Farm/ Bias Binding (original version which previously appeared on Yeah Yeah Noh's Prick Up Your Ears EP in 1985)

== Sources ==
- Sleeve notes
