= Workers Beer Company =

Beer company

- Thirst Among Equals

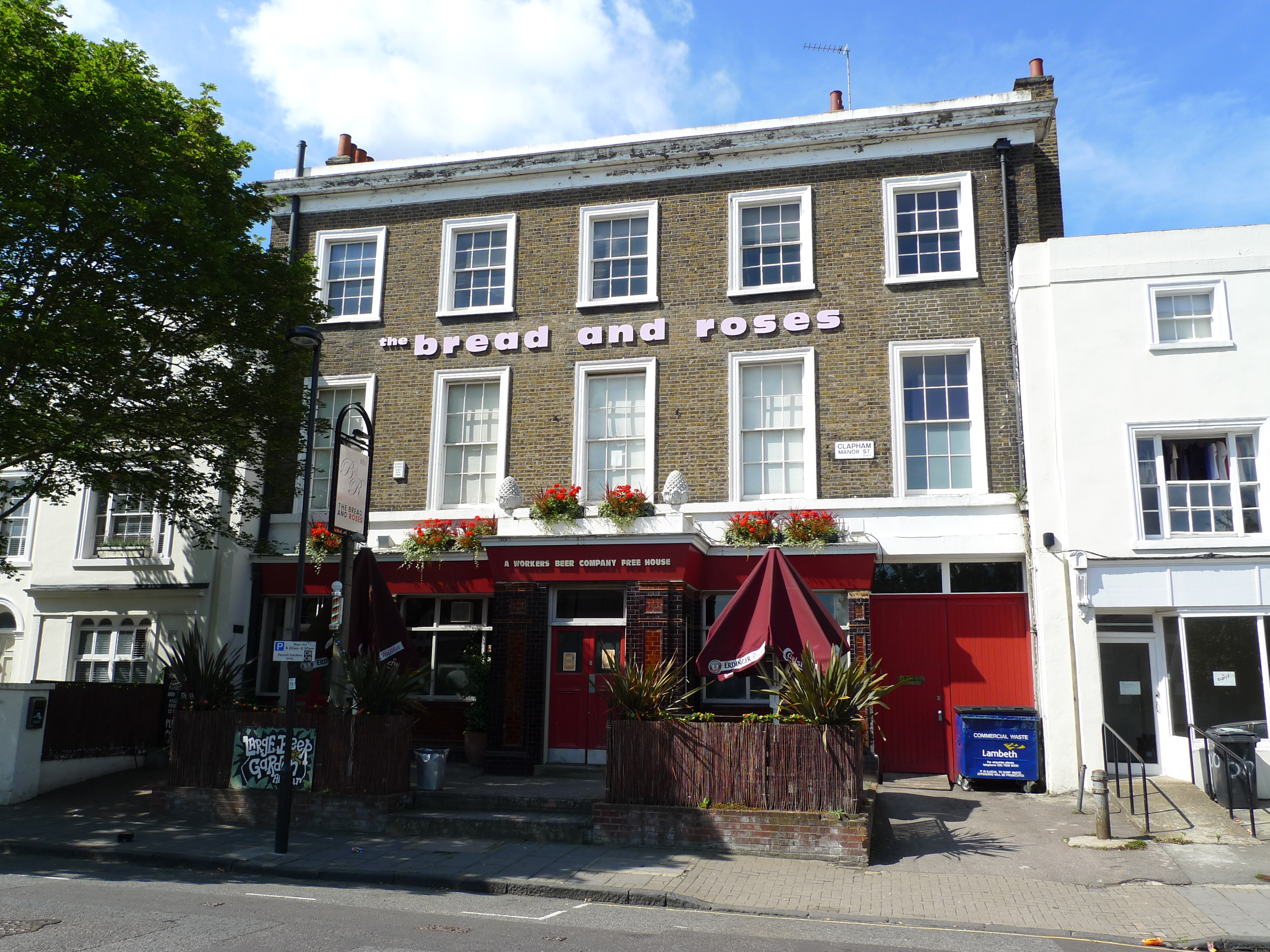
- Bread and Roses public house
- Abbreviation: WBC
- Established: 1986; 40 years ago
- Headquarters: 68a Clapham Manor Street; Clapham London SW4 6DZ
- Region served: UK & Ireland
- Services: Entertainment services
- Parent organization: BWTUC
- Subsidiaries: Bread and Roses public house
- Website: www.workersbeer.co.uk

The Workers Beer Company (WBC) is a trading arm of the Battersea and Wandsworth Trade Union Council (BWTUC) and is a British-Irish business that provides mass catering to bars at music festivals in the UK and Ireland. The WBC was set up by and is owned by the BWTUC.

== Operations ==
WBC bars are staffed by volunteers and the money they earn is paid directly to the Labour Movement Organisations that send them along and vouch for and take responsibility for their honesty and reliability. The most notable festivals that WBC have worked at include Glastonbury Festival, Reading and Leeds Festivals, Latitude Festival, Tolpuddle Festival, Homelands, Festival Internacional de Benicàssim and Womad, as well as smaller concerts and meetings. In 2013 WBC expanded its business into Ireland working for MCD and Festival Republic at Slane, Longitude, Phoenix Park, and in recent times provided Information Stewards at Oxegen as well as cup recycling.

The company also runs a permanent public house, the Bread and Roses, in Clapham, London.

WBC and the trade union GMB set up an ethical clothing company called Ethical Threads that provides mainly promotional T-shirts and sweatshirts, which is now a sponsor of the football club Reading Town F.C.

== Controversy ==
In June 2018, Festival Republic organised three day events at Finsbury Park with bars managed by the Workers Beer Company. However they faced a massive Twitter backlash after fans complained about having to queue for up to two hours to get a drink in soaring temperatures. Queues plagued most of the event leading some fans to leave the early. The Company later issued an apology blaming an "unprecedented failure of up to 40% of staff to turn up".
