= Battersea and Wandsworth TUC =

Battersea and Wandsworth TUC is a Trades Union Council (also known as a Trades Council) covering the London Borough of Wandsworth in South West London. It is one of the best organised and resourced TUCs in the UK thanks to its trading arm BWTUC (Trading) Ltd which runs the Workers Beer Company and a range of other commercial enterprises to raise money in an ethical way that can then be spent on the activities of the BWTUC.

The Trades Union Council owns an organising centre in Earlsfield and employs 3 full-time staff. Its organising and campaigning priorities are determined by the TUC's General Council (composed of delegates from over 50 affiliated Trade Union Branches) and executive committee, elected annually by those delegates. Currently BWTUC is engaged in campaigns to recruit and organise for trade unions like the GMB and UNISON throughout South West London and is also working with organisations like The Fairtrade Foundation and Banana Link.
