= Alan Thornett =

British Trotskyist activist and auto worker (1937–2026)

- Born: 15 June 1937
- Died: 9 October 2026 (aged 89)
- Political party: Communist Party of Great Britain; Workers Revolutionary Party; Workers Socialist League; International Socialist Group; Socialist Resistance; Respect Coalition; Anticapitalist Resistance

Alan Thornett (15 June 1937 – 9 October 2026) was a British Trotskyist activist.

== Life and career ==
Alan Thornett began his career as a car worker in Plant Oxford, Cowley, Oxford in 1959. He joined the Communist Party of Great Britain there in 1960 before being recruited with other shop stewards to Gerry Healy's then Socialist Labour League in 1966. However, in 1974 he and most of the Cowley group were expelled – from what had become the Workers Revolutionary Party the previous year – with around 200 other members. Around a hundred of them went on to form the Workers Socialist League (WSL) of which Thornett was a leader. It established an international tendency, the Trotskyist International Liaison Committee, and fused with the International-Communist League in 1981. Political differences emerged in the new organisation with parts of the ex-WSL splitting off before those remaining were expelled in 1984.

Thornett and his comrades regrouped as the Socialist Group and then fused with the International Group to form the International Socialist Group (ISG) in 1987; the ISG dissolved into Socialist Resistance in 2009. Thornett was a leader of the Fourth International.

He successfully argued for the ISG to exit the Labour Party and join the Socialist Alliance. Later, he supported the Alliance's dissolution in favour of the Respect Coalition. In the 2007 split in Respect, the ISG sided with the Respect Renewal faction around George Galloway against the SWP. Thornett sat on Respect's National Council until Socialist Resistance left Respect in 2010.

Thornett was the author of three volumes of autobiography: From Militancy to Marxism, Inside Cowley and Militant Years, and of Facing the Apocalypse – Arguments for Ecosocialism.

Thornett died on 9 October 2026, aged 89.
