= Socialist Campaign for a Labour Victory =

The Socialist Campaign for a Labour Victory (SCLV) was originally formed in 1978 by left-wing members of the British Labour Party, including those associated with the Trotskyist group Workers' Fight and the publications London Labour Briefing and Chartist to argue from a socialist perspective for the re-election of Labour despite the party's failures and policies in power since 1974.

The SCLV launched the newspaper Socialist Organiser and produced its own campaigning materials that local Constituency Labour Parties could use instead of official posters and leaflets. In the event, Margaret Thatcher won the 1979 general election for the Conservative Party.

36 years later, the SCLV was refounded in the run-up to the 2015 general election.

The campaign says its members do not "just want to “hold their noses” and just vote Labour as a lesser evil." They want to "combine campaigning for a Labour government with clear working-class demands, to boost working-class confidence, and strengthen and transform the labour movement".

Prominent supporters include the Labour MP John McDonnell, journalist and author David Osler, and a large number of labour movement activists and elected representatives.

== See also ==
- Socialist societies
- Affiliated trade unions
- Labour Representation Committee (2004)
