= Sean Matgamna =

Irish Trotskyist

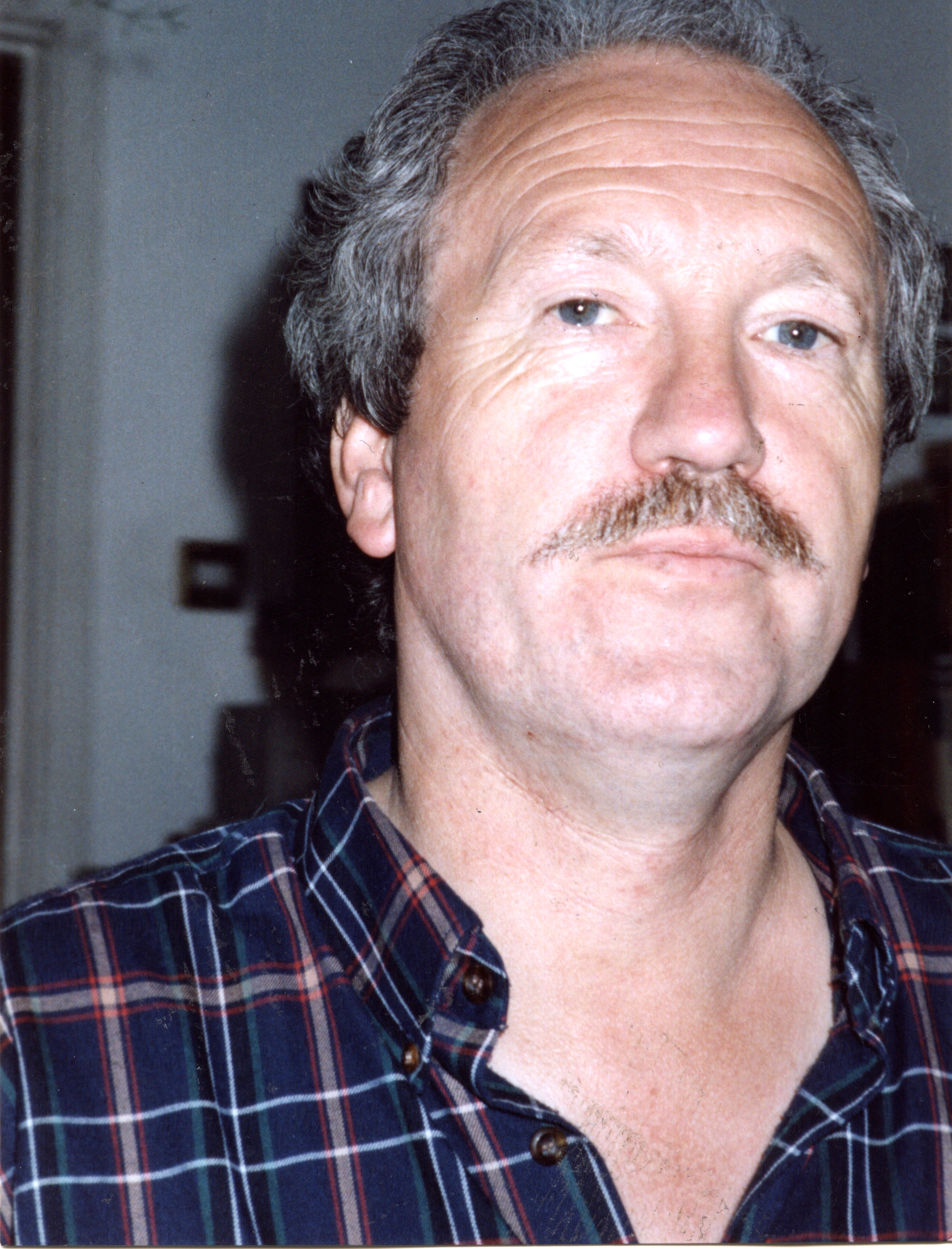
Sean Matgamna

Sean Matgamna (born 1941) is an Irish Trotskyist active in Britain. A founder of Workers' Fight in 1966, he is currently a member of the group, now called the Alliance for Workers' Liberty.

== Early life ==
Matgamna was born in 1941 in Ennis, County Clare, Ireland, and grew up in the town, serving as an altar boy at Ennis Cathedral. He emigrated with his family to Manchester in 1954 and attended St Peter's Catholic School in Salford.

== Early political experience ==
He joined the Young Communist League (YCL) as a teenager in Manchester and then, in 1960, Gerry Healy's Trotskyist Socialist Labour League, from which he was expelled in 1963. He joined another Trotskyist group, Militant, in 1965 and 1966 co-authored a pamphlet, What We Are and What We Must Become outlining his views. When Militant refused to circulate it among the membership, he and his supporters left the organisation.

== Workers' Fight ==
Matgamna, working with two supporters, formed the Workers' Fight group to act upon their views, central to which was a call for Trotskyist unity in Britain. They began publishing the journal Workers' Republic for the Irish Workers' Group and a handful of others joined the group before, in 1968, the International Socialists (later the Socialist Workers Party) also put out a call for unity. Responding to it, Workers' Fight joined the IS as the Trotskyist Tendency. With other dockers in Salford, he produced an industrial bulletin, The Hook.

Around this time Matgamna, who believed that effective working class rule then existed in some Catholic-majority areas of Northern Ireland, proposed that in the probable event of attacks on this control, that those areas should secede to the Irish Republic as a way of making Northern Ireland ungovernable and forcing open the national question in Ireland. He had already argued for the Protestant (overwhelmingly Unionist) areas having political autonomy within a united Ireland. Some commentators have argued that both of these positions are in fact calls for repartition although Matgamna and his supporters have always denied this.

At the end of 1971, the Trotskyist Tendency was expelled by IS and re-formed as Workers' Fight with a much increased membership. Martin Thomas, who had joined earlier in 1971, worked with Matgamna to take prominent roles in the group, alongside Rachel Lever, Phil Semp, Andrew Hornung, Stephen Corbishley, Pat Longman, Fran Broady, Mary Corbishley, and others. Matgamna became a full-time theorist within the group, having moved to London.

Throughout the late 1970s and into the 1980s Matgamna remained a leader of the revived Workers' Fight. This endured through the disputes that led to the short-lived fusion with the Workers' Power group, which had briefly joined Workers' Fight in a fused grouping known as the International-Communist League. Similarly, when the I-CL fused in 1981 with the Workers' Socialist League, Matgamna was strongly identified as the central leader of one side in the factional fight that erupted within the fused group in 1982 and would split it in 1984.

One key area of disagreement in 1982 was that the inhabitants of the Falkland Islands were considered by Matgamna's side to have the right to autonomy, a position he worked through during the Falklands War: thus the group opposed Britain's war with the slogan "The Enemy is At Home", but refused positively to back the Argentine side in the war. Matgamna has also, since the mid-1970s, argued strongly for a two state solution - that is, states for both the Palestinians and Israelis - in the Middle East - even before the overthrow of capitalism in the region. By 1985, he and others, notably Clive Bradley, had won a majority in the group for this view.

== "Third Camp" position ==
In 1989, Matgamna, along with many other members of the group's national committee, by then known as the Socialist Organiser Alliance, came to reconsider some of its views on the Eastern Bloc. Rereading works by Hal Draper and Max Shachtman led him to conclude that Third Camp socialism offered an expression of many of the conclusions he had come to. It has been argued by some on the left that Matgamna's embrace of the politics of Shachtman and Draper, which he has described as "the other Trotskyism", merely reverses his embrace of the ideas of James P. Cannon in the late 1960s and throughout the 1970s.

Matgamna remains a member of the Trotskyist group he founded, now called the Alliance for Workers' Liberty.

== Pseudonyms ==
Over the years, he has used a large number of pseudonyms, including John O'Mahony, Seán Mac Mathúna, Paddy Dollard and Jack Cleary.
