= Rumblefish (band) =

UK indie pop group

- Origin: Birmingham, England
- Genres: Indie pop, alternative rock
- Years active: 1986–1992
- Labels: The Pink Label; Summerhouse; East West
- Past members: Jeremy Paige; Stuart McClure; Mister Phillips; Dominic Crane; Phil Edwards; Rupert Knowlden; Peter Byrchmore; Dawes; Phil

Rumblefish were a UK indie pop group, formed in Birmingham in 1986. After several releases on independent labels they were signed by East West who issued the band's only album while still together in 1992.

== History ==
The band was formed in 1986 with a line-up of Jeremy Paige (vocals, guitar), Stuart McClure (drums) Mister Phillips (trumpet) Their first release was the track "Theatre King" on the Pink Label's Beauty compilation. The band had an Indie hit single with "Tugboat Line" in 1987 followed by releases on Summerhouse Records ("Medicine" in 1988 and "Don't Leave Me" in 1989). The band signed to Atlantic Records imprint East West Records in 1991, releasing a self-titled album in 1992. A retrospective album of early singles called 1234 The Early Singles was released in 2006. Several tracks were also included on compilations (Beauty, It Sells or it Smells, The Sound of Leamington Spa Vol. 6). Members of the band went on to form Low Art Thrill.

== Discography ==
Chart placings shown are from the UK Indie Chart.

=== Singles ===
- "Tug Boat Line" (1987) Pink Label (#34)
- "Medicine" (1988) Summerhouse
- "Don't Leave Me" (1988) Summerhouse
- "Everything Electrical" (1992) East West America
- "Mexico" (1992) WEA

=== Albums ===
- Rumblefish (1992) East West America
- 1234 - The Early Singles (2006) Summerhouse
