= International Socialist Group =

- Leader: Collective leadership (Central Committee)
- Founded: 9 May 1987
- Dissolved: 2009
- Preceded by: International Marxist Group; League for Socialist Action
- Headquarters: London
- Ideology: Eco-socialism; Trotskyism
- International affiliation: Fourth International
- Colours: Red

Website
- www.isg-fi.org.uk

The International Socialist Group (ISG) was a Trotskyist organisation in Britain. It was the British section of the Fourth International (FI) until 2009 when it dissolved into Socialist Resistance.

== Origin ==
The ISG was the result of the 1987 fusion of two organisations, the International Group and the Socialist Group.

Former members of the Socialist League established the International Group in 1985. Sharp differences had developed within the Socialist League majority during the 1984-85 miners' strike. Initially, the FI recognised the International Group as individual members of the FI and the Socialist League as its section. The International Group and subsequently the ISG attracted several waves of ex-SL members into its organisation, beginning with a group of long time International Marxist Group leaders in 1985. It continued to win over established and emerging Socialist League minority tendencies and disaffected branches for several years.

The Socialist Group represented the continuity of the old Workers Socialist League which was expelled from Gerry Healy's Socialist Labour League in 1974 and merged with the International-Communist League as the new WSL in 1981 before being expelled in 1984. Its publication was "Socialist Viewpoint", its best-known member was Alan Thornett, and it had significant bases in Oxford and Coventry.

The two groups merged in order to re-establish a British Section of the Fourth International after a breakdown of the Socialist League. The fusion conference, on 9 and 10 May 1987, heard greetings from leaders of the Socialist Left in the German Green Party, the Fourth International and three US groups (the Fourth Internationalist Tendency, Socialist Action and Solidarity). It began with a minutes silence to salute three Trotskyist leaders and eight Provisional IRA volunteers who had died in the preceding year.

ISG members were individual members of the FI at its inception. In 1991, the ISG was recognised as a sympathising section of the Fourth International. Initially, the organisations were active in the Labour left, supporting the fortnightly Labour Briefing, and in the broad left, supporting the Chesterfield Socialist Movement. Some small groups of activists came into the ISG: in 1989, the Socialist Labour Group (SLG); in 1990, a group of Socialist League members, 'Tendency Y'; and in 1992, several young members of the Alliance for Workers' Liberty. The 1995 World Congress promoted the ISG to being its British Section.

The merged organisation drew together over 300 activists initially, and led important rearguard battles against Labour council cuts in a number of areas, notably Haringey in North London.

However, the defeat and crisis of the Labour left in the decade after the miners' strike steadily eroded the ISG. A few of former SLG members left in 1991 to form the British Committee of the European Workers' Alliance. Several members of the International Trotskyist Opposition left the organisation after the 1995 World Congress, with a few joining the Workers' International League.

== Organisation ==
The Group was controlled by a national delegate-based conference, which elected both a central committee and a control commission. Both committees elected by delegates voting between lists of candidates, known as 'slates', nominated by either an independent nominations commission or by delegates. Between CC meetings the organisation was run by a Political Committee and a number of commissions, which was elected by the CC. A number of the ISG's central committee members served on the international committee of the Fourth International including Alan Thornett, a former WSL leader, and Greg Tucker, a leader of the Socialist Alliance.

== Activity ==
The organisation regarded itself as having learned important lessons from the women's movement, gay liberation struggles and environmental movements and is oriented towards broad campaigns and recomposition of the left. It supported developments including Workers Aid for Bosnia, the Scottish Socialist Party, the Socialist Alliance, the International Socialist Movement, the World Social Forum, the Respect coalition, Hands Off Venezuela, the Palestine Solidarity Campaign and the Campaign against Climate Change.

Alongside its own journal the ISG sponsored Socialist Resistance, a magazine produced jointly with the smaller Socialist Solidarity Network and some individuals. By 2009, the group's membership had fallen somewhere around 70, the number signed up to its members-only email discussion group.

Reflecting the support of the Fourth International for the European Anticapitalist Left, the ISG joined Respect coalition in England and Wales. Alan Thornett sat on Respect's National Council, and was an organiser of the Respect Renewal movement. The ISG also strongly supported the Scottish Socialist Party, and opposed the split from that party which created the Solidarity movement in Scotland. The Group called for a first preference vote for the Green Party candidate, the eco-socialist Siân Berry, in the 2008 London mayoral election.

Preceded by Socialist Action	British Section of the Fourth International; 1989–2009	Succeeded by Socialist Resistance
