= Feminist Fightback =

Feminist Fightback is a feminist anti-capitalist activist collective based in the UK.

== History and views ==
Feminist Fightback developed out of conferences in 2006 and 2007.

Feminist Fightback are considered part of what Robinson has called a "resurgence of feminist activism" in the UK. Dean has described it as a socialist group.

== Activism ==
In 2008, Feminist Fightback supported London Underground cleaners who went on strike over a living wage, sick pay, 28 days' holiday, final salary pension, free travel and an end to third party sackings.

On 31 January 2015, Feminist Fightback joined housing activists, unions and campaigners to march on Boris Johnson, then Mayor of London, in City Hall and to demand better housing for London.

In 2017, Feminist Fightback supported the strike action by cleaners at the London School of Economics.

Feminist Fightback argues that public sector cuts have a disproportionate effect on women, and it has campaigned against what it perceives as the disproportionate effect of austerity measures on women.

Feminist Fightback has supported the so-called Focus E15 Campaign in campaigning against the housing crisis and lack of affordable housing available in the UK.

Feminist Fightback are amongst a number of groups, organisations and activists in the UK (including Calais Migrant Solidarity, No One Is Illegal, and London No Borders) campaigning for migrants' rights and freedom of movement and against immigration controls.
