= Ethical Threads =

British clothing manufacturer

Ethical Threads is a clothing manufacturer based in the United Kingdom. The company is wholly owned by the Battersea and Wandsworth Trades Union Council and the London Region GMB Union. The company was created as a source of ethical non-sweatshop clothing, and all producers follow international conventions of workers rights and will not employ child labour. Ethical Threads' organically grown cotton is supplied by the Vasudha Cotton Project in India to the Oeko-tex standard.

The company was boosted in 2002 when the Glastonbury Festival sourced official merchandise from Ethical Threads, who used disabled workers at Remploy for manufacturing. That year, Ethical Threads hosted The Left Field area of the festival. The Glastonbury Festival subsequently banned sweatshop sourced clothing following a campaign by Billy Bragg.

A report by the Maquila Solidarity Network highlighted the difficulty small organisations like Ethical Threads have in ethical sourcing, because they often lack clear labour standards and certification criteria, and monitoring programmes, that advocates demand of larger brands.
