= The Brilliant Corners =

British indie pop band

The Brilliant Corners were a British indie pop band from Bristol who recorded throughout the 1980s and into the early 1990s.

== History ==
The group was formed in 1983, taking the name from the Thelonious Monk jazz album, Brilliant Corners. The line-up included Davey Woodward (b. Avonmouth, Bristol, England; vocals, guitar), Chris Galvin (1959 – 22 December 1998; bass guitar), Winston Forbes (lead guitar, percussion, backing vocals), Bob Morris (drums) and Dan Pacini (occasional trumpet and keyboards). A later addition was Phil Elvins on guitar.

The band's first releases were early examples of indie pop, with three singles being released in 1984 on their own SS20 label. Their first (mini-)album, Growing Up Absurd, appeared the following year. With an explosion of indie pop groups in 1986, their May release Fruit Machine EP gained them both attention and radio airplay, followed by a second mini-album, What's In A Word. "Brian Rix", a re-recorded version of a track from the LP, with added trumpet, and a tribute to Rix, the "king of farce", was issued as a single, the proceeds going to Mencap, the charity of which Rix was chairman. The video, featuring Woodward running Rix-like around a couch with his trousers around his ankles, was shown on The Tube, further raising the band's profile.

In March 1988, the band set up another label, McQueen, and released third album, Somebody Up There Likes Me, followed by a collection of their sought-after early singles, Everything I Ever Wanted. Two more albums followed in 1989 (Joy Ride) and 1990 (Hooked), followed by a second compilation, Creamy Stuff, in 1991. They released A History Of White Trash in 1993 before splitting up.

Woodward and Galvin formed the Experimental Pop Band in 1995. Galvin died from cancer in 1998.

The Brilliant Corners reformed in 2013 for a short tour.

Winston Forbes died in 2019.

== Band members ==
- Davey Woodward (vocals, guitar)
- Winston Forbes (guitar)
- Chris Galvin (bass)
- Bob Morris (drums)
- Dan Pacini (trumpet, keyboards)
- Phil Elvins (guitar)
- Paul Sandrone (guitar)

== Discography ==
Chart placings shown are from the UK Indie Chart.

=== Singles ===
- "She's Got Fever" (1984, SS20) (No. 1)
- "Big Hip" (1984, SS20) (No. 16)
- "My Baby's In Black" (1984, SS20) (No. 14)
- "Brian Rix" (1987, SS20) (No. 11)
- "Delilah Sands" (1987, SS20) (No. 9)
- "Teenage" (1988, McQueen) (No. 9)
- "Why Do You Have To Go Out With Him When You Could Go Out With Me?" (1988, McQueen) (No. 10)
- "I Love It, I Lost It" (1990, McQueen)
- "The Pope, The Monkey and The Queen" (1990, McQueen)

=== EPs and mini-albums ===
- Growing Up Absurd mini-album (1985, SS20) (No. 26)
- The Fruit Machine EP (1986, SS20)

=== Albums ===
- What's In A Word (1986, SS20) (No. 8)
- Somebody Up There Likes Me (2006, McQueen) (No. 6)
- Joy Ride (1989, McQueen) (No. 6)
- Hooked (1990, McQueen)
- A History Of White Trash (1993, C.M.P.)

=== Compilations ===
- Everything I Ever Wanted (1988, McQueen) (compilation) (No. 17)
- Creamy Stuff (1991, McQueen)
- Heart on Your Sleeve: A Decade in Pop 1983–1993 (2013, Cherry Red)

== See also ==
- List of Bands from Bristol
- Culture of Bristol
- List of Record Labels from Bristol
