= John Lawrence (political activist) =

British political activist (1915-2002)

John Gordon Michael Lawrence (29 September 1915 – 14 November 2002) was a British political activist who was a leading far-left activist in a wide variety of groups in Britain.

== Early life ==
Born in Sandhurst, Berkshire, aged fourteen Lawrence enlisted in the British Army as a bandsman. He left the Army and toured the country in the Great Depression, seeing the suffering endured by people and joining first the unemployed workers' movement, then in 1937 the Communist Party of Great Britain (CPGB). His opposition to the Molotov–Ribbentrop Pact led him to leave the CPGB and join instead the Trotskyist Revolutionary Workers League in 1939.

A supporter of Isaac Deutscher, Lawrence followed him into the Workers International League (WIL) in 1941 and then left to join the Revolutionary Socialist League (RSL). In that organisation, he became the industrial organiser, and the prime exponent of Trotsky's Proletarian Military Policy. However, this was a policy strongly supported by the WIL, who began paying Lawrence for his activities. As a result, he was expelled from the RSL.

== Trotskyism ==
Shortly after his expulsion, Lawrence was contacted by Sam Gordon of the American Socialist Workers Party, and began to work for the SWP and became the Fourth International's representative in Britain. He helped organise a fusion of the assorted Trotskyist groups into the Revolutionary Communist Party. After a spell as South Wales organiser, during which he was active in supporting Jock Haston's candidacy in the 1945 Neath by-election, he became the editor of Socialist Outlook while working as a coal miner in Cannock Chase. He allied himself with Gerry Healy to form The Club, remaining a key member through turmoil in the British Trotskyist movement.

The split of Lawrence from Healy mirrored the later 1953 split in the Fourth International. Healy supported James P. Cannon and what became the International Committee of the Fourth International, while Lawrence initially supported Michel Pablo and the International Secretariat of the Fourth International. This led to a dispute over control of Socialist Outlook, which was ultimately won by Healy. Lawrence resigned as editor and began contributing instead to Tribune, a Labour Party publication. He turned increasingly towards Stalinism. He also disagreed with Pablo's attempts to get the ICFI members to attend the ISFI-organised 1954 congress of the Fourth International. He allied himself with the Socialist Union of America's position, that the FI should dissolve, and claimed he was taking Pabloism to its "logical conclusion" - much to Pablo's disagreement.

== Labour Party ==
Lawrence united at the Congress with the American group and minorities of the French and Canadian groups and walked out alongside them after failed in their attempts to propose that the International should dissolve. He later claimed that he has been criticised at the congress for Stalinist views. In October 1954, he dissolved the British Section of the International Secretariat, tending to support the entry of its members into the Labour Party rather than the Communist Party. His supporters remained a loose grouping, with particular strength in car manufacturing trade union organisation. Lawrence had joined the Labour Party with The Club several years before, and in 1956 was elected leader of St Pancras Council. There he reduced rents, fought against restoring requisitioned property to the private sector, and declared May Day a paid holiday, raising the Red Flag over the Town Hall on May Day 1958 and as a result being arrested.

He worked increasingly closely with the Communist Party; his support for Nikita Khrushchev's Secret Speech and the Soviet invasion of Hungary in 1956 led to the dropping of links with the Socialist Union. Following the Red Flag incident, he was expelled from the Labour Party, and subsequently joined the CPGB with some of his supporters. For refusing to implement rent rises, he was surcharged and jailed for three months in 1960. His disagreements with the British Road to Socialism led to him leaving the CPGB again in 1964, while he moved to work for the Press Association and became an activist in the Society of Graphical and Allied Trades.

== Communism and syndicalism ==
Following his disillusionment with what he saw as the CPGB's reformism and opposition to real struggle, Lawrence became a syndicalist, associated first with Solidarity, then the Syndicalist Workers Federation, the London Anarchist Group, founding Workers Mutual Aid and the London May Day Committee.

In the early 1970s, he wrote extensively for Freedom, and worked on campaigns with Brian Behan, but in 1973 he was expelled from his union and moved to Shoreham-by-Sea and entered semi-retirement.
