= Jimmy Deane =

British Trotskyist

James (Jimmy) Augustus Bargrave Deane (31 January 1921 – 21 August 2002) was a British Trotskyist who played a significant role in building the Revolutionary Socialist League. Along with Jock Haston and Ted Grant, he played a role during the Second World War in the Revolutionary Communist Party, the British section of the Fourth International. He was from an Anglo-Irish Architectural family that included Alexander Deane mayor and freeman of Cork, the father of the architect Sir Thomas Deane.

== Early years ==
Jimmy Deane was born in Liverpool to a blacksmith, Gus Deane, and his wife, Gertie, a trained nurse. Deane came from a long line of trade unionists in the Labour movement in Merseyside – Deane's maternal grandfather Charles Carrick was elected president of the Liverpool Trades Council in 1905, served for fourteen years as one of Labour's first councillors, and was an organiser for the Marxist Social Democratic Federation. Carrick, like many trade unionists at that time, remained active within the Labour Party when the Social Democratic Federation left. Deane's mother and brothers were all in the Trotskyist movement and were members of the Walton Constituency Labour Party in the 1950s and 1960s. The origins of Trotskyism to which the Deanes were attracted can be traced to Albert Houghton, a founding member of the Communist Party in Merseyside who had drawn Trotskyist conclusions and fought the Stalinists in Merseyside who later became leading Labour figures.

Joining the Labour Party in 1937, he was later that year won over to Trotskyism and joined the Militant Group. Through him his mother Gertie was recruited, and then his brothers Arthur and Brian, who also played an important role in the Trotskyist movement.

In 1939, with growing fragmentation within the Militant Group, Gerry Healy a member of an earlier breakaway from that group, the Workers International League (WIL) formed in 1937, was able to recruit the Deanes, along with Eric Brewer, Tommy Birchall and Harry Matthews to the new group.

== During the Second World War ==
Due to serving an apprenticeship at the Cammell Laird shipyard as an electrical engineer, he was not called up during the Second World War, and became a shop steward. In January 1944 he was trained as a miner, due to wartime legislation, and worked at Nook Pit, Tyldesley before he was invalided out of work at the end of the year.

For most of 1945, Jimmy Deane became a full-time worker for the newly formed Revolutionary Communist Party as its London Industrial Organiser and joined the party's central committee and editorial board of the Socialist Appeal, the party's journal.

In 1946 Deane was the British delegate to the International Conference of the Fourth International alongside Jock Haston. He stayed in Paris for a further 18 months as the British representative on the International Executive Committee.

== Revolutionary Socialist League ==
Deane was one of the founders of the Revolutionary Socialist League in 1956 and was appointed as its first General Secretary.

Deane was to go on several international missions of behalf of the International during this period including going to Morocco to help the Algerian FLN break through the electrified Algerian/Moroccan border as well as attempting to unite Indian Trotskyists in Calcutta, Bombay and Madras into a single all-India organisation.

After attempting to bring about an unsuccessful fusion between the RSL and the International Group as well as joint work with the International Socialists in the magazine Young Guard, Jimmy Deane suggested Peter Taaffe as his successor as General Secretary and editor of the soon to be launched Militant newspaper. He left Britain for India in 1965 and subsequently spent a few years in Fiji.

Although he returned to Britain he did not resume his active role in the Trotskyist movement: he remained loyal to his political beliefs, speaking at a meeting in Wigan against the witch-hunt of Militant in the Labour Party. At the end of his life he declared his support for the Socialist Appeal tendency, and emphasised that "A Marxist tendency must combat any traces of ultra-leftism that arise out of impatience". Jimmy Deane died of pneumonia alone on 21 August 2002 at the Rosebank Nursing Home in Liverpool.
