= Harry Wicks =

British socialist activist (1905–1989)

Harry Wicks (16 August 1905 – 26 March 1989) was a British socialist activist.

Born in Battersea, London, he went to work on the railways and joined the National Union of Railwaymen in 1919. He joined the Labour Party, but after Black Friday moved to the Communist Party of Great Britain (CPGB). After studying with A. E. Reade, he came to support Leon Trotsky and the International Left Opposition.

Elected to the executive of the Young Communist League in 1926, Wicks attended the International Lenin School in Moscow and the Sixth World Congress of the Comintern. He began working with the Balham Group of Trotskyists, and was expelled from the CPGB in 1932. He became a founding member of the Communist League and met Trotsky in Copenhagen but disagreed with Trotsky's advice to join the Independent Labour Party.

The Communist League split with the tendency opposed to joining the ILP continuing as the Marxist League, which later worked within the Labour Party. He also chaired the British Committee for the Defence of Leon Trotsky.

In 1936, Wicks and several others signed a letter to the Manchester Guardian defending Trotsky's right to asylum and calling for an international inquiry into the Moscow Trials. Wicks was also an active anti-fascist.

Wicks began working with C. L. R. James of the Marxist Group, helping James write World Revolution, his 1937 history of the Communist International, and in 1938 their tendencies merged to form the Revolutionary Socialist League. However, Wicks and the remnants of the former Marxist League soon left and formed the Socialist Anti-War Front (SAWF); in 1940, this group dissolved and he joined the Independent Labour Party.

At the end of the Second World War, Wicks joined the Labour Party and became active in NALGO. In 1971, he became involved with the Trotskyist movement again, joining the forerunner of the Socialist Workers Party (SWP), the International Socialists. He was part of the 1976 split which formed the Workers League. He would later work with the SWP in various campaigns but never rejoined it.

Not long before his death he wrote an autobiography, Keeping My Head: The Memoirs of a British Bolshevik, with the help of Logie Barrow.

== Sources ==
- Oxford Dictionary of National Biography
- Sam Bornstein and Al Richardson, Against the Stream, Socialist Platform, 1986
- Sam Bornstein and Al Richardson, War and The International, Socialist Platform, 1986
- Harry Wicks, Keeping My Head: The Memoirs of a British Bolshevik, Socialist Platform, 1992.
