= Jock Haston =

James "Jock" Ritchie Haston (1913–1986) was a Trotskyist politician and General Secretary of the Revolutionary Communist Party in Britain.

== Early years ==
Haston was born in Edinburgh and went to sea in the merchant navy where he became a member of the Communist Party of Great Britain (CPGB). He moved to Trotskyism in the mid 1930s, after splitting with the CPGB in 1934 upon watching Soviet ships break the public trade boycott of Nazi Germany. The Paddington group, which he led, joined the Militant Group led by Denzil Dean Harber, and in 1937 when a group of South African Trotskyists appeared in London, it was Haston who moved their acceptance of membership in the Trotskyist group.

The South Africans were led by Ralph Lee (born Raphael Levy), hence they were referred to as the "Lee Group," and had been active in that country. A dispute with the Communist Party of South Africa was to follow them to Britain however, and it was alleged that Lee had stolen strike funds from a group of workers. These allegations would in time be proven to be lies, but were reported to the Militant Group by Charlie van Gelderen, an earlier immigrant from South Africa, and led to the split of those members of the group working with Lee.

By the time the truth had been established, and the International Secretariat of the Trotskyist movement had exonerated Lee, the damage had been done, and the comrades had formed a new organisation. The new group known as the Workers International League (WIL) was organised in late 1937. In its first days, the small group was led by Lee, but when he returned to South Africa in 1941 Haston became the leading figure within the growing organisation. He also formed a personal alliance with Millie Lee at this time.

In contrast to the official British section of the Fourth International, the Revolutionary Socialist League (RSL), the WIL was to experience serious growth in this period recruiting supporters from the CPGB, the RSL and from within the Labour Party. Again, unlike the official section, the WIL accepted the Fourth International Proletarian Military Policy (PMP) although not without an internal struggle that pitted a minority around Haston, Millie Lee (né Kuhn) and Sam Levy against Ted Grant and Gerry Healy. Haston emerged the victor from this factional tussle, and the PMP was adapted to the needs of the WIL.

Haston was also a member of the delegation which was sent to Ireland early in the war to prepare a fall back party centre in the event of being made illegal, and having to function underground as had happened to revolutionaries in the previous war. In the event they remained legal, although they were persecuted at one point and the Government spied on them, and the delegation returned to Britain one by one. While in Ireland, they recruited additional supporters to their cause, aiding in the establishment of an Irish Trotskyist movement. Haston was the last to return from Ireland and was arrested and jailed as he was travelling on false papers, his own having been passed to a comrade evading military service.

After 1941, and the turn of the CPGB to support of the war, the WIL recruited a number of militants from the CPGB in large part due to their concentration on industrial work. They also sought and succeeded in recruiting from the declining Independent Labour Party, picking up members in the Tyneside region. When an apprentices' dispute developed in that area they were then well placed to intervene and as a result Haston was to find himself in jail.

This short term behind bars was because the Trades Disputes Act of 1927 was used against the supporters of the strike among whom the WIL were prominent. Their earlier support for unofficial strikes in the coalfields, particularly in Kent, had also drawn upon them the attention of the authorities.

== Leadership ==
Shortly after this dispute, the WIL was to merge with the Revolutionary Socialist League the factionally divided official section of the Fourth International (FI), to become the Revolutionary Communist Party (RCP). Haston was by this time seen as the foremost leader of the Trotsky movement in Britain.

Like the WIL, the new party was opposed to the electoral truce of the war years between the Labour and Conservative parties. However, they had been far too small to be able to break the truce in earlier by-elections, so when the Neath Division fell open they sought to take advantage, and Haston was the obvious choice of candidate.

Despite the RCP lacking a branch in Neath at the start of the campaign, Haston was able to poll 1,781 votes in the 1945 Neath by-election. An RCP branch was constructed and literature sales were relatively large. Haston's relations with the Labor candidate, D. J. Williams, seem to have been personally harmonious, so much so that later in 1949 Williams was instrumental in finding Haston a job with the National Council of Labour Colleges.

With the turn of the war against the Nazis, the RCP was at pains to look for any signs of the coming revolutionary upheavals that were expected in line with the perspectives of the Fourth International as outlined in the famous Transitional Program. The leading theoretician of the RCP, Ted Grant, was therefore far seeing when he sought to tailor the political demands of the movement to the actual movement rather than succumbing to a rosy view of events. This realistic view of events was also prompted by the agreement of the RCP leadership with the documents of the Goldman-Morrow-Heijenoort minority in the American Socialist Workers Party.

== Fourth International ==
In 1946 Haston led a delegation of the RCP to a conference of some of the sections of the Fourth International (FI) in Paris; he considered the conference as a congress of the movement. This was motivated in part by the opposition of the RCP to the demoralisation of the German comrades of the International Communists of Germany (IKD).

Haston and Bill Hunter proposed amendments to the resolutions that the FI's leadership put forward at the meeting. In contrast to the FI leadership, the amendments argued that Stalinism had emerged from the war strengthened, and that an economic crisis was unlikely in the near future. Therefore, it was argued, political demands and expectations had to recognise these changes, and not pose revolutionary tasks in the absence of a revolutionary situation. However, the FI majority around Ernest Mandel and Michel Pablo, backed by the Socialist Workers Party in the United States, prevailed and the amendnments were rejected.

The dispute with the leadership of the FI deepened with time, and came to be centred on three interlinked questions. First, the RCP's position on the role of Stalinism in Eastern Europe was different from the FI's: in particular, when the latter began to support Josip Broz Tito in Yugoslavia against the USSR the RCP became very critical. This criticism was expressed in documents written by Haston. Second, there was the question of economic perspectives and the growing tendency of the Labour government of Clement Attlee to take various industries into state ownership, as was also happening in eastern Europe. Again, it was Haston who, in the pages of Socialist Appeal, opposed the idea that state ownership could be equated with any form of socialism. A complementary document on more general economic perspectives was written for the RCP by Tony Cliff, who later acknowledged that he had been greatly influenced by Haston in this period. Finally, there was the question of whether or not the RCP should enter the Labour Party as a body. Haston opposed this idea. In 1947, however, an FI-sponsored minority led by Gerry Healy was granted permission by the FI to join the Labour Party, against the democratically decided views of the RCP.

Under pressure from the FI the RCP dissolved itself in 1949. Most of its former members, including Haston, joined Healy in "The Club". Haston, demoralised by the problems that Trotskyism had been undergoing in Britain since the end of the war, resigned from the movement in February 1950. He remained active in the Labour Party for the rest of his life, becoming a lecturer for the National Council of Labour Colleges and then educational director for the Electrical, Electronic, Telecommunications and Plumbing Union (EETPU).
