= Revolutionary Communist Party (UK, 1944) =

Political party in the United Kingdom

- Leader: Jock Haston
- Founded: 1944
- Dissolved: 1950
- Merger of: Workers' International League; Revolutionary Socialist League
- Succeeded by: The Club
- Membership: 300-500 (1946)
- Ideology: Trotskyism
- Political position: Far-left
- International affiliation: Fourth International

The Revolutionary Communist Party was a British Trotskyist group, formed in 1944 and active until 1949, which published the newspaper Socialist Appeal and a theoretical journal, Workers International News. The party was the ancestor of the three main currents of British Trotskyism: Gerry Healy's Workers Revolutionary Party, Ted Grant's Militant and Tony Cliff's Socialist Workers Party.

== History ==
The RCP was formed out of the merging of two rival parties: the Revolutionary Socialist League (RSL) and the Workers International League (WIL). The RSL had been recognised as the official contingent of the Fourth International since 1939 and the international had a poor view of the WIL. The WIL, however, grew during the war to become a larger organisation than the RSL.

An official conference was held in January 1944 to discuss the merging of the two groups. The new organisation was originally going to keep the RSL's name, and the negotiating committee was extremely against calling the new group a party, until Jock Haston convinced the group to adopt Revolutionary Communist Party as the name by February 1944.

The merger officially occurred in March 1944. The merger had been promoted by the International Secretariat of the Fourth International (ISFI), and the two groups had originally began talks during the early 1940s. Many members in the RSL were against the merger.

In 1944, Haston, Roy Tearse, Heaton Lee and Ann Keene were all arrested under the Trades Disputes Act for breaching a striking ban (they had been involved in the Tyne apprentices strike in April 1944) that had been agreed upon by the TUC in 1940.

The RCP opposed the electoral truce since 1940, which guaranteed that where parliamentary seats fell vacant they would automatically be filled by another member of the incumbent party. When an opportunity for the RCP to stand occurred, the party stood their leader, Jock Haston, in the Neath by-election of 1945, obtaining 1,781 votes (4.58% of total votes). After the war, Haston's group "argued that capitalism was moving into a temporary boom, that the workers supported Labour’s reforms and that no organised left, still less a revolutionary current, was emerging in the constituencies."

Haston's leadership of the party was challenged by Gerry Healy, who was backed by the Paris leadership of the Fourth International and James P. Cannon, the leader of the SWP in the US.

== Decline and Dissolution ==
The debate over entryism began in 1945, with Healy arguing that the working class would be radicalised via militants inside the Labour Party. The RCP disagreed, as they had recruited more people from the Communist Party of Great Britain than the Labour Party. The RCP's position led to conflict with the Fourth International and its leadership as the FI argued for entryism in the Labour Party due to its unique alignment with the working class and trade unions. The RCP also differed on their stance regarding the state of capitalism, believing that a post-war boom would occur for one to two years, and would delay the collapse of capitalism.

The conflict between the RCP and the FI continued in January 1947, where the international maintained their disagreement with the RCP's prediction of an economic boom, via a letter to the RCP's central committee. The RCP responded, claiming that they would be better working within the trade unions to pressure Labour. Meanwhile Healy continued his opposition to the RCP majority, argued that the party must revise their analysis on capitalism. Historian John Callaghan described this revision as: "This view, which regards the Leninist conception of the imperialist epoch as synonymous with the stagnation of the capitalist world economy, was also put forward by the leadership of the [Fourth International]." In September 1947 Ernest Mandel involved himself, on behalf of the international, stating that: "...in the period of capitalist decadence British industry can no longer overgrow the state of revival and attain one of real boom". The FI would continue this line in a November 1947 document, which also predicted catastrophe in France and Italy.

Healy's minority faction and disagreements with the leadership has led to the conclusion by John Callaghan that Healy wished to coup the leadership rather than change the tactics of the party. He also reasons that: "The voting figures from the RCP's conference of 1946 showed that the minority acted as a faction for at least a year before it declared itself such." The stagnation of the party also contributed to the ISFI splitting the party.

The Left Fraction of the former RSL remained organised within the RCP but were expelled in 1945 and pursued entrist work in the Labour Party work around the Voice of Labour newspaper. It broke up in 1950, when most of its members joined the Socialist Fellowship group which was associated with the paper Socialist Outlook. Other former Left Fraction members revived the group in the early 1960s.

In 1947, the party split over the question of entrism into the Labour Party. The majority, led by Haston and Ted Grant, opposed it; a minority, led by Healy and John Lawrence, formed a faction in favour of it. With the agreement of both groups, the leadership of the Fourth International divided the British section, with both remaining members. The minority pursued the entry tactic and published the newspaper Socialist Outlook from 1948.

In December 1948, the RCP acknowledged, via a statement, the limits of acting as an open party and stated that Labour Party entryism was the best and only option. A majority in the RCP, however, still voiced their opposition to this, the position held by Healy's minority and the FI.

The RCP were also being undermined by young members rejoining the CPGB who had previously left, and workers remaining loyal to the Labour Party.

The new regimes in Eastern Europe caused further debate within the RCP, as they did within the International as a whole. The leadership of the RCP around Haston was more cautious with regard to declaring these new regimes to be degenerated workers states than the International's leadership around Ernest Mandel and Michel Pablo.

Haston's group declined in influence. A faction was declared by some supporters of the leadership which firmly opposed entry, calling itself "the Open Party Faction"; it was increasingly disillusioned with the leadership around Haston and Grant who they thought to be caving in to Healy's entry group. By June 1949, Haston's group shifted to a policy of entrism, and the last 150 members of the party merged with the minority in Healy's "The Club".

Haston left the Fourth International in June 1950, citing the inability for the organisation to analyse or observe contemporary developments. Haston dropped out of politics as did much of the remaining leadership. Ted Grant made a decision to join the fused group but was purged by Healy who strongly discouraged dissent.

Some of Tony Cliff's supporters in Birmingham were expelled – Cliff himself could not be expelled being resident in Dublin and therefore beyond Healy's reach – and then when Grant attempted to defend the rights of Cliff's supporters he too was expelled. Cliff would regroup his supporters around the magazine Socialist Review and Grant similarly formed a group called the International Socialist Group. Most former members of the RCP had left the Trotskyist movement by the end of 1951.

Former RCP members went on to establish the three main postwar British Trotskyist groups: Cliff's International Socialists (later the Socialist Workers Party), Grant's Revolutionary Socialist League (later Militant), and Healy's Socialist Labour League (later the Workers' Revolutionary Party).

== Organisation ==
The WIL had taken a position similar to the Proletarian Military Policy adopted by the Fourth International (and its large US member, the Socialist Workers Party) on issues to do with war, while the RSL had described these as "social patriotic". The new leadership body, mostly made up of ex-WIL members, also incorporated leaders from the RSL such as Denzil Dean Harber and John Lawrence, with the exception of the old RSL Left Fraction who soon left.

The main area on which the party concentrated, however, was the industrial front. This led to recruitment from the Communist Party but more recruits came from direct intervention in the industrial struggles of the war years such as that of the Kent miners and the Tyneside engineering apprentices. This latter dispute led to the RCP receiving the attention of the police as their headquarters in London were raided and a number of leading members were jailed. The Militant Workers Federation was organised by the RCP in conjunction with the Industrial Committee of the Independent Labour Party and some anarchists. The group was successful until 1947, when the CPGB's actions overshadowed the RCP's and the MWF was disbanded.

The RCP also took over the Building Workers' Campaign Committee, which had been abandoned by the CPGB, publishing a national bulletin in June 1946 however by January 1948 the committee no longer existed.

The new party believed in "open work" under its own independent identity. This position would put them at odds with the ISFI, however their economic positions remained relatively similar to the international. Keith Gilbert and David Howell explained it as: "The RCP was initially largely united in predicting an impending capitalist collapse, revolutionary opportunity and thus the need for an open party."

The group did also engage in fractional entryism within the Independent Labour Party and Labour Party. This faction was led by Charlie van Gelderen and maintained publication of The Militant as its canvassing organ. Entryism into the ILP ceased in September 1946.

== Members ==
- Jim Allen
- Sam Bornstein
- Maurice Brinton
- Tony Cliff
- Jimmy Deane
- Charlie van Gelderen
- Mildred Gordon
- Ted Grant
- Duncan Hallas
- Betty Hamilton
- Denzil Dean Harber
- Jock Haston
- Gerry Healy
- Jeanne Hoban
- Bill Hunter
- John Lawrence
- Anil Moonesinghe
- Stan Newens
- T. Dan Smith

Preceded by Revolutionary Socialist League	British Section of the Fourth International; 1944–1949	Succeeded by The Club
