= Pub crawl =

Visiting multiple pubs or bars in a series

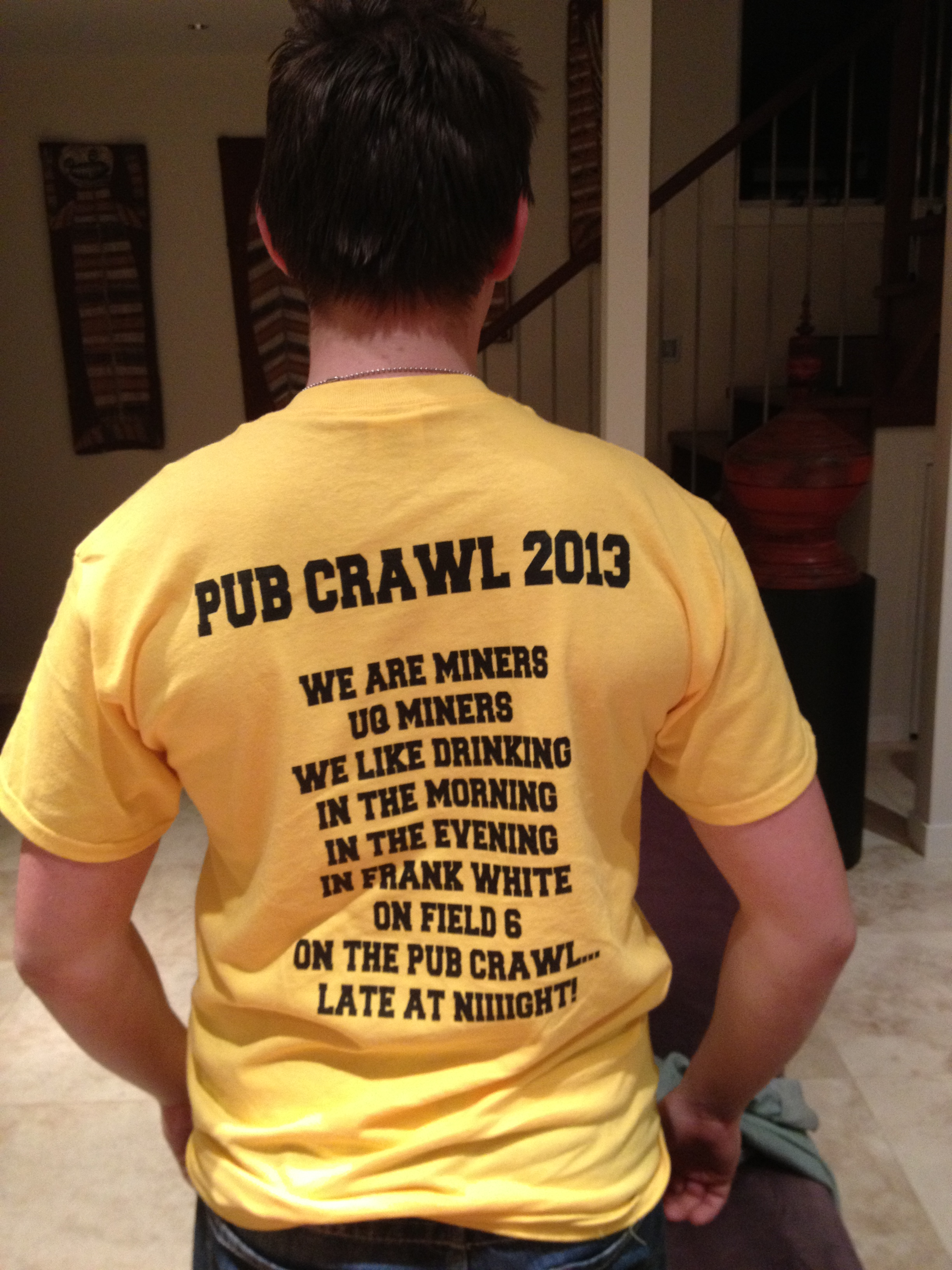
Organised pub crawl groups may provide T-shirts for participants.

A pub crawl (sometimes called a bar tour, bar crawl or bar-hopping) is the act of visiting multiple pubs or bars in a single session. Many are social gatherings for local expatriates and tourists, while others are student events.

== Background ==
Many European cities have public pub crawls that serve as social gatherings for local expatriates and tourists.

In the United Kingdom, pub crawls are often spontaneous, and are not predetermined by either the participants or a well-known route in the local area. However, structured routes with regular stops also exist.

In the north of Spain, around the Basque Country, the tradition for groups of male friends crawling pubs and drinking a short glass of wine at each pub, and often singing traditional songs, is known as txikiteo or chiquiteo, and can be held at night or day. By the end of the 20th century, it was extended also to women, and when it involves a wider variety of drinks, it is more often called poteo.

== By country ==
=== Australia ===
In Adelaide, a pub crawl is run annually by The Adelaide University Engineering Society (AUES). The event attracts students from all over South Australia to as many as 34 local pubs and clubs. In 2015 the event had 6,000 participants while 2014 and 2013 both had 5,000 participants.

In Brisbane, the Mining and Metallurgy Association (MAMA) at the University of Queensland have been awarded the Brisbane City Council (BCC) and University of Queensland Union (UQU) Award for Social Activities of the Year due to their well-known Pub Crawl.

A pub crawl held annually in Maryborough, Queensland, Australia, attracted 4,718 participants on 14 June 2009. Since the early 1990s disability advocate Des Ryan OAM has organised an annual Accessible Pub Crawl in Rockhampton during which groups of up to 40 people travel by bus from venue to venue. After visiting each pub questionnaires are filled out rating positives and negatives in terms of accessibility and information is later given to hotel management and shared in the media.

=== Belgium ===
The city of Antwerp has a tradition called "elfkroegentocht" or "eleven bars walk" where a company, often friends or work relatives, will celebrate by walking from one bar to the next and have a "bolleke" of De Koninck beer at each. The figure of "11" may refer to carnival festivities.

=== Finland ===
In Finland, pub crawls are a common student event, usually by the name of appro. The best known appro events attract students from all over the country: Hämeenkadun Appro in Tampere has roughly 10,000 participants every year, Kauppakadun Appro in Jyväskylä has c. 8000.

Often the participants of the event receive a jacket patch, which is then sewn onto the student boilersuits worn by many in the appro events. Normally, the colour of the patch depends on how many drinks one has had during the pub crawl; for example, in Kauppakadun Appro, getting the golden patch requires 17 drinks from women and 19 drinks from men.

=== Ireland ===
A pub crawl in December is called the "12 pubs of Christmas" in which participants try to drink one drink in 12 pubs while wearing Christmas clothes.

=== Japan ===
In Japan, pub crawls are called hashigozake (はしご酒, literally "Ladder Alcohol") and are a part of the night-life. Events of organized pub crawls are also common in the country.

=== New Zealand ===
The annual Talk Like a Pirate Day pubcrawl is run in New Plymouth every year. It started in 2005 with only three pirates and over the years has grown to hundreds.

=== United Kingdom ===
In Glasgow, the Subcrawl is a pub crawl carried out using the circular Glasgow Subway line in the city. It involves having a drink at the nearest pub to each of the 15 stops on the line.

In Leeds, the Otley Run is seen as a rite of passage for students.

In London, the Monopoly board pub crawl is based around having a drink at a pub in each of the places on a British Monopoly board, set in London. Thousands of New Zealanders take part in the annual Waitangi Day pub crawl, which takes place around the Circle Line on the London Underground. Starting at Paddington they work anti-clockwise around the line, ending at Westminster for a haka (traditional New Zealand challenge/dance). While numbers vary depending on the weather, in 2008 there were reported to be around 12,000 people involved. First started by the historian Al Richardson in the 1960s, the Karl Marx pub crawl is based around various pubs the communist philosopher is reputed to have drunk at in and around Soho.

In York and Gloucester, there is an annual charity event known as the Assize of Ale. It is based on the medieval Assize of Bread and Ale and, in York, is led by the Guild of Scriveners and Sheriff of the City. In Gloucester, it is led by the Sheriff of Gloucester, the Town Crier and other local characters.

The 2013 film The World's End starring Simon Pegg and Nick Frost is plotted around a group of friends embarking on a pub crawl in their home town.

=== United States ===
The Running A Tab Pub Run takes place monthly in San Antonio, Texas, and is hosted by WeRunSanAntonio. The original Running A Tab Pub Run covered 5 miles in downtown San Antonio. The starting point was the historic Sunset Station and finished at the Blue Star Brewery and Art Complex. The event is held in conjunction with San Antonio's First Friday Art Walk. In 2009 the route was modified to accommodate the more than 500 participants every month. Running A Tab now consists of a 3-mile downtown loop and 5 bars/restaurants. A theme is selected every month and participants dress in costume in accordance with the theme. The event is free and open to the public.

In Charlotte, North Carolina, there is a yearly pub crawl on the Saturday nearest to Saint Patrick's Day sponsored by Rich and Bennett. According to the Rich and Bennett website it is billed as the World's Largest Pub Crawl with over 20,000 participants all wearing the event t-shirts. In 2020 it was postponed due to the coronavirus Pandemic. It was rescheduled for 27 June.

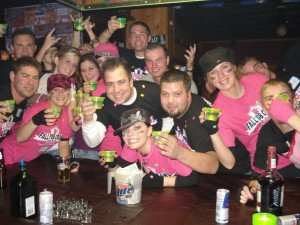
2008 Oshkosh Fall Pub Crawl

An annual Saint Patrick's Day bar crawl, LepreCon, takes place in Hoboken, New Jersey. The 2016 event, held in the evening 5–6 March, degenerated into a violent brawl. Fifteen people were arrested and 35 hospitalized, including two police officers. The officers were injured when one of the participants was seeking to flee the scene. Hoboken police responded to 432 calls from service during the event and issued 54 tickets, mostly for public drinking. The 2015 event resulted in 93 summonses and 11 arrests. The 2016 LepreCont cost the City of Hoboken $110,000 in police overtime. Two hundred officers were deployed for the event. Hoboken's police chief, Ken Ferrante, said he was "disturbed by the repeated behavior that is occurring on these types of themed events," and said he "will not tolerate having any of our officers injured, for the purposes of a few to make a financial profit at the expense of our residents."

In Louisville, Kentucky, the "Bambi Walk" has been underway since the 1980s.

In Minneapolis, Minnesota, a zombie-themed pub crawl commenced in 2005 and had grown to over 30,000 participants in 2012.

At Epcot in Walt Disney World, guests often do a form of bar crawl known as Drink Around the World, where visitors attempt to drink at all eleven countries of World Showcase.

== Santa-themed pub crawls ==
SantaCon in New York City, 2011, video

The SantaCon pub crawl originated in San Francisco in 1994 and has since spread to 300 cities in 44 countries, including New York City. London, Vancouver, Belfast and Moscow. The New York SantaCon is the largest, with an estimated 30,000 people participating in 2012. Other events were much smaller and more subdued, with 30 participating in Spokane, Washington.

In New York City, where it has taken place since 1997, it has come under widespread criticism for rowdiness by participants, with drunken behavior that has disrupted parts of Manhattan and Brooklyn, and led to calls for the event to be ended and for participant misbehavior to be curbed. Former Police Commissioner Raymond Kelly said that despite "some rowdy actions by a small handful of people in the past," SantaCon was "an event that we support. It's what makes New York New York." During the New York City SantaCon in 2012, participants "left a trail of trouble" through Hell's Kitchen, Midtown Manhattan, the East Village and Williamsburg. Residents complained revelers vomited and urinated in the street and fought with each other.

In London, the London Santa Pub Crawl has been held each December since 2004. The event sees participants dress up as Santa Claus, and visit a selection of London pubs along a pre-planned route. From just 25 participants in its first year, the event now sees more than 300 Santas take to the streets to enjoy the festivities. Participants are asked to donate to support the event's nominated charity, and more than £5,000 has been raised over the years for the British Red Cross and St Christopher's Hospice. The 2014 London Santa Pub Crawl took place on Saturday 13 December 2014.

In Brisbane, Australia, the Christmas Pub Crawl runs each year on the first Saturday following the end of the school year in December. This event has been running annually since 1982 and is now "the world's longest running pub crawl". Santa-themed pub crawls also take place each December in the towns of Wollongong and Grafton, with proceeds donated to charity. In 2015 local police announced cancellation of the Grafton event, but were opposed by the mayor.

== See also ==
- Drinking culture
- Groundhopping
- Index of drinking establishment–related articles
- Organ crawl
- Pub golf
- Rail Ale Ramble
- SantaCon
- Zombie Pub Crawl
