= Glatter =

Glatter is a surname. Notable people with the surname include:

- Lesli Linka Glatter (born 1953), American film and television director
- Pete Glatter (1949–2008), British Russia analyst
