= 1919 Edinburgh Corporation election =

Local election in Scotland

An Election to the Edinburgh Corporation was held on 3 November 1919, alongside municipal elections across Scotland.

== Aggregate results ==
Edinburgh Corporation election, 1919
Party	Seats	Gains	Losses	Net gain/loss	Seats %	Votes %	Votes	+/−
Liberal	7							
Unionist	5							
Labour	1							
EWCA	1	1	0	▲1			2,396	
Independent	0							
B.S.I.S.L.P.	0							

== Ward results ==
=== Canongate ===
Canongate
Party	Candidate	Votes	%	±%
Unionist	R. Bathgate*	2,338		
Liberal	Peter Harvey Allan	1,638		
Labour	J. Campbell	1509		
Liberal	J. Stewart	1334		
Ind. Socialist	G. Milne	155		
Majority				
Turnout			40.3	
Unionist hold		Swing		
Liberal hold		Swing		

=== Merchiston ===
Merchiston
Party	Candidate	Votes	%	±%
EWCA	Mrs Euphemia Somerville	2396		
Unionist	A. B. Stewart	1241		
Majority		1155		
Turnout			31.2	
WCA gain from				
