= Communist League (UK, 1932) =

- Leader: Harry Wicks
- Founded: 1932
- Dissolved: 1938
- Split from: Communist Party of Great Britain
- Merged into: Revolutionary Socialist League
- Headquarters: Balham
- Ideology: Trotskyism
- Political position: Far-left
- National affiliation: Labour Party (1936-1938)
- International affiliation: International Left Opposition

The Communist League was one of the first Trotskyist groups in Britain, formed in 1932 by members of the Communist Party of Great Britain in South London, including Harry Wicks, who had been expelled after forming a loose grouping inside the CPGB known as the Balham Group. This became the British Section of the International Left Opposition and adopted the name Communist League in June 1933. They published a monthly newspaper, Red Flag, and a quarterly journal, The Communist.

In 1933, Leon Trotsky suggested the group should enter the Independent Labour Party, but the leadership decided against, leading to a split that December. In 1934, a small group led by Denzil Dean Harber did enter the ILP, as the Bolshevik-Leninist Fraction, and formed the core of the Marxist Group which C. L. R. James joined. Slow progress led to more splits, with the formation of the entrist Bolshevik-Leninist Group in the Labour Party, the core of the later Militant Group.

The Communist League dissolved in 1936 and its members entered the Labour Party as the Marxist League (not to be confused with the earlier, unconnected Marxist League aka Marxian League of FA Ridley and Hugo Dewar), led by Harry Wicks. Wicks began working closely with James, by then leader of the Marxist Group, and in 1938 the two merged to form the Revolutionary Socialist League, into which the Militant Group (now Militant Labour League) merged the same year.
