= 1920 Edinburgh Corporation election =

Local election in Scotland

An Election to the Edinburgh Corporation was held on 2 November 1920, alongside municipal elections across Scotland. The election was the first following the absorption of Leith and parts of the Edinburgh suburbs into Edinburgh Corporation. The area previously comprising Edinburgh Corporation continued to return 50 members, and Leith returned 12, and the new suburbs 9. The new Edinburgh Corporation therefore had a total of 71 members. There were contests in 12 of the 16 wards, and the election saw Labours total representation for Edinburgh & Leith reduced from 7 to 4.

== Aggregate results ==
Edinburgh Corporation election, 1920
Party	Seats	Gains	Losses	Net gain/loss	Seats %	Votes %	Votes	+/−
Progressives	32							
Labour	3							
Independent	0							
B.S.I.S.L.P.	0							

== Ward results ==
Haymarket 1 Vacancy
Party	Candidate	Votes	%	±%
	Thomas B. Whitson (incumbent)	2,083		
Labour	Alex Wilkie	1,872		

St Andrews 1 Vacancy
Party	Candidate	Votes	%	±%
	J. D. Philips Smith	1,327		
	R. C. Nesbit	549		
	R. M. Cameron	365		

Canongate 1 Vacancy
Party	Candidate	Votes	%	±%
	Charles J. M. Mannor	1,566		
Labour	James Campbell	1,499		
	John Banks	365		
B.S.I.S.L.P.	Thomas Jeffrey	52		

Colinton 3 Vacancies
Party	Candidate	Votes	%	±%
	Robert A. Speirs	944		
	Joe R. Milne	707		
	John McCormack	566		
	Angus M. Gregorson	565		

St Bernard 1 Vacancy
Party	Candidate	Votes	%	±%
	T. W. Nelson	1,664		
	J. P. Jopp	1,578		
Labour	R. Mannon	486		

South Leith 3 Vacancies
Party	Candidate	Votes	%	±%
Progressives	W.F. Harris	4,140		
Progressives	J.P. Goalen (incumbent)	3,805		
Progressives	L.S. Gumley (incumbent)	3,324		
Labour	G. Hogg	1,748		
Labour	Ian Couper	1,330		
Progressives	J.W. Harrower	1,317		
Labour	Bernie Johnston	157		
B.S.I.S.L.P.	T. Tait	123		
B.S.I.S.L.P.	G. M. H. Milne	93		
Majority				
Turnout		16,037		
Progressives hold		Swing		
Progressives hold		Swing		
Progressives gain from Labour		Swing		
