= Adjusted Service Rating Score =

Repatriation criteria used by US Army

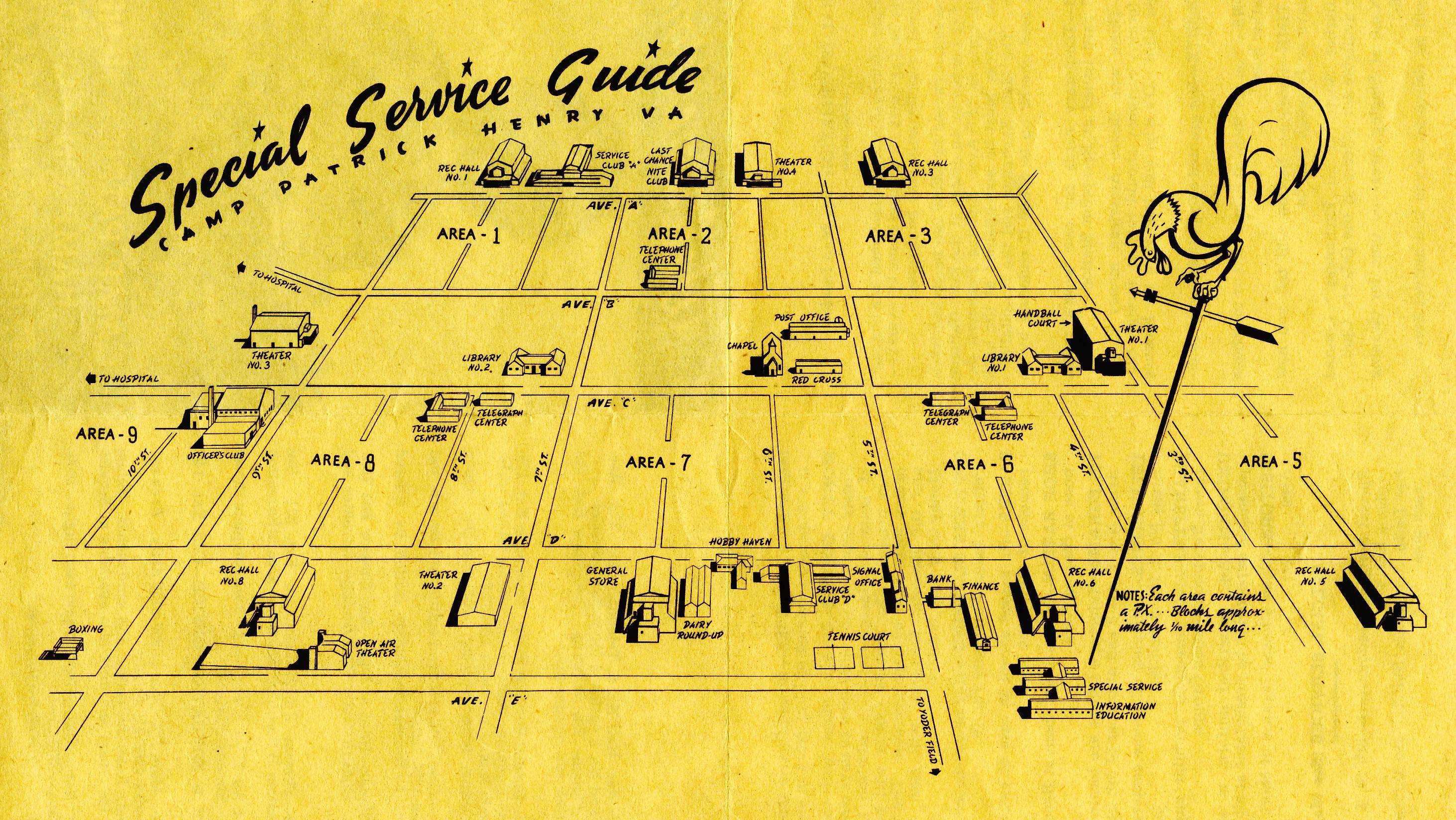
A soldier's 1944–45 Welcome Home Guide to Camp Patrick Henry, Virginia.

The Adjusted Service Rating Score was the system that the United States Army used at the end of World War II in Europe to determine which soldiers were eligible to be repatriated to the United States for discharge from military service as part of Operation Magic Carpet. This system was referred to as "The Point System" by U.S. soldiers.

== History ==
As the end of the war in Europe became a reality, the US War Department began planning for the redeployment of Army personnel following the end of hostilities. The Veterans Replacement and Release Act of 1945 established the US Army Point System. The Readjustment Regulations were first introduced on September 15, 1944. It was much debated and revised on February 15, 1945; March 5, 1945; October 24, 1945; September 8, 1945.

The rules were simple in general principle: "those who had fought longest and hardest should be returned home for discharge first." The US Army divided units of the European Theater of Operations into four categories:

1. Units designated as occupation forces (such as the Third and the Seventh Armies)
2. Units that had been overseas for less than one year, or those: (a) to be redeployed directly to the Pacific; (b) to be redeployed to the Pacific via the United States; (c) to be returned to the United States to be placed in strategic reserve.
3. Units to be organized or reorganized in the European Theater for use as occupation forces, or to be redeployed to the Pacific Theater of Operations.
4. Units to be returned to the United States and inactivated or disbanded.

New troops would be deployed to Europe as replacements for the veterans returning home.

== Initial criteria ==
Initially, an enlisted man needed a score of 85 points to be considered for demobilization. The scores were determined as follows:

1. Month in service = 1 point each
2. Month in service overseas = 1 point each, in addition to month in service
3. Combat award (Medal of Honor, Distinguished Service Cross, Distinguished Service Medal, Legion of Merit, Silver Star Medal, Distinguished Flying Cross, Soldier's Medal, Bronze Star Medal, Air Medal, Purple Heart) or campaign participation star = 5 points each
4. Dependent child under eighteen years old (up to 3) = 12 points each

Time of service was calculated from September 16, 1940. The four criteria were the only ones from which points were calculated. Soldiers who met the most score requirements took precedence, especially if they had dependents. No points were issued for age, marriage, or dependent children over the age of eighteen. Battles and awards were also only accepted from a predetermined list. Some individuals were required to remain overseas longer even if they met the point threshold. These individuals had special skills that were needed. Staying six months longer was the intended cap for these individuals.

== Classes ==
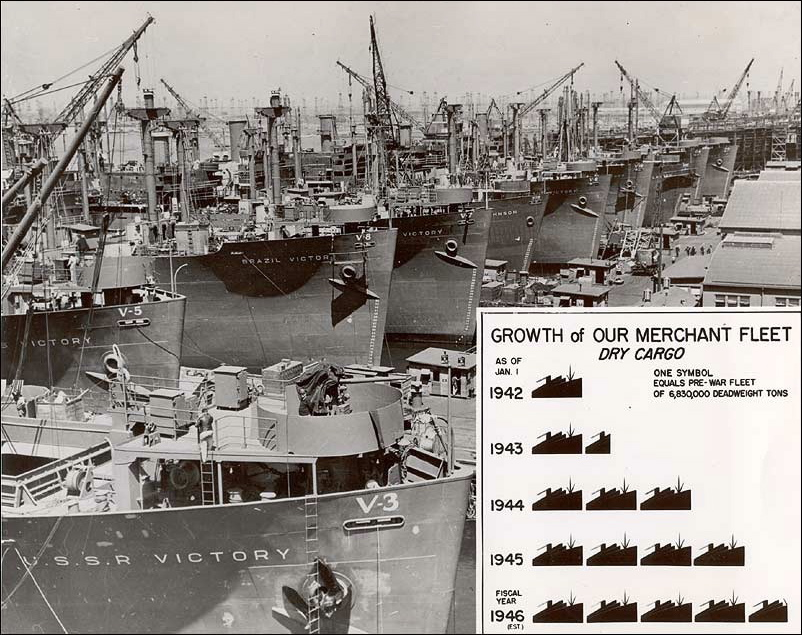
Victory ships that would be used by the U.S. War Shipping Administration to transfer men and equipment from Europe to the Far East in May 1945.

Different scores were set for troops in the US Army, US Army Air Forces, Women’s Army Corps and holders of the Medal of Honor.

=== Officers ===
Before the surrender of Japan, officers who may have had to serve again in combat were assessed not only on their ASR score but also on their efficiency and military specialties. Most high-scoring officers could have expected an early discharge after VE Day. The qualifying score was revised down to 80 points after VJ Day. In the coming months it would be lowered again.

=== Medical personnel ===
Scores varied before the end of May 1945 by varied department in the Medical Corps.

- Medical Administrative Corps (MAC) = 88 points
- Medical Corps (MC) = 85 points (plus specialty)
- Nurses Corps = 71 points
- Physical Therapists = 65 points
- Hygienists and Dietitians = 62 points

The discharge program continued until the end of July 1945; the demand to ship personnel and equipment to the Pacific became so great that medical units were prevented from shipping back to the United States for inactivation. However, all transfers to the Pacific were abruptly halted with announcement of the Japanese surrender on August 14, 1945.

== Post-war changes ==
The day after the Nagasaki bomb on 9 August 1945, General George C. Marshall told Dwight D. Eisenhower to prepare to modify the scoring system as soon as Japan surrendered. When Eisenhower asked for a month, Marshall told him that public opinion at home to end the Selective Service System was such that a month's delay before large numbers of soldiers returned home would be very difficult. On 15 August Eisenhower was ordered to make the changes immediately, ship 1,716,000 men by the end of January 1946, and expect to not have any men with scores above 45 in the European Theater of Operations after 1 April 1946.

By September 1945, the War Department redesignated all units in Europe as either redeployment forces (those with the highest score being sent back to the United States), liquidation forces (troops with middle scores of 60–79 points) who were required to close down former frontline facilities such as munition dumps or field hospitals, or occupation forces (personnel with either the lowest scores or who were volunteers).

Nevertheless, the ASR began to create problems for the US Army in post-war Germany as high-scoring personnel plus the attrition caused by sickness, compassionate leave and accidents meant continual loss of many experienced officers and NCOs.

Other issues arose with the changing of discharge point thresholds which is outlined below. Overload of transportation back to the United States resulted in protests in Manila, France, and London.

By December 1, 1945, a new policy was started, which was based on a combination of ASR score and length of service. The points required were as follows:

- Officers (excluding Medical Department & WAC) = 70 and four years of military service
- Women's Army Corps officers = 37 points
- Medical Department officers = 55 points
- All enlisted men = 50 and four years of military service
- All enlisted women = 32 points

All enlisted fathers with three or more dependent children under 18 years of age were immediately eligible for discharge irrespective of their time in military service.

== See also ==
- End of World War II in Europe
- Allied-occupied Germany
- Post–World War II demobilization strikes
- Aftermath of World War II
- Demobilization of the British Armed Forces after World War II
- Demobilization of United States armed forces after World War II
