= Haston =

Haston may refer to:

- Dougal Haston (1940–1977), British mountaineer
- Jock Haston (1913–1986), British Trotskyist politician
- Kirk Haston (born 1979), American basketball player
