= Militant (disambiguation) =

Militant means vigorously active, combative and aggressive, especially in support of a cause.

Militant may also refer to:

- The Militant, an international socialist news magazine, published since 1928
- Militant (Trotskyist group), commonly called the Militant tendency, and its newspaper Militant, published since 1964
- The Militants, or Militant faction, an organized grouping in the Socialist Party of America during the 1930s
- Militant Group, a British Trotskyist group of the 1930s, and their journal Militant from 1937

== See also ==
- Church Militant
