= Revolutionary Communist League (UK) =

- Abbreviation: RCL
- Founded: 1970
- Dissolved: c. 1980 (split into factions)
- Preceded by: IMG split-off; Militant splinter
- Succeeded by: Labour Briefing (minority faction)
- Newspaper: Chartist, London Labour Briefing
- Ideology: Trotskyism, Entryism
- Political position: Far-left
- National affiliation: Labour Party (Entryist)
- Politics of United Kingdom; Political parties; Elections; Popularly known as "The Chartists"

The Revolutionary Communist League was a small Trotskyist group in Britain. It was founded in 1970 from the merger of two small groups, one a split-off from the International Marxist Group who had failed to persuade their group to turn away from student politics in favour of the trade unions and entryism in the Labour Party; the other an even smaller splinter from the Militant.

The merged group promoted the Socialist Charter initiative of Tribunite Labour MPs which published the Chartist paper, and were consequently nicknamed the Chartists. They took over this initiative, and based their work around the Charter on a conception of transitional politics taken from Leon Trotsky. They were also active around The Soldiers' Charter, an attempt to influence the armed forces.

By 1973, a majority of the group were moving to the right. A split developed and the Right of the group kept the journal, which developed a politics influenced by Euro-Communism and were close to the Labour Co-ordinating Committee.

In late 1980, the Chartist minority faction around figures such as Graham Bash, Chris Knight and Keith Veness founded the journal London Labour Briefing, helping provide a supportive network within the Labour Party in London for left-wing figures such as Ken Livingstone, Diane Abbott and Jeremy Corbyn.
