= Demobilization of United States Armed Forces after World War II =

1945-1947 reduction of U.S. military headcount from 12.2 million to 1.5 million

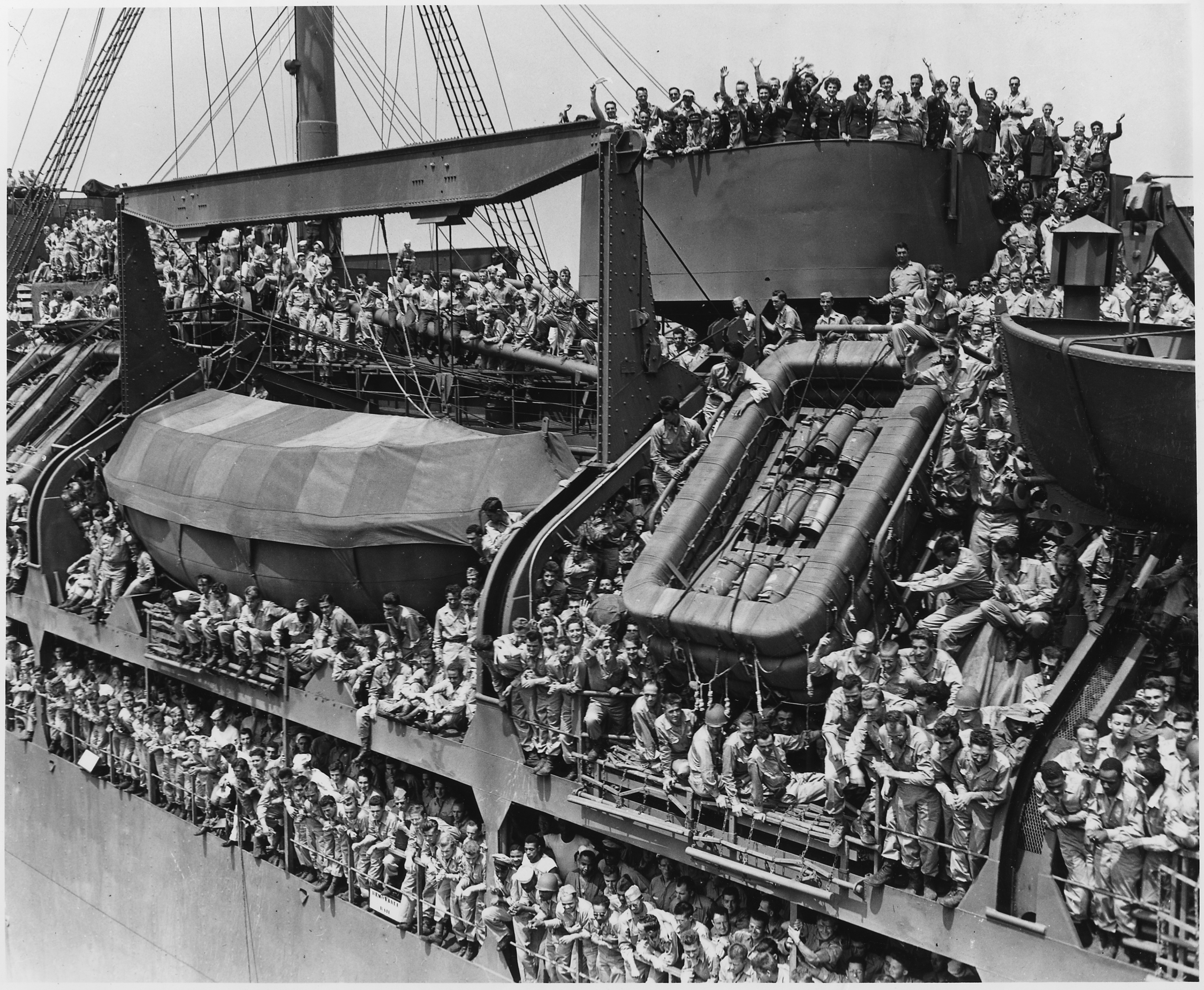
US troops returning home aboard the USS General Harry Taylor in August 1945

The demobilization of United States Armed Forces after World War II began with the defeat of Germany in May 1945 and continued through 1946. The United States had more than 12 million men and women in the armed forces at the end of World War II, of whom 7.6 million were stationed abroad. The American public demanded a rapid demobilization and soldiers protested the slowness of the process. Military personnel were returned to the United States in Operation Magic Carpet based on an eligibility points system known as the Adjusted Service Rating Score. By June 30, 1947, the number of active duty soldiers, sailors, Marines, and airmen in the armed forces had been reduced to 1,566,000.

== Overseas service personnel ==
In 1945, as the defeat of Germany and Japan neared, US military personnel numbered 12,209,238 divided among the services as follows:

Number of military personnel in 1945
Army	5,867,958
Army Air Forces	2,400,000
Navy	3,380,817
Marines	474,680
Coast Guard	85,783
Total	12,209,238

This total represented wartime expansion of the US military from the 334,000 it had been in 1939. 100,000 men were being drafted per month to replace soldiers in the army who were killed, wounded, and injured or who were discharged for medical problems. ("Uniformed military personnel" will often be referred to collectively as "soldiers" in this article, unless the context requires more specification.)

== Planning ==
As early as mid-1943, the United States Army recognized that once victory was achieved, bringing the troops home would be a priority. US soldiers were scattered across 55 theaters of war worldwide. Army Chief of Staff General George Marshall established committees to address the logistical problem. Eventually, organization of the operation was given to the War Shipping Administration (WSA). It established and coordinated Operation Magic Carpet.

== End of the war in Europe ==
On May 10, 1945, two days after the unconditional surrender of Germany to the Allies on V-E Day, the War Department announced a point system for the demobilization and discharge of Army and Army Air Force enlisted personnel. The point system, called the Adjusted Service Rating Score, had the objective of achieving equity in the demobilization. Soldiers were given one point for each month of military service and one additional point was given for each month of overseas service. Each battle star or decoration earned a soldier 5 points. Soldiers were awarded 12 points per dependent child up to a maximum of three children. Initially, a total of 85 points was needed for eligibility. Soldiers who had earned that number of points were to be demobilized as soon as transport back to the United States was available. Women in the Women's Army Corps (WACs) were eligible for demobilization with 44 points.

The War Department initially projected demobilizing 2 million soldiers in the 12 months following the victory in Europe: 50 percent of this total were in Europe, 33 percent in the Pacific, and 17 percent had already returned to the US after an overseas assignment. The Navy, including the Marine Corps, postponed demobilization until the defeat of Japan. The great majority of Navy and Marine Corps personnel were located in the Pacific region. Some soldiers in designated specialties were declared ineligible for demobilization despite having accumulated 85 points. Officers were not initially included in the point system for demobilization.

== Initial demobilizations ==
On V-E day, three million American military personnel were in Europe. Even the best were exhausted; when General Maxwell Taylor asked the elite 101st Airborne "We've licked the best that Hitler had in France and Holland and Germany. Now where do we want to go?", the soldiers shouted "Home". Additional replacement soldiers were in the pipeline to be assigned to Europe although overall force levels had been declining for several months as the war wound down. Army and Army Air Force units in Europe were classified into four categories for the purpose of occupation, redeployment, or demobilization.

Category I consisted of units to remain in Europe. The occupying force for Germany would consist of eight divisions and a total occupying force of 337,000 personnel to be reduced further in June 1946.

Category II consisted of units to be re-deployed to the Pacific. About one million soldiers were slated to be sent to the Pacific, including 13 infantry and 2 armored divisions. 400,000 soldiers were to go directly from Europe to the Pacific to arrive between September 1945 and January 1946; another 400,000 were to undergo eight weeks of retraining in the United States and continue to the Pacific to arrive by April 1946. About 200,000 Air Force personnel were to go to the Pacific, either from Europe or the United States.

Category III units were to be reorganized and retrained before being reclassified into Category I or II.

Category IV units were to be returned to the US to be inactivated or disbanded and personnel discharged. Category IV units consisted of soldiers who qualified for discharge under the point system. The total number of soldiers in Europe to be discharged was planned to be 2.25 million between the end of the war in Europe and December 1946.

As departures of soldiers from Europe was to be by units, a massive reshuffling of personnel took place to get soldiers eligible for demobilization into units designated for return to the US and deactivation. Turnover of personnel in one typical unit, the 28th Infantry Division, was 20 percent for enlisted men in one week and 46 percent for officers in 40 days. This impacted efficiency and unit cohesion.

The demobilization proceeded rapidly. Assembly areas to accommodate 310,000 soldiers were established in France. The soldiers lived in tent cities while waiting for transport back to the United States. In May 1945, 90,000 soldiers were repatriated, but others would have to wait months for transport as the war in the Pacific had first priority for ships and aircraft. Elaborate schemes of education and travel were attempted by the military to maintain morale during the waiting period. Upon arrival in the US, soldiers would undergo final out-processing at a number of designated military bases.

== Defeat of Japan ==
When Japan surrendered on September 2, 1945, the demand for rapid demobilization from soldiers, their families, and Congress became unstoppable and all previous plans became moot. Conscription was reduced to 50,000 men per month, less than the military's requirements for replacements. Soldiers, sailors, and marines in the Pacific became eligible for demobilization. The points required for demobilization were reduced several times, reaching 50 points on December 19, 1945. Ten aircraft carriers, 26 cruisers, and six battleships were converted into troopships to bring soldiers home from Europe and the Pacific. Racial segregation on the troop ships created a problem. In December 1945, the Navy barred 123 African-American soldiers from sailing home because they could "not be segregated" on a troop ship.

The War Department promised that all servicemen eligible for demobilization from Europe would be in the US by February 1946 and from the Pacific by June 1946. One million men were discharged from the military in December 1945. Every congressman was "under constant and terrific pressure from servicemen and their families" to discharge soldiers more rapidly.

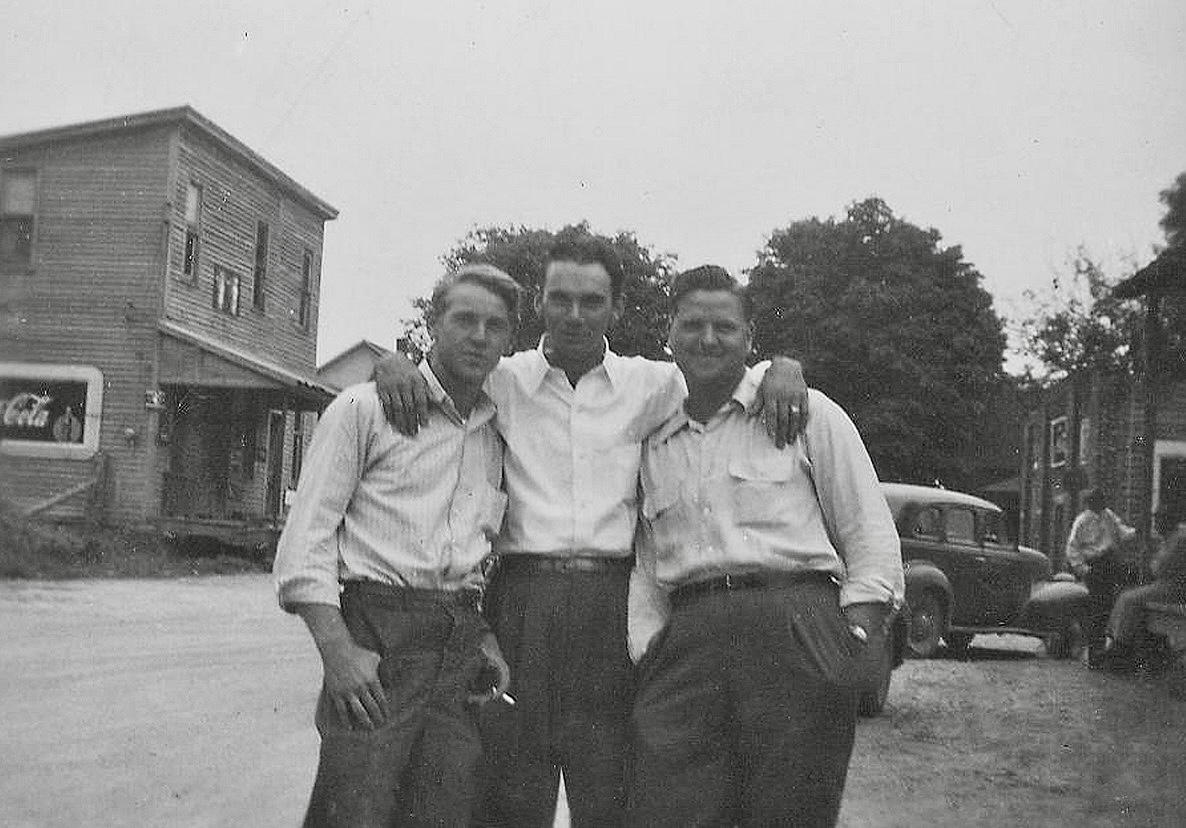
Three veteran buddies home from the war: Rex Arterburn (Navy), Quentin Pare (Army Air Forces), Guy Cross (Navy), photographed Flippin, Kentucky c. 1945

== Troop protests ==
By mid-September 1945, the number of American troops being sent back to the United States threatened to create a shortage of manpower for occupation duties in Germany, Austria, and Japan. On January 4, 1946, the War Department backtracked on its previous promises of early demobilization and announced that 1.55 million eligible servicemen would be demobilized and discharged over a six-month period rather than in three months as previously announced. This announcement generated immediate protests from soldiers around the world. Four thousand soldiers in Manila had demonstrated against the cancellation of a repatriation ship on Christmas 1945. On January 6, 20,000 marched on army headquarters. The protests spread worldwide, involving tens of thousands of soldiers in Guam, Japan, France, Germany, Austria, India, Korea, the United States, and England – where 500 disgruntled soldiers confronted Eleanor Roosevelt. Although a few soldiers were arrested, most commanders took a tolerant approach to the demonstrations. Communist involvement in the demonstrations was alleged, but unproven.

In Washington, Army Chief of Staff General Eisenhower ordered an investigation of the Manila demonstration and concluded that the main cause was "acute homesickness" and recommended that "no mass disciplinary action be taken" against the demonstrators. The military sped up demobilization by liberalizing the point system once again to further speed up demobilization, although Eisenhower banned any further demonstrations and threatened courts-martial for participants. The military also took steps to make service abroad more appealing. Basic training for new soldiers was shortened from 17 to 8 weeks. The army offered free travel to families of servicemen if the soldier agreed to remain overseas for two years. Occupation troops in Europe were offered a 17-day European tour for the nominal price of between 25 and 35 dollars (roughly $410 to $580 in 2025).

Post-war re-evaluation of Operation Magic Carpet by the US military, concluded it left the military understaffed to accomplish its responsibilities. In addition, the number of conscripts being drafted into the army was smaller than those needed to replace demobilized soldiers. The unpopular draft was terminated on March 31, 1947, and the US military became an all-volunteer force until new legislation authorizing a draft was adopted in 1948.

The number of personnel in the US military between mid-1945 and mid-1947 was reduced almost 90 percent, from more than 12 million to about 1.5 million.

Number of military personnel on June 30, 1947
Army (ground troops)	684,000
Army Air Force	306,000
Navy	484,000
Marines	92,000
Total	1,566,000

The rapid demobilization of the US military after World War II, in the words of one scholar, reduced the army "to a state of near impotency, weakened the prestige of our national policy, and endangered the security of the Nation." Another problem was untrained soldiers and officers replacing occupation forces. The United States Constabulary reported in March 1946 that Americans were the largest cause of trouble in the American zone.

Although the combat capability of the US certainly declined because of the demobilization, another assessment of the US military in Germany concluded that the army still had defensive capability and the "ability to perform occupational duties, to control the German population, and to suppress local uprisings". The occupation of Japan proved also to be relatively unchallenging. A new (and highly unpopular) Selective Service Act of 1948 restored conscription as a response to challenges by the Soviet Union in Greece and Berlin. US military forces remained at a level of about 1.5 million personnel until the Korean War in 1950.

== See also ==
- Adjusted Service Rating Score
- Demobilization
- Demobilisation of the Australian military after World War II
- Demobilisation of the British Armed Forces after the Second World War
- Greatest Generation, people born from 1901 to 1927
- Post-World War II demobilization strikes
