= 1945 Neath by-election =

Parliamentary by-election in South Wales

The 1945 Neath by-election was a parliamentary by-election held for the British House of Commons constituency of Neath in South Wales.

Neath was considered a safe seat for the Labour Party and had been held by William Jenkins since the 1922 general election. No other candidate had stood in the seat at the last general election. Jenkins died on 8 December 1944, but as World War II was still underway, the process of calling a by-election was slow, and the date was ultimately set as 15 May 1945.

== Candidates ==
The Labour Party expected to easily hold the seat, and stood local miner D. J. Williams. Williams was a member of Pontardawe Rural District Council, and the Executive Council of the South Wales Miners' Federation. He had been part of a miners' delegation to the Soviet Union and was known for his opposition to Welsh nationalism. Williams was supported by Will Lawther, President of the National Union of Mineworkers, which sponsored his candidature.

There was a truce between the major parties: Labour, the Conservative Party, the Liberal Party and the Liberal National Party. The Communist Party of Great Britain (CPGB), which had considerable strength in South Wales, was not a signatory to the pact, but had undertaken not to contest seats held by the major parties. As a result, the only opposition in by-elections came from independents, minor parties and occasional unofficial party candidates aligned with major parties.

Plaid Cymru stood Wynne Samuel, its South Wales organiser. The party's main strengths were in North Wales, and he was not expected to be a strong contender, but the party hoped this would launch a new strategy of winning over industrial workers in the south of the nation.

The Trotskyist Revolutionary Communist Party (RCP) stood Jock Haston, its General Secretary. This was the first time any Trotskyist organisation had stood a candidate in a British Parliamentary election. The party had only been established the previous year, and Trotskyism had not previously had a base in South Wales. The RCP had been leading supporters of strikes by coal miners in the area in 1944, for which some of its members had been imprisoned. Several local miners' lodges had supported their defence, and the RCP had sent a prominent member, John Lawrence, as a full-time organiser for the area, recruiting some activists in Merthyr Tydfil, Llanelli and Swansea. The party stood on a revolutionary internationalist platform, declaring, "Our candidate will fight on a platform of uncompromising hostility to the imperialist war, for the breaking of the Coalition, for the overthrow of the Churchill Government and for Labour to take power on a Socialist platform." Their main slogan was "Break the Coalition, Labour to Power".

== Campaign ==
The Communist Party offered its full support to the Labour candidate and campaigned against the RCP, using the slogan "A Vote for Haston is a Vote for Hitler". Williams repudiated the Communist support, opposing its policy of a popular front with the Conservatives and Labour after the war.

After repeated requests from the RCP, the CPGB agreed to hold a debate in Neath, putting up Alun Thomas, leader of the Communist Party in West Wales, against Haston. The meeting attracted about 1,500 voters, who heard Thomas claim that "In Russia they defeated fascism because they shot all the Trotskyists and the Fifth column scum, and if we had our way, these people on this platform would be shot."

The local Independent Labour Party was small, and was split as to how to respond to the election. Two of their local activists campaigned for and subsequently joined the RCP.

In the final week of the campaign, the war in Europe concluded and VE Day was observed, overshadowing the by-election. Although it was apparent that Labour would not agree to continue the coalition and would compel Churchill to call a general election, the Western Mail called on all Conservative and Liberal supporters to vote for Williams.

== Result ==
Williams retained the seat for Labour with a large majority, and held it until his retirement at the 1964 general election. Samuel retained his deposit in a distant second place. Haston took only 1,781 votes, losing his deposit, but the RCP claimed the campaign a success and maintained a full-time organiser in the area. Haston remained on good terms with Williams, and when the RCP disintegrated in 1950, Williams assisted him in finding employment with the National Council of Labour Colleges.

1945 Neath by-election
Party	Candidate	Votes	%	±%
Labour	D. J. Williams	30,847	79.3	N/A
Plaid Cymru	Wynne Samuel	6,290	16.2	N/A
Revolutionary Communist	Jock Haston	1,781	4.6	N/A
Majority		24,557	63.1	N/A
Turnout		38,918	58.0	N/A
Registered electors		67,083		
Labour hold		Swing	N/A	
