= Operation Magic Carpet =

Repatriation of over eight million American military personnel after WWII

- Part of the aftermath of World War II
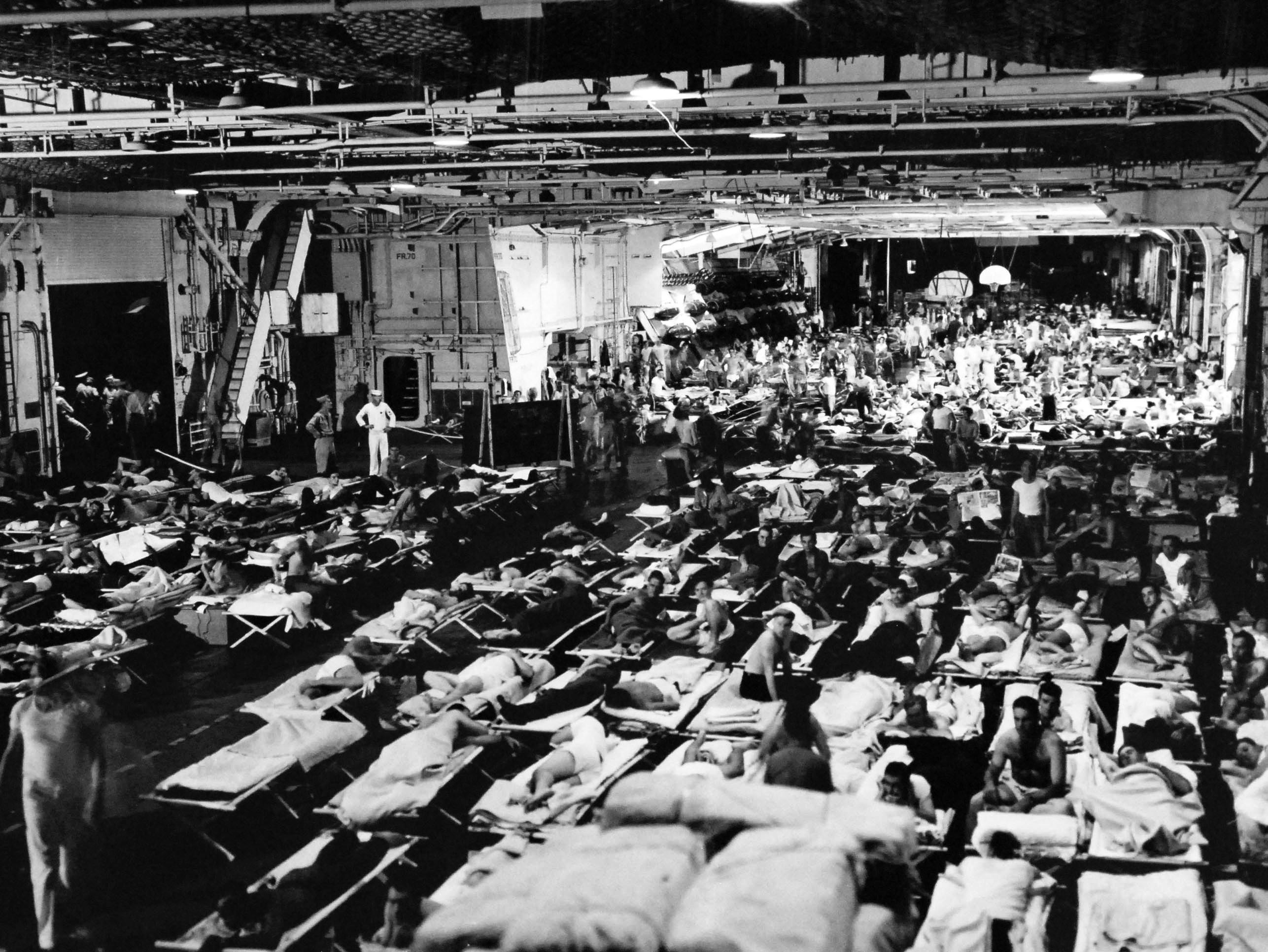
- Homeward bound GIs onboard the carrier USS Enterprise during Operation Magic Carpet
- Objective: Repatriation of American military personnel from Europe, Asia, and the Pacific
- Date: June 1945 – September 1946
- Executed by: United States
- Outcome: Successful operation

Operation Magic Carpet was the post–World War II operation by the U.S. War Shipping Administration (WSA) to repatriate over eight million American military personnel from the European (ETO), Pacific, and Asian theaters.

Hundreds of Liberty ships, Victory ships, and troop transports began repatriating soldiers from Europe to the United States in June 1945. Beginning in October 1945, over 370 United States Navy ships were used for repatriation duties in the Pacific. Warships, such as aircraft carriers, battleships, hospital ships, and large numbers of assault transports, were used. The European phase of Operation Magic Carpet concluded in February 1946; the Pacific phase continued until September 1946.

== Planning ==
As early as mid-1943, the United States Army had recognized that, once the war was over, bringing the troops home would be a priority. More than 16 million Americans were in uniform, and more than eight million of them were scattered across all theaters of war, worldwide. Army Chief of Staff General George Marshall established committees to address the logistical problems. Eventually, organization of the operation was given to the War Shipping Administration (WSA). Eligibility for repatriation was determined by the Adjusted Service Rating Score.

== Europe ==
United States Navy ships were excluded from the initial European sealift, as the Pacific War was far from over, and the task of returning the troops was the sole responsibility of the Army and Merchant Marine. The WSA ordered the immediate conversion of 300 Liberty and Victory cargo ships into transports. Adequate port and docking facilities were also serious considerations, along with the transportation necessary to deliver the veterans to demobilization camps after they reached America's shores.

There were 3,059,000 uniformed men and women in Europe, Africa, and the Mediterranean on 8 May 1945, also known as VE Day. The first homeward-bound ships left Europe in late June 1945, and by November, the sealift was at its height. Whereas American shipping had delivered an average of 148,000 soldiers per month to the European Theater of Operations (ETO) during the wartime build-up, the post–VE Day rush homeward reached a peak of 430,000 GIs per month and continued for 14 months.

In mid-October 1945, the Navy donated the newly commissioned carrier USS Lake Champlain—fitted with bunks for 3,300 troops—to the operation. She was joined in November by the battleship USS Washington. At that point, the European operation included more than 400 vessels. Some carried as few as 300 personnel, while large ocean liners often squeezed 15,000 aboard, comparable to the post-World War I troop transports. The U.S. obtained the use of one of the ocean liners, the British RMS Queen Mary, in exchange for ten Liberty Ships. The WSA and the Army also converted 29 troopships into special carriers for tens of thousands of war brides, European women who had married American servicemen. The Magic Carpet fleet also included 48 hospital ships; these transported more than half a million wounded. By the end of December 1945 the European Theater of Operations had 614,000 troops.

The operation was not, however, a one-way stream. Former Axis prisoners of war from Europe and Japan who had been held in the United States had to be repatriated, and Allied occupation forces had to be returned to Germany, China, Korea, and Japan. 450,000 German prisoners of war, in addition to 53,000 Italian ex-POWs, were returned to Europe. Between May and September 1945, 1,417,850 people were repatriated.

Between October 1945 to April 1946, 3,323,395 were repatriated. By the end of February, the European Theater phase of Magic Carpet was essentially completed.

== Asia and the Pacific ==
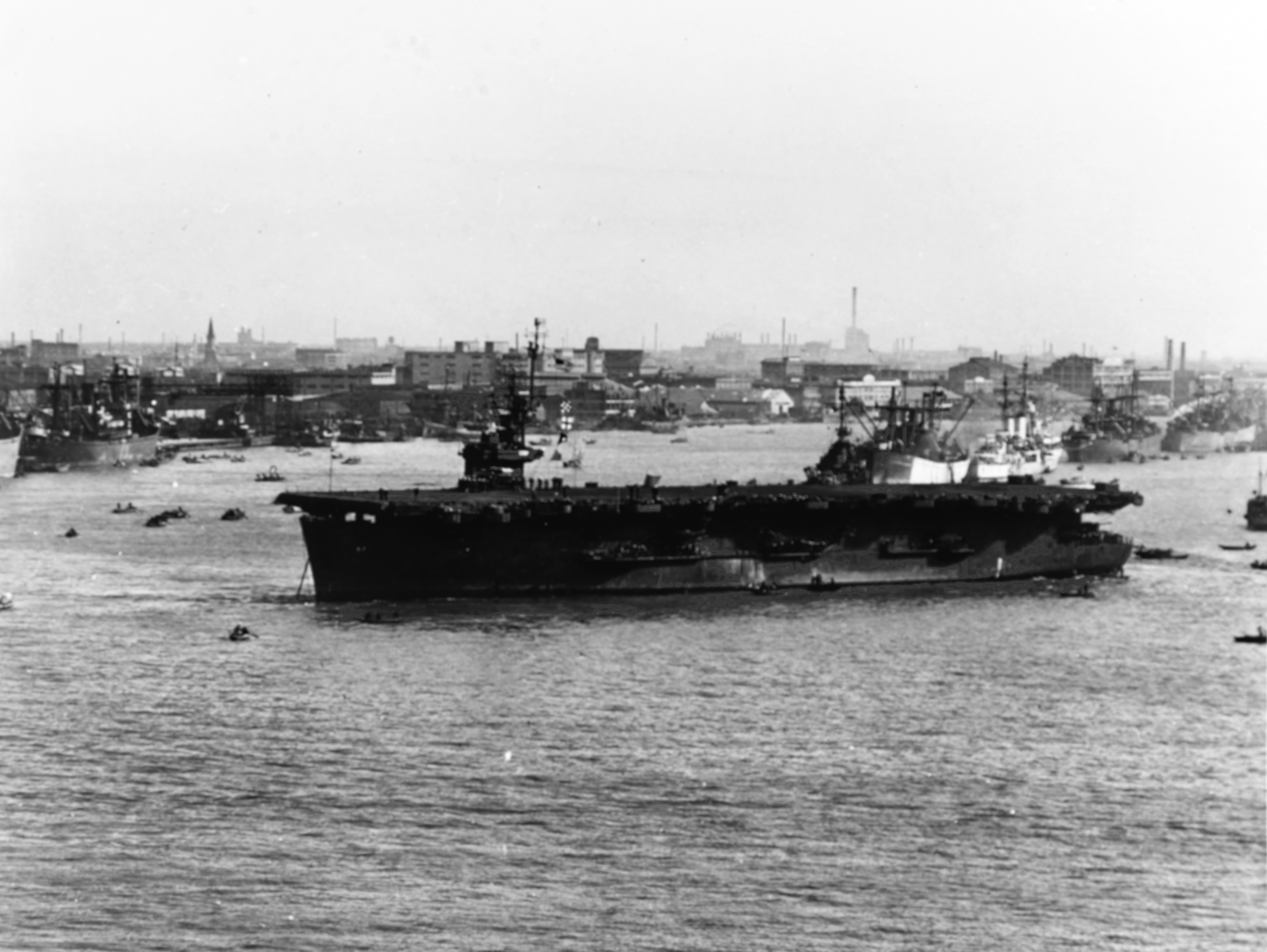
USS Anzio lying off Shanghai, China on 1 December 1945, during Operation Magic Carpet

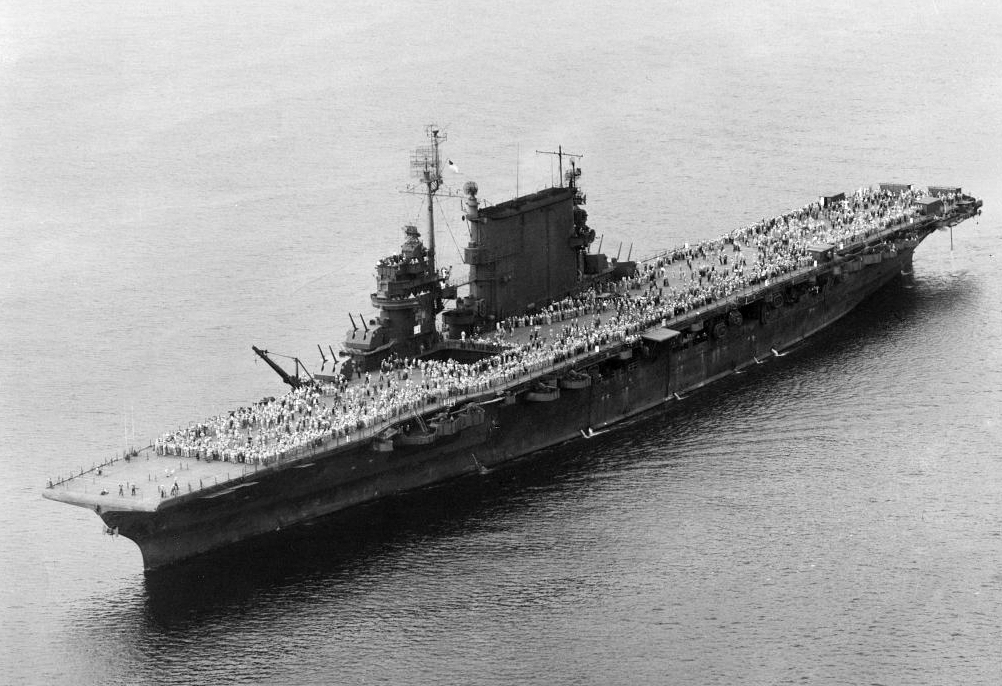
A total of 29,204 servicemen returned aboard USS Saratoga, more than on any other individual ship

With the surrender of Japan, the Navy also began bringing home sailors and Marines. Vice Admiral Forrest Sherman's Task Force 11 departed Tokyo Bay early in September 1945 with the battleships USS New Mexico, USS Idaho, USS Mississippi, and USS North Carolina, along with two carriers and a squadron of destroyers filled with homeward-bound servicemen. Stopping at Okinawa, they embarked thousands more Tenth United States Army troops.

The Navy hastily converted many of its warships into temporary transports. In some aircraft carriers, three- to five-tiered bunks were installed on the hangar decks to provide accommodation for several thousand men in relative comfort. The Navy fleet of 369 ships included 222 attack transports, 6 battleships, 18 cruisers, 57 aircraft carriers, and 12 hospital ships.

By October 1945, Magic Carpet was operating worldwide with the Army, Navy, and WSA pooling their resources to expedite the transportation of troops. December 1945 saw the highest monthly number of troops returning from the Pacific, at nearly 700,000. Twenty-nine troop transports carrying more than 200,000 soldiers, sailors, and Marines from the China–Burma–India theater arrived in the United States in April 1946. The last of the troops to return from the Pacific war zone (127,300) arrived home in September 1946.

== Airlift ==
The Army's Air Transport Command (ATC) and the navy's Naval Air Transport Service (NATS) were also involved in Magic Carpet operations, amassing millions of flying hours in transport and cargo aircraft, though the total number of personnel returned home by aircraft was minuscule in comparison to the numbers carried by ship.

== See also ==
- Demobilization of United States armed forces after World War II

== Notes ==
=== Bibliography ===
- Gault, Owen (September 2005). "Operation Magic Carpet". Sea Classics. Chatsworth: Challenge Publications. Archived from the original on 24 February 2007.
