= Karl Marx pub crawl =

Pub crawl based on those frequented by Karl Marx

- Venue: Various pubs around Soho
- Location: London; 51°30′46″N 0°7′52″W
- Type: Pub crawl
- Theme: Karl Marx

The Karl Marx pub crawl is the name for various organised pub crawls based around a series of public houses the communist philosopher Karl Marx was known to have frequented or, more speculatively, may have visited in London.

== Background ==
In his lifetime Marx is known to have enjoyed bouts of heavy drinking with friends. A particularly notable pub crawl took place in the 1850s involving Marx, Edgar Bauer and Wilhelm Liebknecht. The trio intended to imbibe at least one beer in every one of the 18 pubs on Tottenham Court Road between Oxford Street and Hampstead Road. According to an account later written by Liebknecht the group got into a mild altercation with a group of Odd Fellows, and committed acts of vandalism, before being chased by four policemen. In his memoir of Marx, Liebknecht explained the challenge of the pub crawl;

The problem was to “take something” in every saloon between Oxford Street and Hampstead Road – making the something a very difficult task, even by confining yourself to a minimum, considering the enormous number of saloons in that part of the city. But we went to work undaunted and managed to reach the end of Tottenham Court Road without accident.

== History ==
The first regular Marx themed pub crawl was organised by the historian Al Richardson from the late 1960s. Named the Karl Marx Memorial Pub Crawl, it was started as a fundraiser for the Vietnam Solidarity Campaign. Taking in pubs along a route from Marx's former residence in Soho to Hampstead Heath, where he regularly frequented for picnics, the participant who finished a drink in every pub along the way was awarded the door knocker of Vladimir Lenin's former residence in Clerkenwell.

== Organised crawls ==
A route for the Karl Marx pub crawl based on Liebknecht's account has been published in the book Londonist Drinks. The suggested route visits 6 pubs on Tottenham Court Road, and includes other Marx related sites nearby.

Various organised Karl Marx pub crawls take place in London, being particularly popular with students. The London branch of Socialist Students (Note: Socialist Students is the student wing of the Socialist Party) organises an annual Marx themed pub crawl which follows a route past his former residence, the site where he was commissioned to write The Communist Manifesto, and the Coach and Horses. Student groups from King's College London Students' Union have an organised Karl Marx pub crawl which visits pubs Marx was known to have drunk at such as the Museum Tavern, The Flask, the Red Lion, and the Crown Tavern, where Vladimir Lenin and Joseph Stalin first met. Students from Goldsmiths University participate in Karl Marx pub crawls beginning at the former Jack Straw's Castle pub, taking in the Red Lion, the Lord Southampton, and the Rising Sun, among others.

== Other sites ==
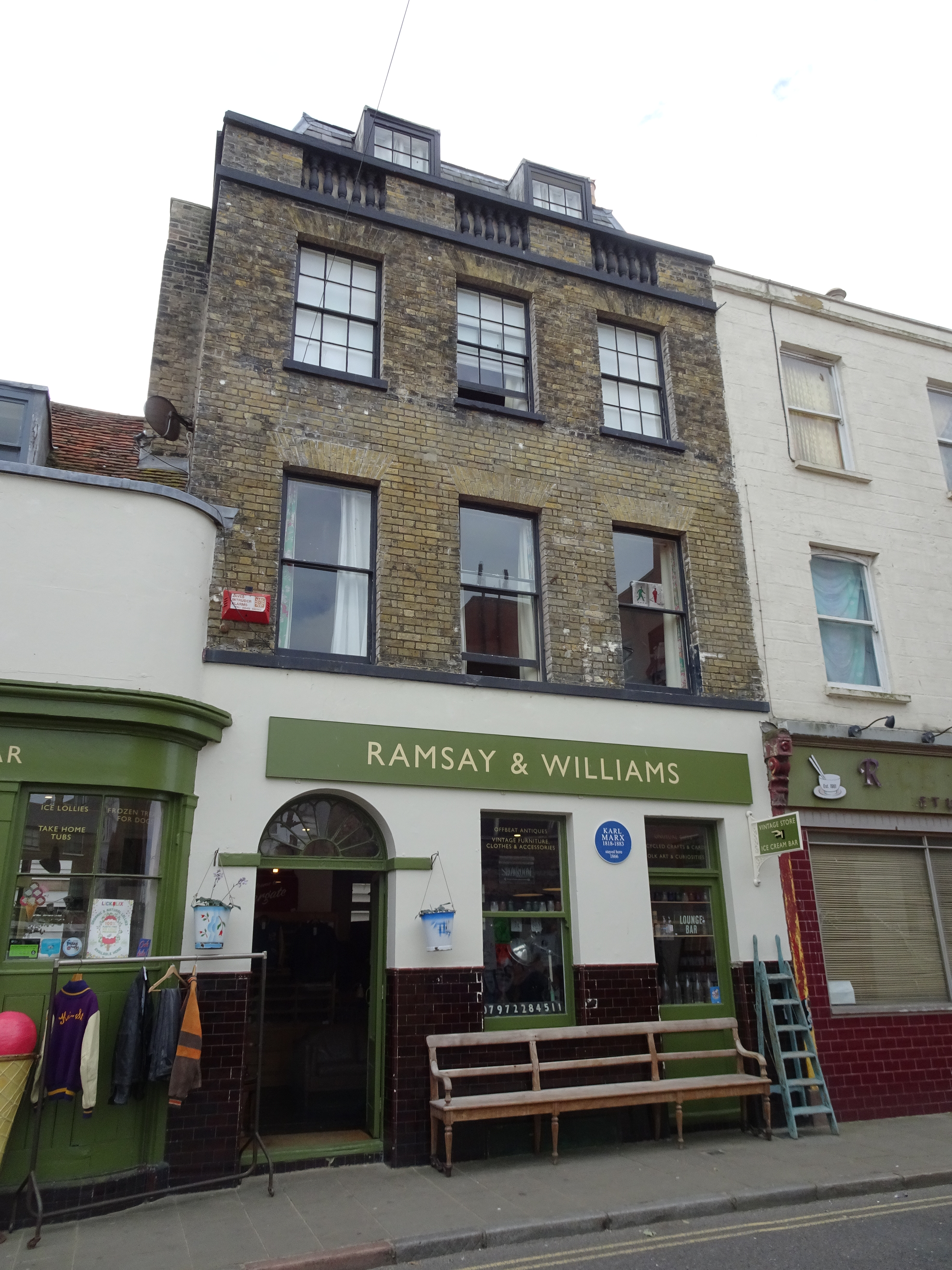
A public house in Margate with a plaque claiming that Marx visited it in 1866

Marx is reputed to have been a regular visitor to the Black Horse and Harrow pub in Catford, south-east London. Outside of London, the Red Dragon pub in Salford is believed to have been visited by Marx and Friedrich Engels. On the bicentenary of Marx's birth a pub crawl of establishments he was known to drink at was organised in Manchester.

== Interpretation ==
The popularity of Karl Marx pub crawls has been interpreted both as a psychogeographic exercise aimed at reconnecting to urban space, and as a social activity in reaction to the digital age.
