= Ian Birchall =

British Marxist historian and author

Ian Birchall (born 1939) is a British Marxist historian and translator, a former member of the Socialist Workers Party and author of numerous articles and books, particularly relating to the French Left. Formerly Senior Lecturer in French at Middlesex University, his research interests include the Comintern, the International Working Class, Communism and Trotskyism, France and Syndicalism, Babeuf, Sartre, Victor Serge and Alfred Rosmer. He was on the editorial board of Revolutionary History, a member of the London Socialist Historians Group and has completed a biography of Tony Cliff.

In 2013, Birchall joined opposition to the SWP Central Committee during the internal crisis over allegations of rape and resigned from the organisation in December.

In August 2015, Birchall was one of 20 authors of Poets for Corbyn, an anthology of poems endorsing Jeremy Corbyn's campaign in the Labour Party leadership election.

== Selected articles/works ==
- France : the struggle goes on (with Tony Cliff) (1968)
- Workers against the monolith : the Communist parties since 1943 (1974)
- The smallest mass party in the world : building the Socialist Workers Party, 1951-1979 (1981)
- Eric Hobsbawm and the working class (with Norah Carlin) (1983)
- Bailing out the system : reformist socialism in Western Europe, 1944-1985 (1986)
- Morris, Bax and Babeuf (1996)
- The spectre of Babeuf (1997)
- Sartre against Stalinism (2004)
- A Rebel's Guide to Lenin (2005)
- Sartre's Century (2005)
- Tony Cliff: A Marxist for His Time (2011)

=== Works translated/edited ===
- Lenin's Moscow, by Alfred Rosmer (translated from the French) (1971)
- Flowers and revolution : a collection of writings on Jean Genet (edited with Barbara Read)(1997)
- Witness to the German Revolution / by Victor Serge (translated from the French) (1999)
- The German Revolution, 1917-1923 / by Pierre Broué; translated by John Archer (edited with Brian Pearce) (2005)
- Revolution in Danger – Writings from Russia 1919-20 by Victor Serge (translated from the French) London: Redwords.(1997)
