= Cairo Forces Parliament =

Meeting of British soldiers in Cairo

The Cairo Forces Parliament was a meeting of British soldiers in Cairo, Egypt in February 1944 which voted for the nationalisation of banks, land, mines, and transport in the United Kingdom. Among those that took part was Leo Abse who later became a Labour MP. Another participant who later became a Labour MP was Henry Solomons, who was appointed the Labour 'Prime Minister' of the Cairo Forces Parliament.

Sam Bardell, a member of the Communist Party of Great Britain was secretary and the parliament attracted political activists from the Common Wealth Party and the Trotskyist movement.

The Parliament was eventually shut down because of the growing support for the revolutionary ideas promoted by members of the Workers' International League. Adopting the tactics of the Proletarian Military Policy, they were elected to the positions of Prime Minister and Home Secretary. Their revolutionary work was successful in winning the support of many soldiers, as described by Ted Grant,

"From the reports of our soldier comrades, the Eighth Army soldiers were saying that after the war they would refuse to disarm, and return to Britain with their guns to ensure that things would change. This was the mutinous mood that was developing amongst these troops. At the 1943 conference of our tendency, I made the point, to illustrate the thing graphically, that the military establishment though it their army, but in fact, the soldiers of the Eighth Army were in rebellion. This reflected the revolutionary developments in the army. It was our Eighth Army in that it was being transformed. It was becoming revolutionary and in the process of moving over to the side of the working class."

Similar parliaments also took place within the British Army in this period of the war. In the British Army in India such parliaments existed briefly at both Mhow and Deolali transit camp, and perhaps others. The Mhow parliament took place six months after the Cairo parliament, with 70-100 members and official blessing, although was soon shut down from above. The original structure of the Mhow parliament had a government and left wing opposition, but due to a larger number of left-wingers in the parliament the government dissolved and was replaced by the left party, with a centre and right opposition parties.

== See also ==
- Common Wealth Party
- Post–World War II demobilization strikes
- Putney Debates

== Bibliography ==
- Andy Baker, The Cairo Parliament, 1943-4: An Experiment in Military Democracy, Leigh on Sea, Essex : Partizan Press 1989
- Gilbert Hall, The Cairo Forces’ Parliament : the inside story, London : C. A. Smith, [ca. 1948].
- Jim Fyrth, An Indian Landscape 1944-1946, Socialist History Occasional Papers Series No 12. 2001. ISBN 0-9537742-1-X
