= Sam Bornstein =

British Trotskyist historian and activist (1920–1990)

- Born: 1920
- Died: 1990 (aged 69–70)
- Organizations: ILP Guild of Youth; Workers International League
- Known for: Historian of British Trotskyism
- Notable work: Revolutionary History
- Movement: Trotskyism

Sam Bornstein (1920 - 1990) was a British Trotskyist historian and activist.

Bornstein was a member of the ILP Guild of Youth, but eventually moved towards Trotskyist ideas and joined the Workers International League, helping to build their branch in Stepney.

With Al Richardson, published three books on the history of Trotskyism in Britain through their "Socialist Platform" publishing house. In 1988 they founded the journal Revolutionary History, dedicated to the history of the anti-Stalinist left.

== Publications ==
- Bornstein, Sam; Richardson, Al (1982). Two Steps Back: Communists and the Wider Labour Movement, 1939-1945. Socialist Platform. ISBN 0950842303.
- Bornstein, Sam; Richardson, Al (1986). Against the Stream: A History of the Trotskyist Movement in Britain 1924-1938. Socialist Platform. ISBN 0850366003.
- Bornstein, Sam; Richardson, Al (1986). The War and the International: A History of the British Trotskyist Movement, 1937-1949. Socialist Platform. ISBN 0950842338.
