= Denzil Dean Harber =

British Trotskyist leader and ornithologist

- Born: January 25, 1909; Streatham, London
- Died: August 31, 1966 (aged 57); Westminster Hospital, London
- Occupations: Political activist Ornithologist
- Known for: Early leader in British Trotskyism; Contributions to Sussex ornithology
- Political party: CPGB (1929–1932); CL (1932–1934); Marxist Group (1934–1935); Militant Group (1935–1938); RSL (1938–1944); RCP (1944–1949); The Club (1949)
- Spouse: Mary Whittaker (m. 1938)

Denzil Dean Harber (25 January 1909 – 31 August 1966) was an early British Trotskyist leader and later in his life a prominent British ornithologist.

== Biography ==
Denzil Dean Harber was born in Streatham on 25 January 1909. His father was a ship's carpenter turned architect, his mother the daughter of a successful south London butcher.

During the First World War the family moved to Sussex, where they lived in a succession of houses at Climping, Lewes, and Eastbourne and finally at the Black Mill, Ore near Hastings.

From a very early age he developed an interest in many aspects of natural history including reptiles, butterflies and moths, fossils and birds.

Suffering from chronic asthma from infancy his formal education was spasmodic. He was however taught how to learn, and how to plan courses of study himself by an inspiring private tutor. Developing what became a lifelong interest in languages he taught himself French and German.

It is not clear how he became interested in politics, but by the end of 1926 he was reading various anti-imperialist pamphlets published by the Labour Research Department. By March 1927 he had read the first volume of Capital. According to John McIlroy, he joined the Communist Party of Great Britain (CPGB) in 1929.

It was undoubtedly this political interest that led him to start to teach himself Russian and then to study Russian commerce at the London School of Economics (LSE). In the summer of 1932, he travelled to the Soviet Union as an interpreter for a Canadian journalist with the intention of settling there but was disillusioned by what he found. Returning home, he found copies of the Bulletin of the Opposition published in Russian by the Trotskyist Left Opposition in Henderson's bookshop in the Charing Cross Road.

Harber expected that the journalist who employed him would publish a full account of their visit to Russia and felt because he went as her employee it would not be right for him to publish his own, but in fact the journalist never did. However Harber did write a short report entitled Seeing Soviet Russia for the Lent Term 1933 issue of the student journal of the LSE Clare Market Review which included how he had witnessed famine in the Russian countryside and the ruin of Soviet agriculture. This is one of the very few contemporary accounts of Russian conditions written by an outside visitor fluent in Russian.

In 1932, Harber joined the Communist League, the successor of the Balham Group, an opposition group in the CPGB and the first Trotskyist group in the country. Trotsky advised the group to enter the Independent Labour Party (ILP), which had just disaffiliated from the Labour Party. Trotsky believed that the group should work for a "Bolshevik transformation of the party".

The majority of the Communist League argued against joining the ILP in favour of maintaining an open party, but allowed thirty of its members led by Harber to form a secretive "Bolshevik-Leninist Fraction" in the ILP. This difference in orientation essentially split the party, and in November 1934, sixty Trotskyist ILPers officially formed the Marxist Group, led by Harber.

While, perhaps due to this delay and infighting, the group never achieved the influence hoped for by Trotsky, it did win new members, including C. L. R. James. Ted Grant also joined the organisation, having moved from South Africa. By the ILP Conference of 1935, it claimed a similar strength to the Revolutionary Policy Committee, which was sympathetic to the Communist Party of Great Britain.

However, the Harberites now left the ILP to join the Labour Party, as Trotsky urged, forming the Militant Group. Harber later led this group into the Revolutionary Socialist League (RSL), of which he was a secretary for a time. In 1944, the RSL fused with the rival Workers International League to form the Revolutionary Communist Party (1944–1949).

Harber was one of the British delegates to the founding conference of the Fourth International in Paris on 3 September 1938 and together with C. L. R. James was elected to represent Britain on the International Executive Committee.

Later that month he married Mary Whittaker, whom he had first met in the Labour League of Youth. The following year he moved with her to Eastbourne in Sussex, where he became a Co-operative Society insurance agent, a job he held for the rest of his life.

By 1937 he had revived his interest in natural history and in particular in ornithology. In Sussex he started to contribute to the South-Eastern Bird Report. That of 1939 records his sighting of a snow-bunting at Birling Gap near Eastbourne on 24 September. For the next ten years he combined political activity with ornithology

Harber had long opposed Gerry Healy, but after the Revolutionary Communist Party was dissolved in 1949 he briefly followed many of his comrades into Healy's group, The Club. However, after publishing one article in the Club's journal, Marxist Review, he abandoned active politics (though not his political beliefs) in favour of ornithology.

In 1948, the Sussex section of the South Eastern Bird Report became an independent publication The Sussex Bird Report under the editorship of Grahame des Forges. In 1949, Harber became the report's co-editor and from 1956 its sole editor, a position he held until 1962, when he relinquished control to the newly formed Sussex Ornithological Society. His and des Forges's A Guide to the Birds of Sussex was published in 1963.

Very early in his ornithological career, Harber had come to the conclusion that a series of rare and exotic birds, allegedly shot in an area around Hastings between 1903 and 1916 (the so-called Hastings rarities), were forgeries. In the manuscript of A Guide to the Birds of Sussex he and des Forges rejected them. By the time the Guide was published, a full exposure of the forgery had been published in British Birds (1962, vol. 55 8 283–349).

Harber's reputation as an ornithologist increased over the years. In 1955, in an extended review of The Birds of the Soviet Union for British Birds, he brought together his knowledge of Russian and ornithology. In 1959, he was invited to join the British Birds Rarities Committee, the official adjudicator of rare bird records in Britain, and in 1963 became its Honorary Secretary.

He died on 31 August 1966. Harber was survived by his wife Mary and three sons Julian, Paul and Guy.

== Selected writings ==
Ornithology

- "Mid-Season Movements of Swifts in Sussex", British Birds Vol. 45, 1952, pp. 216–218
- Special Review of The Birds of the Soviet Union, British Birds Vol. 48, 1955, pp. 218–224, 268–276, 313–319, 343–348, 404–410, 447–453, 505–511
- "Slender-Billed Gull in Sussex", British Birds, Vol. 55, 1962, pp. 169–171
- (with G. des Forges) A Guide to the Birds of Sussex, Edinburgh, 1963
- Chapter on Yugoslavia in A Guide to Bird-Watching in Europe, ed. J. Ferguson-Lees, Q. Hockliffe and K. Zweeres, London, 1972
