= Pete Glatter =

Pete Glatter (January 1949 – March 2008) was a British-based radical analyst of the Soviet Union and Russia, whose developing career was cut short by degenerative illness in March 2008. His parents moved to Britain from Austria in the 1930s. His brother, Ron Glatter, is emeritus professor of educational administration and management at the U.K.’s Open University, and formerly the honorary president of BELMAS (British Educational Leadership, Management and Administration Society).

== Political commitment ==
Glatter grew up in postwar Britain and like a number of radicals, inspired by the vision of change from below, choose to avoid university education through the world of work having been expelled from school in 1966. For many years he worked in London in the 1970s as a bus driver while playing an active role in the socialist and radical movements of the day. He joined the International Socialists as a teenager and always remained a committed member of the Socialist Workers Party. His first significant piece of writing was on the rank and file movement of London bus workers in 1975. In the 1980s he became an ambulance worker until an injury forced him to rethink his situation. By this stage he had already begun to develop a fascination with the Soviet Union. In 1985, on the 80th anniversary of the 1905 Revolution in Russia, he published a small pamphlet which remains one of the best short introductions to that tumultuous year, 1905: the great dress rehearsal, 1985.

== Academic career ==
In the late 1980s Glatter decided to go to university to study Russian. After 3 years at Queen Mary College in London, inspired by Donald Rayfield, he emerged with a first class degree in Russian – a remarkable achievement, especially considering that he had only a limited time in Russia itself. He also put his language talents to use by working on Amnesty International’s former USSR desk (later becoming for a period in 2001-2002 Amnesty’s South Caucasus Researcher). Now in his late 40s, he won a bursary as a research student at the University of Wolverhampton to work with Professor Neil Malcolm on the relationship between the Russian regions and the world economy in the wake of the collapse of the USSR. But Glatter’s research took a different direction and the focus became the way in which ‘elites’ in key regions (or as he saw it remnants of the old ruling class) were maintaining themselves in power. This was the background to articles on the effect of the transition in Russia’s oil rich East and on the crisis of 1998. The completion of his doctorate was delayed, however, partly by the explosion of internet sources and partly by his work at the British Library where worked to help catalogue many of the independent newspapers that had been published in Russia and copies of which had been secured by the library. This gave him an unrivalled source base and the final thesis was characterized by impressive detail in terms of its empirical base as well as originality in terms of its argument.

His argument, more controversial then, perhaps than now, was that in the 1990s in Russia the links connecting the different elements that had ruled the old USSR collapsed but much of the personnel of the old order or those close to them remained in power. To consolidate their position they had therefore to merge their political and economic interests. He likened this to an officer corps where the officers remain in power but the chain of command collapses. This argument was important not only with respect to the 1990s but also the Putin regime that seemed to begin to restore more stability after 2000. While many were tempted to see this as a restoration of the old chain of command Glatter’s analysis led him to argue that this was much more a negotiated process and the centre was less strong then some imagined.

He remained fascinated, though, by Russia’s history, and especially 1905. The 2005 anniversary of 1905 led to his conceiving a major project to make available a mass of new material in English. Glatter became aware that there was a rich collection of primary sources including autobiographical accounts, some of them collected for the twentieth anniversary in 1925 that could illuminate the events and their dynamics. He therefore gained agreement to translate and publish these in a book length issue of Revolutionary History, which in addition contains articles and data on strikes and the Rosa Luxemburg’s analysis of 1905. Making these sources available in English and a good translation was a major achievement and this will stand as a monument to his work and the potential that was soon to be lost. He then began work with the archaeologist Neil Faulkner on a project on the crisis of 1914-1921.

But his more immediate aim was to return to the modern Russian state and to write an account of Russia under Putin that would be finished in 2008 following the ending of the Putin presidency. But in 2007 he was affected by a series of what appeared to be physical problems but which soon turned out to have their origin in a sporadic CJD. His career was cut short at that point when he might have begun to further develop his potential and enhance our understanding of the past and present of Russia.

== Publications ==
Glatter published many articles, a selection:

Pete Glatter, ‘Second Class Students’, International Socialism, first series, no. 47 April/May 1971.

Pete, Glatter, ‘London Busmen: Rise and Fall of a Rank and File Movement’, International Socialism, first series, no.74, January 1975.

Pete Glatter, 1905: the great dress rehearsal, London : Socialist Workers Party, 1985, ISBN 0-905998-49-9. (The pamphlet was subsequently translated into German, Pete Glatter, Rußland 1905. Vom Massenstreik zu Rätedemokratie, April 1985, London).

Pete Glatter, ‘Regional and Local Power in Russia’, Slovo, Volume 8.1 (1995).

Pete Glatter, ‘Tyumen: the West Siberian Oil and Gas province’, Royal Institute of International Affairs Russia and Eurasia Programme, February, 1997, pp. 1–6.

Pete Glatter, ‘Victor Serge: Writing for the Future’, International Socialism, series 2, no. 76, September 1997.

Mike Haynes and Pete Glatter, ‘The Russia Catastrophe’, International Socialism, Winter, no. 81, 1998.

Peter Glatter, ‘Federalization, Fragmentation, and the West Siberian Oil and Gas Province’, in D.Lane ed., The Political Economy of Russian Oil, Rowman & Littlefield Pub Inc, 1999, pp. 143–162.

Pete Glatter, ‘Stalinism & centralisation’, New Socialist Approaches to History Seminar, Institute of Historical Research, December 6, 2003.

Peter Glatter, ‘Continuity and Change in the Tyumen' Regional Elite 1991-2001’, Europe-Asia Studies, Vol. 55, No. 3 (May 2003), pp. 401–435.

Pete Glatter, ‘Russia: Oligarch Enemies’, Socialist Review, December 2003.

Pete Glatter, ‘Review article: On Elites after State Socialism: Theories and Analysis, edited by John Higley and György Lengyel’, Historical Materialism, Volume 11, Number 1 / April, 2003, pp. 243–255.

The Russian Revolution of 1905: Change Through Struggle, Revolutionary History Vol 9 No 1 (Editorial: Pete Glatter; Introduction; The Road to Bloody Sunday (Introduced by Pete Glatter); A Revolution Takes Shape (Introduced by Pete Glatter); The Decisive Days (Introduced by Pete Glatter and Philip Ruff); Rosa Luxemburg and the 1905 Revolution (Introduced by Mark Thomas); Mike Haynes, Patterns of Conflict in the 1905 Revolution)

P.Glatter, ‘1905 The consciousness factor’, International Socialism, second series, no. 108, 2005

Pete Glatter, ‘Russia: Rising from the East?’, Socialist Review, January 2007.
