= Chartist (magazine) =

London socialist publication

- Cover of Chartist №321 illustrated by Martin Rowson
- Editor: Mike Davis
- Web editor: Keir Dhillon
- Reviews: Duncan Bowie
- Production: Ferdousur Rehman
- Former editors: Chris Knight
- Frequency: Bi-monthly
- Publisher: Chartist Collective
- Founder: Al Richardson
- Founded: May 1970
- Country: United Kingdom
- Based in: London
- Language: English
- Website: chartist.org.uk
- ISSN: 0968-7866
- OCLC: 266029914

Chartist is a bi-monthly democratic socialist magazine which has been published in Britain since the 1970s. The magazine is based in London. Its name is inspired by the Chartists, a British democratic movement which existed from 1838–1857.

== History and profile ==
The Chartist Group was co-founded by the historian Al Richardson in May 1970 with the intention of orienting the left toward the Labour Party. Chartist started as an 8 page tabloid style newspaper of the grouping, advocating insurrectionist politics. In response Mike Davis was elected as the publications editor, a position he's retained since 1974.

The magazine's editorial policy is firmly aligned with the "democratic socialist left" within the Labour Party, supporting such causes as the Grassroots Alliance slate in Labour National Executive Committee elections and the Save The Labour Party initiative. Its readership and editorial board are not confined, however, to the Labour Party or any one of its factions. This is because it seeks to invite debate with the broader left including greens and various independence movements. It has offered support to Jeremy Corbyn as leader of the Labour Party. Chartist defines its policy as being "to promote debate amongst people active in radical politics about the contemporary relevance of democratic socialism across the spectrum of politics, economics, science, philosophy, art, interpersonal relations – in short, the whole realm of social life".

The current editor is Mike Davis. The magazine's production editor and treasurer is Peter Kenyon, and its web editor is Keir Dhillon. Other members of the Editorial Board include Duncan Bowie, Peter Chalk, David Floyd, Don Flynn, Roger Gillham, Frank Lee, Dave Lister, Mary Southcott, James Grayson, Patricia d'Ardenne and Sheila Osmanovic, Robbie Scott, Patrick Mulcahy and Tehmina Kazi. The cover cartoon is often by Martin Rowson and production of the print edition since 2020 has been by Ferdousur Rehman.
