= Bill Hunter (politician) =

Bill Hunter (1920 – 9 July 2015) was a Trotskyist activist in Britain and a leader of the International Socialist League.

== Life ==
Hunter began his revolutionary career as a member of the Independent Labour Party in World War II, when he was a part of the circle around the Free Expression discussion magazine in that group. With the decline of the ILP, Hunter became a Trotskyist and joined the Revolutionary Communist Party in which he played a leading role in its final period.

With the collapse of the RCP, Hunter joined the Gerry Healy-led group known as The Club, although he had not belonged to Healy's faction in the RCP. He remained a leading member of Healy's groups until the collapse of the organisation.

When Healy's Workers Revolutionary Party split in 1985, Hunter joined Cliff Slaughter's anti-Healy faction, around what was soon renamed the Workers Press newspaper. In this group, he became attracted to the faction of international Trotskyism led by Nahuel Moreno. In 1988, he and Martin Ralph led a small split to form the International Socialist League as a section of Moreno's organisation.

Bill Hunter wrote several books, including Forgotten Hero: The Life and Times of Edward Rushton about the blind Liverpool-born anti-slavery campaigner, and the two part autobiography Lifelong Apprenticeship: The Life and Times of a Revolutionary. He died on 9 July 2015.
