= ILP Guild of Youth =

The ILP Guild of Youth was a British socialist youth organization, the youth wing of the Independent Labour Party. The ILP Guild of Youth was founded in 1924. A year after its founding, the ILP Guild of Youth had 171 branches. The launching of the ILP Guild of Youth provoked the Labour Party to found its League of Youth. By the end of 1927 the organization had 182 branches, with a combined membership of around 9,000. The ILP Guild of Youth published the organ Flame.

Like the Labour League of Youth, the ILP Guild of Youth had a complicated relationship with its mother party. The National Committee of the ILP Guild of Youth decided to apply for 'sympathetic affiliation' to the Young Communist International, a decision that was ratified by the 1934 Norwich conference of the Guild of Youth (the decision was passed by 18 votes against 12). In response, the ILP leadership declared that the Guild of Youth no longer could remain as the youth wing of the party. A special conference of the ILP Guild of Youth was assembled in Derby in November 1934. At that conference, the application to the Communist Youth International was withdrawn in a move to retain the unity with ILP.

In 1935 the ILP annual party conference decided to reduce the age limit for party membership to 21, a move that undercut the organizational capacity of the ILP Guild of Youth.

At the onset of the Second World War the ILP leadership resolved to dissolve the ILP Guild of Youth, calling on its activists to integrate into the party.
