= Marxist Group (UK) =

- Leader: Denzil Dean Harber (1934-1935); C. L. R. James (1935-1938)
- Founded: November 1934
- Dissolved: 1938
- Split from: Communist League
- Merged into: Revolutionary Socialist League
- Headquarters: Glasgow
- Ideology: Trotskyism
- Political position: Far-left
- National affiliation: Independent Labour Party (1934–1936)

The Marxist Group was an early Trotskyist group in the United Kingdom.

== History ==
Its origins lay in the Communist League, one of the first Trotskyist groups in the country. Leon Trotsky advised the group to enter the Independent Labour Party (ILP), which had just disaffiliated from the Labour Party. He believed that the group should work for a "Bolshevik transformation of the party".

The majority of the Communist League argued against joining the ILP in favour of maintaining an open party, but allowed thirty of its members led by Denzil Dean Harber to form a secretive "Bolshevik-Leninist Fraction" in the ILP. This difference in orientation essentially split the party, and in November 1934, sixty Trotskyist ILPers officially formed the Marxist Group.

While, perhaps due to this delay and infighting, the Group never achieved the influence hoped for by Trotsky, it did win new members, including C. L. R. James, who in 1937 dedicated his book World Revolution to the group. Ted Grant also joined the organisation, having moved from South Africa. By the ILP Conference of 1935, it claimed a similar strength to the Revolutionary Policy Committee, which was sympathetic to the Communist Party of Great Britain. However the same year a group (including Grant and Harber) split to work inside the Labour Party's Labour League of Youth, initially as the "Bolshevik-Leninist Group" and then as the Militant Group.

The Marxist Group soon realised that the ILP did not have mass influence outside Glasgow, and sent John Archer to check the actual strength of the party around the country. Trotsky proposed drawing up a manifesto around a militant programme, including a call for a Fourth International, and requesting signatures to see how much influence the Group had. While the Group was unable to reach a decision on this, at the 1936 ILP Conference, none of its motions were passed. Because these motions included a clear call for the Fourth International, many members of the Group were expelled from the ILP, including James. James then convinced the remainder of his organisation to exit the ILP.

Outside the ILP, the Group began working again with the Marxist League (as the Communist League was now called), and in early 1938 the two joined to form the Revolutionary Socialist League, into which the Militant Group fused later the same year.
