= Al Richardson (historian) =

British Trotskyist historian and activist

- Born: Alec Stuart Richardson; 20 December 1941; Woolley Colliery, Yorkshire, England
- Died: 22 November 2003 (aged 61); London, England
- Other name: Richard Stephenson
- Education: University of Hull
- Occupations: Historian; Teacher
- Employers: University of Exeter; Forest Hill School
- Known for: Karl Marx Memorial Pub Crawl
- Notable work: Revolutionary History; Two Steps Back
- Political party: Labour
- Movement: Trotskyism
- Children: 2

Alec Stuart "Al" Richardson (20 December 1941 – 22 November 2003) was a British Trotskyist historian and activist.

== Biography ==
Born in Woolley Colliery, a pit village near Barnsley in Yorkshire, Richardson studied theology at the University of Hull before becoming a lecturer at the University of Exeter. He joined the Communist Party of Great Britain, but left after reading Isaac Deutscher's biography of Leon Trotsky. Convinced of Trotskyism, Richardson joined the Socialist Labour League (SLL), and resigned from the faculty at Exeter to become a history teacher at Forest Hill School, South London. He soon quit the SLL to join the rival International Marxist Group (IMG), and became prominent in the Vietnam Solidarity Campaign.

Despite having hitchhiked to Paris to join the events of May 1968, Richardson was part of a small group that rejected the IMG's turn away from trade unions and the labour movement to work in the student movement. He became a founding member of the breakaway Revolutionary Communist League and was elected to its leadership, but in 1973 he left the League. Around this time he co-founded the Chartist magazine, and remained one of its influential figures.

From the mid-1970s, Richardson focused his attention on recording the history of Trotskyism in Britain. He began interviewing veterans of the movement and, with Sam Bornstein, published three books on the topic through their Socialist Platform publishing house. In 1988, they founded the journal Revolutionary History, dedicated to the history of the anti-Stalinist left. The editor of Socialist Appeal described Richardson as "the first to publish a serious account of the History of British Trotskyism". Richardson also published under the pen name of Richard Stephenson.

Richardson worked with various Trotskyist groups, in particular Workers Liberty, Workers Action and the Militant tendency, whose approaches he felt were closest to his own. However, in contrast to these groups, he opposed campaigns on the basis of race, gender or sexuality, believing that they were popular frontist. He never abandoned work inside the Labour Party, because he believed that any future revolutionary party can emerge only from within a mass working-class party.

=== Death ===
Richardson continued teaching and writing until his unexpected death on 22 November 2003. His funeral at Mortlake Crematorium was attended by 150 friends and former pupils, who draped his coffin in the flag of the Fourth International.

== Personal life ==
Richardson was born into a family tied to the local mining industry; his grandfather had once lost his job after supporting a strike at the mine he was foreman of. The son of a colliery worker, Richardson was raised in a religious household. Although he failed his eleven-plus, he was able to continue his education up to university level. He later came to reject labour history as it was studied in universities, believing that the left needed to record its own history. As such he amassed a large personal archive of the socialist movement in Britain. As a keen Egyptologist Richardson was a member of the Egypt Exploration Society, and was fluent in Egyptian hieroglyphics, Geʽez, third century Greek, and French.

== Legacy ==
From the 1960s on, Richardson organised the first Karl Marx Memorial Pub Crawl, a tradition that has since been continued by various organised groups.

Papers left by Richardson and Jim Higgins have been deposited in the Library of the University of London, which is in the university's Senate House.

== Selected bibliography ==
- Stephenson, Richard, ed. (1979). The Early Years of the British Left Opposition.
- Bornstein, Sam; Richardson, Al (1982). Two Steps Back: Communists and the Wider Labour Movement, 1939-1945. Socialist Platform. ISBN 0950842303.
- Bornstein, Sam; Richardson, Al (1986). Against the Stream: A History of the Trotskyist Movement in Britain 1924-1938. Socialist Platform. ISBN 0850366003.
- Bornstein, Sam; Richardson, Al (1986). The War and the International: A History of the British Trotskyist Movement, 1937-1949. Socialist Platform. ISBN 0950842338.
- Richardson, Al. "Introduction". In C.L.R. James (1993). World Revolution, 1917-1936: The Rise and Fall of the Communist International. Humanities Press. ISBN 1573925837.
- Richardson, Al, ed. (1995). In Defence of the Russian Revolution: A Selection of Bolshevik Writings, 1917-23. Porcupine Press. ISBN 1899438025.
- Rosmer, Alfred; Souvarine, Boris; Fabrol, Emile; Clavez, Antoine (2001). Richardson, Al (ed.). Trotsky and the Origins of Trotskyism. Francis Boutle Publishers. ISBN 190342707X.
- Richardson, Al, ed. (2002). What Became of the Revolution: Selected Writings of Boris Souvarine. Socialist Platform. ISBN 0952364832.
- Richardson, Al, ed. (2003). The Revolution Defamed: A Documentary History of Vietnamese Trotskyism. Socialist Platform. ISBN 0952364840.
