= Charlie van Gelderen =

South African Trotskyist

Charlie van Gelderen (14 August 1913 – 26 October 2001) was a South African Trotskyist active in the British Labour movement from the 1930s. He attended the founding conference of the Fourth International in 1938, and towards the end of his life he was the last survivor of that conference.

In the 1940s, he played the leading role for the Revolutionary Communist Party's fraction in the Labour Party. He became a leader of the International Marxist Group, and served on the editorial board of its magazine, International. After the break-up of the IMG, he joined the International Socialist Group.
