= Post–World War II demobilization strikes =

Labor and military discharge protests

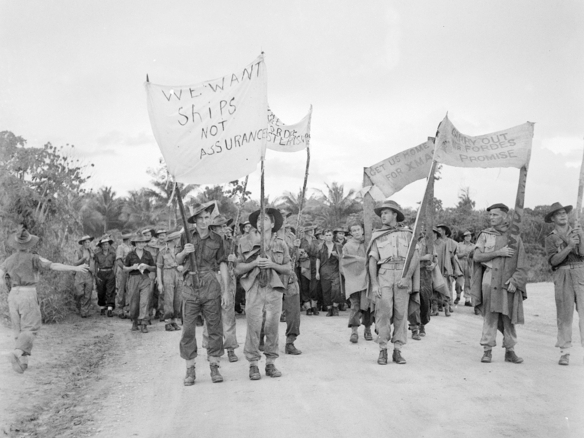
Long-serving Australian military personnel at Morotai protesting in December 1945 about delays in their repatriation to Australia and demobilization. 4,500 men took part in the protest.

Post–World War II demobilization strikes occurred within Allied military forces stationed across the Middle East, India and South-East Asia in the months and years following World War II. American military personnel based in occupied Germany were holding mass parades for speedier demobilization and in the Philippines formed soldiers committees and went on demonstrations calling for a return home. In India, thousands of Royal Air Force servicemen pushed for demobilization and went on strike citing grievances over conditions of work such as deaths in high temperatures in Cawnpore (station: 322 MU Cawnpore) and overcrowding at RAF Jodhpur. A "Forces Parliament" was set up - effectively a workers' council, but was dissolved before the issues came to a head. The issue was a major subject of debate in the British Parliament. At one point Prime Minister Clement Attlee was presented with a petition by India-stationed servicemen that stated:

We have done the job we joined up to do. Now we want to get back home, both for personal reasons and because we think it is by work that we can best help Britain. No indication has been given of when we will see our families again. Is it because the government wishes to talk tough with other powers?

Some brigades in India were disbanded as they were viewed as "politically unreliable" suggesting that in event of being used to put down disturbances they would have refused.

The Conservatives demanded to know whether the new Labour government thought there was any difference between a strike and a mutiny. Some 'agitators' or strike leaders were jailed, but public pressure through MPs led to their early release or reduction in sentences.

== See also ==
- Demobilisation of the Australian military after World War II
- Demobilisation of the British Armed Forces after World War II
- Demobilization of United States armed forces after World War II
- Royal Air Force Mutiny of 1946
- Royal Indian Navy Mutiny of 1946 of Indian sailors also demanded demobilisation
- 1947 Royal New Zealand Navy mutinies
- Cairo Forces Parliament
- Helwan Riots (1945)
