= Organ crawl =

Tour of local pipe organs

An organ crawl is a tour of several pipe organs at different locations in an area, usually taken by a group of enthusiasts. It may include short concerts or opportunities to play the instruments at each location, commentary from their organists or other experts, and so on.
