= Militant Group =

- Founder: Denzil Dean Harber
- Founded: 1935
- Dissolved: 1938
- Split from: Marxist Group
- Merged into: Revolutionary Socialist League
- Newspaper: Militant
- Ideology: Trotskyism
- Political position: Far-left
- National affiliation: Labour Party

The Militant Group was an early British Trotskyist group, formed in 1935 by Denzil Dean Harber, former leader of the Marxist Group in the ILP, as a separate entrist group inside the Labour Party.

Initially known as the Bolshevik-Leninist Group, the entrist group was producing a bulletin Youth Militant in 1935 and a journal Militant by 1937; the group became known as the Militant Group and later the Militant Labour League the same year.

The group was strengthened by an influx of South African Trotskyists, including Ted Grant and Ralph Lee (Raphael Levy). However, allegations concerning Lee (relating to false rumours of misuse of strike funds in South Africa) prompted around ten members, including Grant, Lee, Jock Haston, Betty Hamilton and Gerry Healy to split in 1937 and form the Workers International League.

In 1938, the Militant Group merged with the Revolutionary Socialist League, and the Revolutionary Socialist Party to form a new Revolutionary Socialist League, the official section of the Fourth International in Britain.
