= Revolutionary Socialist Party (UK) =

Political party in Britain

- Leader: William Campbell Tait
- Founded: 1912
- Dissolved: 1938
- Split from: Socialist Labour Party
- Merged into: Revolutionary Socialist League (1938)
- Headquarters: Edinburgh
- Newspaper: The Proletariat
- Ideology: De Leonism; Centrist Marxism; Trotskyism (from 1937)
- Political position: Left-wing to far-left
- International affiliation: International Revolutionary Marxist Centre (1936-1938); Fourth International (1938-1941)

The Revolutionary Socialist Party, initially known as the International Socialist Labour Party, was a political party in Britain. Its origins were in the British Section of the International Socialist Labour Party, a De Leonist group, formed in 1912 following disputes within the Socialist Labour Party of Great Britain (SLP). It met under the name British Section of the International Socialist Labour Party between 1912 and 1937, standing municipal election candidates between 1919 and 1934 and general election candidates in 1918 and 1929, and Revolutionary Socialist Party between 1936 and 1941.

The party was mainly based in Edinburgh, where it had its office and most of the party members lived. Members were also present in Glasgow, Aberdeen and Yorkshire. The party published The Proletariat and later The British Revolutionary Socialist. Principal members included William Campbell Tait (the National Organiser from 1927) and Frank Maitland.

RSP took part in conferences of the London Bureau as an observer. The party approached the Independent Labour Party about a merger in 1937, but the ILP rejected it on the grounds that the RSP was under trotskyist influence. The RSP then began orienting itself towards the Fourth International and met with James P. Cannon of the Movement for the Fourth International.

The RSP was invited to and took part in the 'National Conference of Bolshevik-Leninists', held on 30 July – 31 July 1938. Through this conference, the RSP merged into the Revolutionary Socialist League. In September 1938 Tait travelled to Paris to participate in the founding conference of the Fourth International. Before long, however, the group parted with the International. In March 1939 it began to publish a paper called the Workers Weekly. Most of its members joined the Independent Labour Party during World War II.
