= Proletarian Military Policy =

The Proletarian Military Policy was a policy adopted by the Fourth International in response to World War II. It was an attempt to apply transitional demands such as trade union control of military training and the election of officers to transform what it characterised as an imperialist war into a revolutionary struggle against Nazism.

In 1940, alongside his call for an unconditional defence of the Soviet Union, Trotsky outlined the approach to be adopted by Marxists who were conscripted into the military,

"We are absolutely in favor of compulsory military training and in the same way for conscription. Conscription? Yes. By the bourgeois state? No. We cannot entrust this work, as any other, to the state of the exploiters. In our propaganda and agitation we must very strongly differentiate these two questions. That is, not to fight against the necessity of the workers being good soldiers and of building up an army based on discipline, science, strong bodies and so on, including conscription, but against the capitalist state which abuses the army for the advantage of the exploiting class."

The policy provoked controversy within the Trotskyist movement with some seeing it as a concession to social patriotism. In the American SWP, Max Shachtman and James Burnham characterised the Soviet Union as 'state capitalist' and disagreed with the policy.

== Britain ==
In Britain, the Workers' International League (WIL) adopted the PMP into their programme. The majority of workers supported the war because they had a genuine fear of an invasion by Nazi Germany and a desire to defeat Nazism. At the same time, the British ruling class could not be trusted to fight a war that would decisively defeat Hitler "since they had supported and helped Hitler before the war". Only the working class could successfully carry out such a struggle.

Therefore, the WIL conducted "revolutionary work" in the armed forces upon conscription and agitated for a "revolutionary war against fascism and for socialism". It was reflected in the slogan 'First Hitler, then Churchill'.

The military establishment organised the Army Bureau of Current Affairs, which was intended to "educate" soldiers about current events. Where WIL members were based, they took control of the classes and used them to promote "revolutionary" ideas. In the case of WIL member Frank Ward, the military was compelled to give him an "honourable discharge" from the air force and sent him home in order to prevent him from conducting "revolutionary activity".

In a similar incident, the Cairo Forces Parliament was shut down because of the growing support for the "revolutionary ideas" promoted by WIL members. They were elected to the positions of Prime Minister and Home Secretary. They won the support of many soldiers as described by Ted Grant,

"From the reports of our soldier comrades, the Eighth Army soldiers were saying that after the war they would refuse to disarm, and return to Britain with their guns to ensure that things would change. This was the mutinous mood that was developing amongst these troops. At the 1943 conference of our tendency, I made the point, to illustrate the thing graphically, that the military establishment though it their army, but in fact, the soldiers of the Eighth Army were in rebellion. This reflected the revolutionary developments in the army. It was our Eighth Army in that it was being transformed. It was becoming revolutionary and in the process of moving over to the side of the working class."
