= Workers' International League (1937) =

- Leader: Jock Haston
- Founded: 1937
- Dissolved: 1944
- Split from: Militant Group
- Merged into: Revolutionary Communist Party
- Headquarters: London
- Ideology: Trotskyism
- Political position: Far-left

The Workers' International League (WIL) was a Trotskyist group that existed in Britain from 1937 to 1944.

== Formation ==
The WIL was formed in 1937 by members of the Militant Group, who had split due to false allegations from the leadership of that group that Ralph Lee (born Raphael Levy), then a newly arrived South African member, had misled a strike and used the strike funds to move to England.

The split took around a third of the membership of the Militant Group and four of its branches, including Jock Haston and Ted Grant. The group remained in the Labour Party, where they published Searchlight edited by Gerry Healy, which in September 1938 was replaced by the magazine Youth for Socialism, which in its own turn was renamed Socialist Appeal in June 1941 as a result of the WIL's turn of focus away from the Labour Party. The group also produced a theoretical journal Workers International News. The WIL grew with recruits from the Labour Party, the Communist Party of Great Britain, the Independent Labour Party and the Militant Group.

The Fourth International was formed in 1938, and the WIL refused to merge into the newly formed official British affiliate, the Revolutionary Socialist League itself a regroupment of the Militant Group and others. The international also had a poor view of the group, placing it in the category of "national groupings... reactionary in essence".

== Outbreak of World War II ==
Unlike the Revolutionary Socialist League, the WIL readily adopted the Proletarian Military Policy developed by Trotsky in his last writings and expanded upon and advocated by James P Cannon and the Socialist Workers Party. They campaigned for the creation of workers' militias instead of the Home Guard, deep air raid shelters for workers, and after 1941 against the pro-war, anti-strike position of the CPGB. By 1942, the WIL had a membership of 250, primarily working-class members.

=== Proletarian Military Policy ===
The majority of British workers supported the war because they had a genuine fear of an invasion by Nazi Germany and a desire to defeat Nazism. At the same time, the British ruling class could not be trusted to fight a war that would decisively defeat Hitler since they had supported and helped Hitler before the war. Only the working class could successfully carry out such a struggle. Therefore, the WIL conducted revolutionary work in the armed forces upon conscription and agitated for a revolutionary war against fascism and for socialism. It was reflected in the slogan 'First Hitler, then Churchill'.

The military establishment organised the Army Bureau of Current Affairs, which was intended to educate soldiers about current events. Where WIL members were based, they took control of the classes and used them to promote revolutionary ideas. In the case of WIL member Frank Ward, his revolutionary work was so successful that the military was compelled to give him an "honourable discharge" from the air force and sent him home in order to prevent him from conducting revolutionary activity.

In a similar incident, the Cairo Forces Parliament was shut down because of the growing support for the revolutionary ideas promoted by WIL members. They were elected to the positions of Prime Minister and Home Secretary. Their revolutionary work was successful in winning the support of many soldiers, as described by Ted Grant,

"From the reports of our soldier comrades, the Eighth Army soldiers were saying that after the war they would refuse to disarm, and return to Britain with their guns to ensure that things would change. This was the mutinous mood that was developing amongst these troops. At the 1943 conference of our tendency, I made the point, to illustrate the thing graphically, that the military establishment though it their army, but in fact, the soldiers of the Eighth Army were in rebellion. This reflected the revolutionary developments in the army. It was our Eighth Army in that it was being transformed. It was becoming revolutionary and in the process of moving over to the side of the working class."

=== Question of the Leadership ===
Due to its adoption of the Proletarian Military Policy, the WIL argued that its members should go through the experience of the war with other members of their class by joining the army when called-up. But if this was applied to the whole membership it meant they could be dispersed and provide no real leadership and therefore the organisation took measures to preserve the leading cadres outside the forces.

With the outbreak of World War II, the WIL expected to be banned and so temporarily moved a few members (Tommy Reilly, Jock Haston, Gerry Healy, John Williams and George Noseda) to Dublin. It soon became obvious that the group would not be persecuted, and they were allocated paper for their publications.

On their own initiative, Arthur Carford, who had gained employment as an orderly at the Medical Examination Centre, where potential conscripts fitness was reviewed, and three other members from Sheffield attempted to steal cards to exempt the bearer from military service for medical reasons. The four were arrested and charged at Sheffield Magistrates Court with "stealing, receiving, conspiring to steal and conspiring to receive these cards, to which later was added a fifth charge of doing those acts "with intent to assist the enemy". Realising the seriousness of these charges (especially the fifth charge which carried a charge of 20 years imprisonment), one of the defendants, Fred Jackson, defended himself arguing that by virtue of the political ideals, it was impossible for Trotskyists to do anything deliberately to assist Nazi Germany, leading to no guilty verdicts on the fifth charge. He was sentenced to 2 years imprisonment, with Carford receiving 18 months, however, given the irresponsibility of their initial action, they were barred from holding office within the WIL for a year and reduced to supporter status respectively. Of the other two defendants, Ward received 6 months and Beet was acquitted, but as both had given statements to the police that could have implicated the WIL they were expelled.

=== Trade Union Activities ===
The WIL began to orient towards the trade unions, and deprioritised entrism into the Labour Party. After the appointment of Roy Tearse as industrial organiser (replacing Gerry Healy), the WIL found itself involved through him in setting up a solidarity committee in support of victimised workers called the Clyde Workers Committee after the original organisation bearing that name which had led the revolt on the Clyde during World War I. This body called a conference in Glasgow on 5–6 June 1943, which attracted delegates from "Yorkshire's West Riding, Newcastle, Nottingham, Huddersfield, Barrow and London" and set up the Militant Workers Federation with Tearse as Secretary and offices in Nottingham near the Royal Ordnance Factory.

By 1944, the Fourth International had realised that the WIL were far more effective and closer to the FI's policies than the RSL which had disintegrated into a set of warring factions, and so coordinated a unity conference. This produced the Revolutionary Communist Party, which adopted all the WIL's positions.
