= Militant in Liverpool =

Trotskyist control of Liverpool City Council in the 1980s

The Liverpool City Council adopted policies largely inspired by those elected Councillors who were members of a left wing group known as the Militant tendency through much of the 1980s, and was subsequently taken to court by the Government of Margaret Thatcher.

== Policies of the Liverpool District Labour Party ==
In 1982, Liverpool District Labour Party adopted Militant policies for the city. It adopted the slogan "Better to break the law than break the poor" which had been the slogan of the Poplar council in the East End of London in 1919–20 and was to appear on the Liverpool City Council's banner in 1984–5.

The Labour Party said cuts to the Rate Support Grant for the city were unfair, and argued that £30 million had been stolen from Liverpool by Prime Minister Margaret Thatcher's government. Prominent Liverpool Militant supporters Derek Hatton and Tony Mulhearn argued that the minority Labour Council of 1980 should have attempted to set an illegal "deficit budget", spending money on the needs of the people of Liverpool even if it exceeded the council's income, and that it should demand that central government return the funding they believed had been stolen—via budget decreases and penalties—in order to balance the city budget.

== Control of Liverpool City Council ==
In May 1983, in the face of sustained negative local and national press coverage, the newly Militant-led Labour Party gained 12 seats in the local elections and took control of the council from the 1979–1983 Tory-Liberal coalition. Now committed to an ambitious regeneration strategy, whilst refusing to make any above-inflation rent and rate rises, its new seats included the Tory leader of the council. The new leader of the council, John Hamilton, was not a Militant member.

Labour's local election vote in Liverpool increased by 40%, or 22,000 extra votes. In Broadgreen, Labour's vote increased by 50% and a month later in the June 1983 general election, Militant supporter Terry Fields, standing on the slogan of "A workers' MP on a workers' wage", won the seat for Labour. The BBC had classed the seat as a marginal Tory seat in 1979. Militant reported that "it was the only Tory seat that was won by Labour".

The Liverpool Labour Party's vote continued to rise, with Militant claiming: "In 1982 Labour got 54,000 votes in the city, in 1983 77,000 votes, and in 1984 this soared to over 90,000. In 33 of the 34 contested seats Labour's vote increased. Labour held all 14 seats it was defending and seven seats were won from the Tories." However, no more than sixteen of the elected councillors were Militant members.

== Urban Regeneration Strategy ==
In 1984, Liverpool City Council launched its Urban Regeneration Strategy to build 5,000 houses, seven sports centres, new parks, six new nursery classes and other works, many of which were seen to completion. The 1,200 redundancies planned by the previous Liberal administration to balance the books were cancelled, and 1,000 new jobs were created. The office of Lord Mayor was abolished and the ceremonial horses sold.

In 1985, the council joined the rate-capping rebellion in an alliance with left-led councils across Britain. Apart from Lambeth, the sixteen other councils which had followed a policy of not setting a rate had bowed to the rate-capping measures of the Conservative government, and set legal rates. The left leaderships of these councils favoured a strategy of delaying the setting of the budget, but one by one they found the means of setting a budget, leaving Liverpool and Lambeth to fight alone. The council declared "In the event of Tory threats of bankruptcy and possible arrests becoming a reality, all out strike action will take place".

== Relations with Black organisations ==
Following the Toxteth Riots, Militant campaigned alongside the L8 Defence Committee for Chief Constable Kenneth Oxford's dismissal.

Under pressure from Black organisations to appoint a Principal Race Relations Advisor (PRRA) to work to combat racial discrimination in the city, the council appointed Sam Bond to the position of PRRA on 9 October 1984. Bond, a Black Londoner who had previously worked as a building surveyor and who had ideological ties to Militant, was controversial and his appointment sparked a backlash from the Black Caucus (successor to the L8 Defence Committee), a group of twelve Black community leaders who sat on the Council's Race Relations Liaison Committee. The day after Bond's appointment, the Black Caucus occupied the council buildings in protest, forcing Deputy Leader Derek Hatton to agree to re-advertise the post. After Militant reneged on this promise, the Black Caucus, alongside Bond's trade union, the National and Local Government Officers' Association (NALGO), launched a campaign against Bond, boycotting his Race Relations Unit. Bond retained his position until he was forced to resign following the 47 Militant-affiliated councillors' surcharge in 1987.

Militant disagreed with the Black Caucus's analysis of how to tackle Liverpool's racism. The Black Caucus advocated anti-racist education and positive action policies which would encourage more Black people from Liverpool 8 to attain jobs throughout the city. They condemned the 'colour-blind ideologies of local politicians, whether based on socialist, liberal, or conservative principles, which lead to a refusal to adopt positive action measures' they claimed were necessary. Militant believed that while Black people faced discrimination and 'double oppression', capitalism was the root of this inequity and that working-class unity should be prioritised to overturn the system.

== Illegal budget ==
On 14 June 1985, Liverpool City Council passed an illegal budget, in which spending exceeded income, demanding the deficit be made up by the government. As bankruptcy loomed and plans for all-out strike action were finally discussed, they were narrowly lost, and not all unions balloted their members.

Liverpool councillors were advised in late August 1985 by the District Auditor that the council was about to break its legal obligations and would not be able to pay wages to its staff by December of that year. In September 1985, rather than face immediate confrontation with the law, the Labour group on the council decided on the 'tactic' of issuing ninety-day notices to the 30,000 strong workforce to gain leeway to "campaign more vigorously than ever before". A covering letter dated 19 September 1985 sent to council employees with the redundancy notice, signed by council leader John Hamilton and his deputy Derek Hatton, explains:

Obviously the steps we have had to take will cause concern and worry. However, this course of action provides the only way of providing wages and salaries until 18th December, 1985. Other steps would certainly result in the immediate cessation of payments and the cutting of services ... Furthermore, this course of action gives the Government three months to negotiate with Labour representatives a just settlement to our financial crisis. If the Government recognises its responsibility then all notices will be withdrawn.

In his autobiography, Deputy Council leader Hatton acknowledged that taking this advice was an enormous mistake, from which the council never recovered. Although the council did not actually intend to make anyone redundant, many council staff felt the future of their jobs at the council were no longer guaranteed. The 90-day notices were seen as three months' notice of redundancy in all but name and treated as such by the media. Peter Taaffe, Militant's general secretary wrote that it was "a major tactical error".

The Council balanced the books in November 1985 after gaining £30 million in loans. In an editorial, the Militant newspaper called the budget an "orderly retreat".

In the meantime, the Urban Regeneration Strategy of the Liverpool City Council continued to provide jobs and build houses, schools and sports facilities. Lord Reg Underhill, since 1975 a long-standing opponent of Militant, wrote in a letter to The Guardian in September 1985:

I went to see the effects of Liverpool's regeneration strategy ... The five year plan is to get rid of outdated and sub-standard housing, the crumbling tenements and soulless systems-built tower flats. Already 3,800 separate homes have been built, with their own private gardens and nearby off-street parking ... improved street layouts, with tree-lined residential roads are planned. We saw the start of the 100-acre (0.40 km^{2}) park at Everton and of the initial development of other local parks. There are to be seven sport centres; three have just been opened. The scheme will provide work for 12,000 with side effects producing further thousands of jobs. Without commenting on the rating situation, how much is being saved to the Treasury by this employment?

== 1985 Labour Party Conference ==
Labour Party leader Neil Kinnock made a speech to the Labour Party Conference at the Bournemouth International Centre on 1 October 1985 that attacked Militant and their record in controlling Liverpool City Council:

I'll tell you what happens with impossible promises. You start with far-fetched resolutions; they are then pickled into a rigid dogma, a code, and you go through the years sticking to that, out-placed, outdated, irrelevant to the real needs, and you end in the grotesque chaos of a Labour council, a Labour council, hiring taxis to scuttle round the city handing out redundancy notices to its own workers. I tell you – and you'll listen – you can't play politics with people's jobs and people's homes and people's services.

Labour MP Eric Heffer walked off the platform during the speech while Derek Hatton repeatedly shouted "lies" at Kinnock from the balcony, and later condemned "the rantings and ravings" contained in his speech.

== Disciplinary action against Militant ==
The NEC subsequently suspended Liverpool District Labour Party in November 1985, and began an inquiry into the council's conduct. A minority were opposed. Dennis Skinner, then an NEC member, thought it was a diversion from the Tories and the "class enemy". "They're going to spend a lot of time examining their own navel," he said. Peter Kilfoyle was appointed as an organiser, with a specific remit to remove Militant supporters from the Labour Party.

Terry Fields increased his majority in 1987 and Labour did particularly well in Liverpool, leading Militant to deny Neil Kinnock's claim that its policies were unpopular. Militant's general secretary, Peter Taaffe, subsequently wrote:

Without the attack on the Liverpool Militant supporters, and a subsequent witch-hunt against others on the left, the right wing leadership would not have been able to carry through a massive revision in party policy in the period 1985–7. The attack on Liverpool paved the way for the defeat of Labour in the 1987 general election.

Derek Hatton was expelled from the Labour Party in June 1986.

== Rate capping defeat ==
In Liverpool, the district auditor had charged the Militant-led 49 Liverpool city councillors £106,000. Their appeal to the House of Lords was lost in 1987 and an additional charge of £242,000 was imposed. The money was raised from donations from the Labour and trade union movement.

== Expulsion from the Labour Party ==
When Eric Heffer died, Lesley Mahmood, a "Broad Left" councillor and a member of Militant, stood for the Labour nomination. Peter Kilfoyle, who had been the Labour Party organiser in the city since 1985, gained the nomination by a narrow margin; he had been involved in removing Militant influence from the Liverpool Labour Party. Mahmood stood as a "Walton Real Labour" candidate in the subsequent byelection gaining 6.5% of the vote.

Terry Fields was also criticised for his lack of support for Kilfoyle in a neighbouring seat as well as his militant approach to the community charge and was expelled from the Labour Party in December 1991. In the 1992 general election he stood as an independent against the Labour candidate, Jane Kennedy, but was defeated with 14% of the vote.

== In popular culture ==
The Alan Bleasdale-scripted television serial GBH (1991) was based on the period of Militant's control of Liverpool council.
