= Reginald Purbrick =

British politician (1877–1950)

Reginald Purbrick (1877 – 6 November 1950) was a Conservative Party politician elected as Member of Parliament for Liverpool Walton between 1929 and 1945. He is known for asking then Prime Minister Winston Churchill, whether the Royal Air Force would consider bombing Dresden and other East German cities.

In 1925, Purbrick and his family purchased the Tahbilk winery in Australia.

Parliament of the United Kingdom
Preceded by Harry Warden Stanley Chilcott	Member of Parliament for Liverpool Walton; 1929 – 1945	Succeeded by James Haworth
