= Terry Fields =

British politician

Member of Parliament for Liverpool Broadgreen
- In office 9 June 1983 – 16 March 1992
- Preceded by: Constituency Created
- Succeeded by: Jane Kennedy

Personal details
- Born: 8 March 1937 Bootle, Lancashire, England
- Died: 28 June 2008 (aged 71) Netherton, Merseyside, England
- Party: Labour (until 1991); Independent (after 1991)
- Spouse: Maureen
- Children: Paula Fields; Michael Fields; Denise Foley (Fields); Stephan Fields
- Profession: Firefighter

Terence Fields (8 March 1937 – 28 June 2008) was a British politician and firefighter. A member of the Militant group, he was the Labour Member of Parliament for Liverpool Broadgreen from 1983 to 1992. He was expelled from the Labour Party in 1991 with the rest of Militant. Earlier he had been on the executive of the Fire Brigades Union.

== Early life and activism ==
Fields was born in Bootle, north of Liverpool, the son of a dockworker. Educated at the Major Street County Secondary School and De La Salle Grammar School in Liverpool, Fields then spent two years on National Service in the Royal Army Medical Corps, an experience that he later claimed had radicalised him. Despite eye problems (which caused him to wear dark glasses), he became a fireman and later a Fire Brigades Union activist.

Fields joined the Labour Party in 1968. He was active in the Fire Brigades Union's national 1977–78 strike and shortly afterward he joined the Militant group. At the Labour Party's special conference in 1980 on the question of how to elect the Labour leader, Fields spoke before Denis Healey and said: "We need coordinated action by the whole of our class to get the Tories out, and the democracy that is being pumped out in the capitalist press is their democracy, not ours. We will find a new democracy when we have created a socialist state in this country... To the weak-hearted, the traitors and cowards I say: 'Get out of our movement. There is no place for you. Cross the House of Commons."

== Parliamentary career ==
Fields was selected as the Labour Party candidate for Liverpool Broadgreen for the general election in 1983. This was a new seat, but it was estimated by the BBC and ITN that had it been fought at the previous election in 1979 it would have returned a Conservative MP with a majority of 565. In line with Militant policy, he promised during his campaign that, if he was elected, he would be "a workers' MP on a worker's wage", a promise he kept by drawing only the equivalent of a fireman's wages and donating the balance of his MP's salary to trade union causes and, according to Doris Heffer, "to the party causes or, frankly, also to the coffers of Militant Tendency." Fields gained the friendship of other Labour MPs, including Doris Heffer's husband, Eric.

Fields made his maiden speech on 24 June 1983. His interventions in Parliament focused on issues unique to Liverpool as well as Central America, unemployment, and the coal mining and maritime transport industries.

On 11 July 1991, Fields was jailed for refusing to pay his poll tax bill of £373. In defence of the court's decision, Labour leader Neil Kinnock said: "Law makers must not be law breakers. I have always made that clear." Fields's sentence was for 60 days, meaning that he retained his seat in the House of Commons, as MPs only automatically lose their seat if they are imprisoned for more than a year. Labour Party members criticised Fields for his militant approach to the poll tax and his failure to support other Labour candidates, in particular Peter Kilfoyle in a by-election for the neighbouring constituency of Liverpool Walton, following Eric Heffer's death.

Fields was expelled from the Labour Party in December 1991 along with other members of Militant, including Dave Nellist, then the only other MP who was a member of the tendency.

== Later life ==
At the 1992 general election, Fields stood as an independent, winning 14% of the vote, while the official Labour Party candidate, Jane Kennedy, was elected. After losing his seat, Fields ran The Mayflower, a pub on Fazakerley Street in Liverpool, for six months. He did not join the Socialist Party, into which Militant eventually developed.

In 2002, at the age of 65, he returned briefly to the limelight after entering a burning house to rescue a woman trapped inside.

Fields died at his family home in Netherton on Saturday 28 June 2008, of lung cancer. Bob Wareing, a Liverpool Labour MP for 25 years, said at the time: "Even though we might disagree on the methods used by Militant Tendency, we in Liverpool could not but respect the sincerity and principled behaviour of Terry Fields." A memorial meeting for Fields, held shortly after his death, attracted 200 people.

== See also ==
- Fiona Onasanya—Labour MP for Peterborough who was the next sitting MP to be jailed after Fields

Parliament of the United Kingdom
New constituency	Member of Parliament for Liverpool Broadgreen; 1983–1992	Succeeded by Jane Kennedy
