= James Stock =

James Stock may refer to:

- James H. Stock (born 1955), American economist
- James Henry Stock (1855–1907), British Member of Parliament for Liverpool Walton
