= Mossley Hill (Liverpool ward) =

Metropolitan borough council ward in England

Coordinates: 53.3789°N 2.921°W

- Mossley Hill ward within Liverpool
- Population: 5,529 (2021 census)
- Registered Electors: 4,084 (2023 elections)
- Metropolitan borough: City of Liverpool
- Metropolitan county: Merseyside
- Region: North West
- Country: England
- Sovereign state: United Kingdom
- UK Parliament: Liverpool Wavertree
- Councillors: Rob McAllister-Bell (Liberal Democrats)

Mossley Hill is an electoral division of Liverpool City Council in the Liverpool Wavertree Parliamentary constituency.

== Background ==
The ward was first formed for the 2004 municipal elections and its boundaries were changed for the 2023 elections.

=== 2004 ward ===
2004 Mossley Hill ward

The ward was created from the former Grassendale and Aigburth wards.

The population of the ward at the 2021 census was 12,041.

=== 2023 ward ===
The ward boundaries were changed in 2023 following a review by the Local Government Boundary Commission for England which decided that the existing 30 wards each represented by three Councillors should be replaced by 64 wards represented by 85 councillors with varying representation by one, two or three councillors per ward.

The Mossley Hill ward was recreated as a single-member ward, taking the eastern half of the former Mossley Hill ward and a small portion of the former Cressington ward. The ward boundaries follow Elmswood Road, the West Coast Mainline, behind Lanville Road, Brodie Avenue, Glenhead Road, Aigburth Hall Road, behind The Serpentine, Aigburth Road, behind Barkhill Road, and North Sudley Road. The ward includes Sudley House, John Moores University I.M. Marsh Campus, and Mossley Hill railway station.

The population of the ward at the 2021 census was 5,529.

== Councillors ==
Election	Councillor	Councillor	Councillor
2004	Tina Gould (LD)	Ron Gould (LD)	David Antrobus (LD)
2006	Tina Gould (LD)	Ron Gould (LD)	David Antrobus (LD)
2007	Tina Gould (LD)	Ron Gould (LD)	David Antrobus (LD)
2008	Tina Gould (LD)	Ron Gould (LD)	Lynnie Williams (LD)
2010	Tina Gould (LD)	Ron Gould (LD)	Lynnie Williams (LD)
2011	Tina Gould (LD)	Patrick Hurley (Lab)	Lynnie Williams (Lab)
2012	Tina Gould (LD)	Patrick Hurley (Lab)	Emily Spurrell (Lab)
2014	Andrew Foxley (Lab)	Patrick Hurley (Lab)	Emily Spurrell (Lab)
2015	Andrew Foxley (Lab)	Patrick Hurley (Lab)	Emily Spurrell (Lab)
2016	Andrew Foxley (Lab)	Patrick Hurley (Lab)	Emily Spurrell (Lab)
2018	Elizabeth Hayden (Lab)	Patrick Hurley (Lab)	Emily Spurrell (Lab)
2019	Elizabeth Hayden (Lab)	Patrick Hurley (Lab)	Emily Spurrell (Lab)
2021	Elizabeth Hayden (Lab)	Patrick Hurley (Lab)	Rob McAllister-Bell (LD)
WARD REFORMED
2023	Rob McAllister-Bell (LD)		

indicates seat up for re-election after boundary changes.

indicates seat up for re-election.

indicates change in affiliation.

indicates seat up for re-election after casual vacancy.

Lynnie Hinnigan (née Williams) was elected for the Liberal Democrats in 2008 and defected to Labour in 2011, she then stood aside from the ward at the next election where a new Labour councillor was elected.

== Election results ==
=== Elections of the 2020s ===
4th May 2023
Party	Candidate	Votes	%	±%
**Liberal Democrats**	**Robert McAllister-Bell**	**1,086**	**59.83**	
Labour	Graeme Cooper	443	24.41	
Green	Martin Sydney Dobson	235	12.95	
Conservative	Simon Joseph Murray	51	2.81	
Majority		843	35.42	
Registered electors		4,084		
Turnout		1,815	44.44	
Rejected ballots		10	0.55	
Total ballots		1,825	44.69	
Liberal Democrats **win** (new seat)				

Liverpool City Council Municipal Elections: 6th May 2021
Party	Candidate	Votes	%	±%
**Liberal Democrats**	**Robert Charles McAllister-Bell**	**2,160**	**46.95%**	**▲13.60**
Labour	Helen Patricia Stephens	1,510	32.83%	▼9.90
Green	Julian Garfield Todd	641	13.95%	▼3.91
Conservative	Millie Gore	192	4.17%	▲0.11
Liberal	David Stanley Wood	98	2.13%	▲0.10
Majority		650	14.13%	▲4.76
Turnout		4,601	50.38%	▲7.16
Registered electors		9,131		▼3.42
Rejected ballots		84	1.82%	▲1.07
Liberal Democrats **gain** from Labour		Swing	▲11.75	

=== Elections of the 2010s ===
Liverpool City Council Municipal Elections: 2nd May 2019
Party	Candidate	Votes	%	±%
**Labour**	**Patrick Hurley**	**1,746**	**42.72%**	**▼2.92**
Liberal Democrats	Robert Charles McAllister-Bell	1,363	33.35%	▼1.69
Green	Ted Grant	729	17.84%	▲7.29
Conservative	Christopher Andrew Roland	166	4.06%	▼2.17
Liberal	David Stanley Wood	83	0.51%	▼0.51
Majority		383	9.37%	▼1.22
Turnout		4,118	43.55%	▼0.86
Registered electors		9,455		
Rejected ballots		31	0.75%	▲0.58
Labour **hold**		Swing	▼0.61	

Liverpool City Council Municipal Elections: 3rd May 2018
Party	Candidate	Votes	%	±%
Labour	**Elizabeth Hayden**	**1,904**	**45.64%**	▲3.05
Liberal Democrats	Alisha Lewis	1,462	35.04%	▲5.10
Green	Ted Grant	440	10.55	▼9.18
Conservative	Chris Hall	260	6.23%	▲0.37
Liberal	David Stanley Wood	106	2.54%	▲0.66
Majority		442	10.59%	▼1.92
Turnout		4,179	44.41%	▼0.80
Registered electors		9,410		
Rejected ballots		7	0.17%	
Labour **hold**		Swing	▼1.03	

Liverpool City Council Municipal Elections 2016: 5th May 2016
Party	Candidate	Votes	%	±%
Labour	**Emily Spurrell**	**1876**	42.59%	−3.75%
Liberal Democrats	Paul Phillip Childs	1319	29.94%	+16.31%
Green	Ted Grant	869	19.73%	−5.55%
Conservative	Christopher Matthew Hall	258	5.86%	−6.42%
Liberal	David Stanley Wood	83	1.88%	=0.51%
Majority		557	12.51%	−8.91%
Turnout		4453	45.21%	−30.31%
Labour **hold**		Swing	-10.03%	

Liverpool City Council Municipal Elections 2015: 7th May 2015
Party	Candidate	Votes	%	±%
Labour	**Patrick Hurley**	**3411**	46.34%	+4.26%
Green	Martin Jonathan Henshell	1834	24.92%	+6.66%
Liberal Democrats	Paul Phillip Childs	1003	13.63%	−14.67%
Conservative	Chris Hall	904	12.28%	+2.58%
TUSC	Chris Clayton	108	1.47%	n/a
Liberal	David Stanley Wood	101	1.37%	−0.29%
Majority		1577	21.42%	+7.64%
Turnout		7361	75.52%	+37.41%
Labour **hold**		Swing	%	

Liverpool City Council Municipal Elections 2014: 22nd May 2014
Party	Candidate	Votes	%	±%
Labour	**Andrew Foxley**	**1652**	42.08%	−9.89%
Liberal Democrats	Paul Childs	1111	28.30%	+6.44%
Green	Helen Elizabeth Randall	717	18.26%	+6.21%
Conservative	Christopher Matthew Hall	381	9.70%	−1.49%
Liberal	David Stanley Wood	65	1.66%	−1.27%
Majority		541	13.78%	−16.04%
Turnout		3926	38.11%	−1.03%
Labour **gain** from Liberal Democrats		Swing	-8.17%	

Liverpool City Council Municipal Elections 2012: 3rd May 2012
Party	Candidate	Votes	%	±%
Labour	**Emily Spurrell**	**2109**	**51.97%**	**+3.38%**
Liberal Democrats	Paul Philip Childs	887	21.86%	−9.57%
Green	Francis Adrian Irving	489	12.05%	+3.56%
Conservative	Christopher John Kerr	454	11.19%	+0.46%
Liberal	David Stanley Wood	119	2.93%	+1.70%
Majority		1222	29.82%	+13.14%
Turnout		4098	39.14%	−3.97%
Labour **hold**		Swing	+4.98%	

Liverpool City Council Municipal Elections 2011: 5th May 2011
Party	Candidate	Votes	%	±%
Labour	**Patrick Brian Hurley**	**2187**	**48.11%**	+14.26%
Liberal Democrats	Ron Gould	1429	31.43%	−14.22%
Conservative	Giselle MacDonald	488	10.73%	−2.36%
Green	Heather Brown	386	8.49%	+2.47%
Liberal	David Stanley Wood	56	1.23%	−0.17%
Majority		758	16.68%	+4.87%
Turnout		4546	43.11%	−22.00%
Labour **gain** from Liberal Democrats		Swing	14.24%	

Liverpool City Council Municipal Elections 2010: Mossley Hill
Party	Candidate	Votes	%	±%
Liberal Democrats	**Tina Myrtle Gould**	**3171**	**45.65%**	
Labour	Christopher David Helm	2351	33.85%	
Conservative	Giselle Henrietta Petra McDonald	909	13.09%	
Green	Robert Andrew Smith	418	6.02%	
Liberal	David Stanley Wood	97	1.40%	
Majority		820	11.81%	
Turnout		6946	65.11%	
Liberal Democrats **hold**		Swing		

=== Elections of the 2000s ===
Liverpool City Council Municipal Elections 2008: Mossley Hill
Party	Candidate	Votes	%	±%
Liberal Democrats	**Lynnie Marie Williams**	**1445**	**45.04%**	
Labour	Matthew James Garlick	650	20.26%	
Conservative	Giselle Henrietta Petra McDonald	570	17.77%	
Green	Robert Andrew Smith	403	12.56%	
Liberal	David Stanley Wood	140	4.36%	
Majority				
Turnout		3208	30.51%	
Liberal Democrats **hold**		Swing		

Liverpool City Council Municipal Elections 2007: Mossley Hill
Party	Candidate	Votes	%	±%
Liberal Democrats	**Ron Gould**	**2056**	**62.47**	
Labour	Tristan Taylor	543	16.50%	
Green	Sophy Hansford	348	10.57%	
Conservative	Elizabeth Morton	266	8.08%	
Liberal	David Stanley Wood	78	2.37%	
Majority				
Turnout		3291	31.84%	
Liberal Democrats **hold**		Swing		

Liverpool City Council Municipal Elections 2006: Mossley Hill
Party	Candidate	Votes	%	±%
Liberal Democrats	**Tina Gould**	**1906**	**55.54%**	
Labour	Josephine Lazzari	617	17.98%	
Conservative	Ann Nugent	382	11.13%	
Green	Vicki Anderson	367	10.69%	
Liberal	Patricia Margaret Elmour	160	4.66%	
Majority				
Turnout		3432	32.20%	
Liberal Democrats **hold**		Swing		

After the boundary change of 2004 the whole of Liverpool City Council faced election. Three Councillors were returned.

Liverpool City Council Municipal Elections 2004: Mossley Hill
Party	Candidate	Votes	%	±%
Liberal Democrats	**David Antrobus**	**2685**		
Liberal Democrats	**Ronald Gould**	**2468**		
Liberal Democrats	**Tina Gould**	**2413**		
Labour	Daniel Hughes	783		
Labour	Stephen Bennett	646		
Labour	Benjamin Folley	646		
Green	Vicki Anderson	566		
Conservative	Michael Bunter	405		
Conservative	Kenneth Watkin	386		
Green	Adam Howarth	376		
Conservative	Ann Nugent	375		
Majority				
Turnout		4317	39.95%	
Liberal Democrats **hold**		Swing	n/a	

• italics denotes the sitting Councillor • bold denotes the winning candidate
