= 1991 Liverpool Walton by-election =

UK parliamentary by-election

- 4 July 1991

Constituency of Liverpool Walton
- Turnout: 57.0% (▼16.6%)
	First party	Second party	Third party
Candidate	Peter Kilfoyle	Paul Clark	Lesley Mahmood
Party	Labour	Liberal Democrats	Walton Real Labour
Popular vote	21,317	14,457	2,613
Percentage	53.1%	36.0%	6.5%
Swing	▼11.3%	▲14.8%	New
MP before election
Eric Heffer
Labour
Subsequent MP
Peter Kilfoyle
Labour

The 1991 Liverpool Walton by-election was held on 4 July 1991, following the death of the Labour Party Member of Parliament Eric Heffer for Liverpool Walton, on 27 May.

The constituency had become a safe Labour seat under Heffer, who was known as being on the left of the party and a member of the Campaign Group. The Trotskyist Militant group, using entryist tactics was working within the Labour Party, and had gained control of Liverpool City Council in 1982. The city had become a significant base for the group.

When Heffer announced his retirement, Lesley Mahmood, a "Broad Left" councillor and a member of Militant, stood for the Labour nomination. Peter Kilfoyle, who had been the Labour Party organiser in the city since 1985, gained the nomination by a narrow margin; he had been involved in removing Militant influence from the Liverpool Labour Party. Mahmood stood as a "Walton Real Labour" candidate.

Several other candidates stood. The Liberal Democrat candidate was Paul Clark, a local councillor who had been the Liberal Party candidate in the 1987 general election. The Conservatives, who had little support in the constituency (although they had held it until 1964), stood Berkeley Greenwood. Screaming Lord Sutch stood for the Official Monster Raving Loony Party, and George Lee-Delisle stood on a platform advocating proportional representation.

Kilfoyle was able to win the election, taking a majority of the votes cast (53.1%), although 11.3% down on Heffer's result in the previous general election. The Liberal Democrats gained from the division in the Labour Party and increased their vote to come second. Mahmood was only able to take a distant third place with 6.5% of the vote. The Conservatives were beaten into fourth, for the first time in Britain since the 1983 Bermondsey by-election, and lost their deposit. They did not place fourth in an English by-election again until the 2004 Hartlepool by-election.

Kilfoyle held the seat at the 1992 general election and at each subsequent election, eventually standing down at the 2010 general election.

Some of Militant's leaders, Ted Grant and Rob Sewell, had remained convinced of the merits of entryism and argued privately against Mahmood standing. The candidacy was part of the process in Militant's rejection of entryism, or as they saw it, their open turn, and the expulsion of Grant leading to a split in the group.

== Result ==
Liverpool Walton by-election, 1991
Party	Candidate	Votes	%	±%
Labour	Peter Kilfoyle	21,317	53.1	−11.3
Liberal Democrats	Paul Clark	14,457	36.0	+14.8
Walton Real Labour	Lesley Mahmood	2,613	6.5	N/A
Conservative	Berkeley Greenwood	1,155	2.9	−11.5
Monster Raving Loony	Screaming Lord Sutch	546	1.4	N/A
Independent	George Lee-Delisle	63	0.1	N/A
Majority		6,860	17.1	−26.1
Turnout		40,151	57.0	−16.6
Labour hold		Swing		

== Previous result ==
General election 1987: Liverpool Walton
Party	Candidate	Votes	%	±%
Labour	Eric Heffer	34,661	64.4	+11.7
Liberal	Paul Clark	11,408	21.2	−0.2
Conservative	Iain Mays	7,738	14.4	−10.7
Majority		23,253	43.2	+15.6
Turnout		53,807	73.6	+4.0
Labour hold		Swing	+6.0	
