= Merseyside Police and Crime Commissioner =

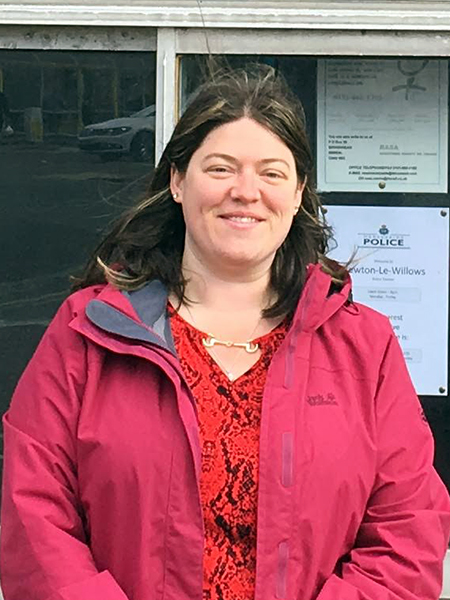
- Incumbent; Emily Spurrell since 13 May 2021
- Police and crime commissioner of Merseyside Police
- Reports to: Merseyside Police and Crime Panel
- Appointer: Electorate of Merseyside
- Term length: Four years
- Constituting instrument: Police Reform and Social Responsibility Act 2011
- Precursor: Merseyside Police Authority
- Inaugural holder: Jane Kennedy
- Formation: 22 November 2012
- Deputy: Deputy Police and Crime Commissioner
- Salary: £88,600
- Website: merseysidepcc.info

The Merseyside Police and Crime Commissioner is the police and crime commissioner, an elected official tasked with overseeing Merseyside Police and setting out the way crime is tackled by the force in the English County of Merseyside. The post was created in November 2012, following an election held on 15 November 2012, and replaced the Merseyside Police Authority. The current incumbent is Emily Spurrell, who was elected on 6 May 2021 and sworn into office on 13 May 2021. Commissioner Spurrell succeeded the inaugural holder, Jane Kennedy.

The Police and Crime Commissioner is required to produce a strategic Police and Crime Plan, setting out the priorities for the Merseyside Police, and their work is scrutinised by the Merseyside Police and Crime Panel, composed of elected councillors from the five local authorities of Merseyside.

== List of Merseyside Police and Crime Commissioners ==
Name	Political Party	Date
Jane Kennedy	Labour	22 November 2012 - March 2019
Jane Kennedy	Independent	March 2019 - 12 May 2021
Emily Spurrell	Labour Co-op	13 May 2021 - present

== Powers and functions ==
The powers and functions of the Merseyside Police and Crime Commissioner are derived from the Police Reform and Social Responsibility Act 2011, replacing those of the Merseyside Police Authority. The main functions are to:

- secure an efficient and effective police force for Merseyside
- appoint the chief constable of Merseyside Police, hold them to account for their running of the force and, if necessary, dismiss them
- set the police and crime objectives for Merseyside through a Police and Crime Plan
- set the annual budget and precept level
- contribute to the national and international policing capabilities set out by the Home Secretary
- bring together community safety and criminal justice partners, to make sure local priorities are joined up

== Election results ==
2024 Merseyside police and crime commissioner election
Party	Candidate	Votes	%	±%
Labour Co-op	Emily Spurrell	152,640	61.7	+4.9
Conservative	Bob Teesdale	35,221	14.2	−8.6
Green	Amanda Onwuemene	31,330	12.7	N/A
Liberal Democrats	Christopher Carubia	28,093	11.4	−5.2
Turnout		251,600	23.9	−7.0
Rejected ballots		4,316	1.7	-1.8
Labour Co-op hold		Swing	6.7	

Merseyside Police and Crime Commissioner election, 2021
Party	Candidate	1st round		2nd round			1st round votesTransfer votes, 2nd round
Party	Candidate	Total	Of round	Transfers	Total	Of round	1st round votesTransfer votes, 2nd round
Labour Co-op	Emily Elizabeth Spurrell	178,875	56.88%				
Conservative	Bob Teesdale	71,961	22.88%				
Liberal Democrats	Kristofor Iain Brown	51,979	16.53%				
Reform	Malcolm James Webster	11,662	4.83%				
Turnout		314,477	29.72%				
Rejected ballots		11,616	3.56%				
Total votes		326,093	30.82%				
Registered electors		1,058,029					
Labour hold							

Merseyside Police and Crime Commissioner election, 2016
Party	Candidate	1st round		2nd round			1st round votesTransfer votes, 2nd round
Party	Candidate	Total	Of round	Transfers	Total	Of round	1st round votesTransfer votes, 2nd round
Labour	Jane Kennedy	186,661	61.76%				
Conservative	David Burgess	54,000	17.87%				
Liberal Democrats	Christopher Carubia	34,625	11.46%				
Green	John Coyne	26,967	8.92%				
Turnout		302,253					
Rejected ballots		11,754	3.74%				
Total votes		325,761					
Registered electors							
Labour hold							

Merseyside Police and Crime Commissioner election, 2012
Party	Candidate	1st round		2nd round			1st round votesTransfer votes, 2nd round
Party	Candidate	Total	Of round	Transfers	Total	Of round	1st round votesTransfer votes, 2nd round
Labour	Jane Kennedy	70,884	56.18%				
Conservative	Geoff Gubb	15,870	12.58%				
Independent	Kiron Reid	14,379	11.40%				
Liberal Democrats	Paula Keaveney	9,192	7.29%				
UKIP	Hilary Jane Jones	8,704	6.90%				
English Democrat	Paul Duane Rimmer	7,142	5.66%				
Turnout		126,171	12.44%				
Rejected ballots		2,915	2.31%				
Total votes		129,086	12.73%				
Registered electors		1,014,183					
Labour win							

== Abolition ==
On 13th November 2025 the Home Secretary Shabana Mahmood MP announced that the roles of the 37 Police and Crime Commissioners in England would be abolished at the end of their terms of office in 2028 when the responsibility will move to elected regional mayors or to council leaders.
