= Liverpool Walton =

Parliamentary constituency in the United Kingdom, 1885 onwards

Coordinates: 53.447°N 2.967°W

Liverpool, Walton
- Borough constituency for the House of Commons
- Interactive map of boundaries since 2024
- Location within North West England
- County: Merseyside
- Electorate: 71,181 (March 2020)
- Major settlements: Fazakerley, Orrell Park, Walton

Current constituency
- Created: 1885
- Member of Parliament: Dan Carden (Labour)
- Seats: One
- Created from: Liverpool

Liverpool Walton is a constituency (Note: A borough constituency (for the purposes of election expenses and type of returning officer)) represented in the House of Commons of the UK Parliament since 2017 by Dan Carden of the Labour Party. (Note: As with all constituencies, the constituency elects one Member of Parliament (MP) by the first past the post system of election at least every five years.)

== Constituency profile ==
Liverpool Walton is an urban and suburban constituency in Merseyside. It covers the neighbourhoods in the north-east of the city of Liverpool, including Walton, Clubmoor, Norris Green, Orrell Park, Fazakerley, Gillmoss and Croxteth. It also includes the village of Aintree, which lies outside the city's boundaries in the Metropolitan Borough of Sefton. Liverpool is a large port city with a history of slave trading and importation of goods for Lancashire's industry. The city underwent economic decline in the 1970s as the docks and manufacturing industries declined in importance, but has experienced regeneration in the 21st century. Aintree is known for its racecourse which hosts the Grand National horse race, one of the country's most popular annual sporting events. Liverpool Walton is a highly-deprived constituency; Croxteth Park has average levels of wealth and is suburban in character, whilst the rest of the constituency falls within the top 10% most-deprived areas in England and consists largely of dense terraced housing and council estates. The average house price is lower than the rest of North West England and less than half the national average.

In general, residents of Liverpool Walton have low levels of education and homeownership, and are less likely to be married compared to the rest of the country. Rates of household income and professional employment are low. A high proportion of residents work in the health and transport sectors. The child poverty rate is higher than the UK-wide figure and a high percentage of residents claim unemployment benefits. Like the rest of Liverpool, the percentage of residents identifying as Christian is high and there is a large population of Catholics due to historic Irish migration. White people made up 92% of the population at the 2021 census. At the local council level, almost all seats in the constituency are represented by the Labour Party, although Orrell Park elected a local independent group. An estimated 51% of voters in Liverpool Walton supported leaving the European Union in the 2016 referendum, similar to the nationwide figure of 52%.

== Boundaries ==
Map of boundaries 2010–2024

=== Historic ===
Liverpool Walton in Lancashire, boundaries used 1974–83

1918–1950: The County Borough of Liverpool wards of Fazakerley, Walton, and Warbreck.

1950–1955: As above plus the civil parish of Aintree in the Rural District of West Lancashire.

1955–1983: The County Borough of Liverpool wards of County, Fazakerley, Pirrie, and Warbreck.

1983–2010: The City of Liverpool wards of Anfield, Breckfield, County, Fazakerley, Melrose, and Warbreck.

2010–2024: The City of Liverpool wards of Anfield, Clubmoor, County, Everton, Fazakerley, and Warbreck.

=== Current ===
Further to the 2023 review of Westminster constituencies which came into effect for the 2024 general election, the constituency was defined as being composed of the following wards of the City of Liverpool as they existed on 1 December 2020:

- The City of Liverpool wards of: Clubmoor; County; Croxteth; Fazakereley; Norris Green; Warbreck.
- The Metropolitan Borough of Sefton ward of Molyneux (polling districts C4, C5 and C6).

The constituency was subject to significant change, with the addition of the (former) wards of Croxteth and Norris Green from Liverpool West Derby and the Aintree district in the Sefton Borough ward of Molyneux from Sefton Central. These were partly offset by the transfer of the Anfield and Everton wards to Liverpool Riverside.

Liverpool was subject to a comprehensive local government boundary review which came into effect in May 2023. As a result, the new constituency boundaries do not align with the revised ward boundaries. The constituency now comprises the following wards or part wards from the 2024 general election:

- The City of Liverpool wards or part wards of: Clubmoor East; Clubmoor West; County; Croxteth; Croxteth Country Park; Fazakerley East; Fazakerley North; Fazakerley West; Norris Green; Orrell Park; Tuebrook Larkhill (part); Walton; West Derby Muirhead (small part).
- Part of the Metropolitan Borough of Sefton ward of Molyneux^{1}.

^{1} Renamed Aintree and Maghull South ward from May 2026, further to a local government boundary review in Sefton.

The constituency is one of five covering the city of Liverpool and covers the north of the city, taking in the communities of Walton, Clubmoor, Orrell Park, Fazakerley, Croxteth and Norris Green. It also includes the village of Aintree, along with the eponymous racecourse, which are situated in the Borough of Sefton.

== History ==
Created by the Redistribution of Seats Act 1885, Liverpool Walton has been held by the Labour Party since the 1964 general election, and is the party's safest seat by size of majority. In 2010 and 2015, it had the largest Labour majority in the country by percentage terms. Labour has won over 70% of the vote at every general election in the Walton constituency since 1992, although for many years it was looked on as a reasonably safe Conservative seat. Until 1964, Labour had only gained Walton once, at their landslide victory after the Second World War in 1945. Like other seats in Merseyside, the Conservative Party's share of the vote declined rapidly during the 1990s, and Conservative candidates failed to poll in second place from 1997 until 2017. From 1964 until his death in 1991, the seat was held by the notable left-winger Eric Heffer; the subsequent by-election was won by Peter Kilfoyle, who held the seat until 2010. Steve Rotheram won the seat in 2010 after Kilfoyle stood down.

At both the 2010 and 2015 general elections, Liverpool Walton saw the highest share of the vote for a winning candidate in the country, and in the latter election, the 81.3% of the vote won by Rotheram was the highest of any candidate in an election in the UK since 1997.

In 2015, Liverpool Walton was the only constituency in England where the Conservative candidate (Norsheen Bhatti) lost their deposit.

In May 2017, Steve Rotheram was elected as Mayor of the Liverpool City Region and chose not to stand for re-election as an MP at the 2017 general election held one month later. In that election, the seat was won by the Labour candidate Dan Carden with the highest vote share for any Labour candidate nationally at 85.7%.

== Members of Parliament ==
Election	Member	Party
1885	John George Gibson	Conservative
1888 by-election	Miles Walker Mattinson	Conservative
1892	James Henry Stock	Conservative
1906	F. E. Smith	Conservative
1918	Warden Chilcott	Conservative
1929	Reginald Purbrick	Conservative
1945	James Haworth	Labour
1950	Kenneth Thompson	Conservative
1964	Eric Heffer	Labour
1991 by-election	Peter Kilfoyle	Labour
2010	Steve Rotheram	Labour
2017	Dan Carden	Labour

== Elections ==
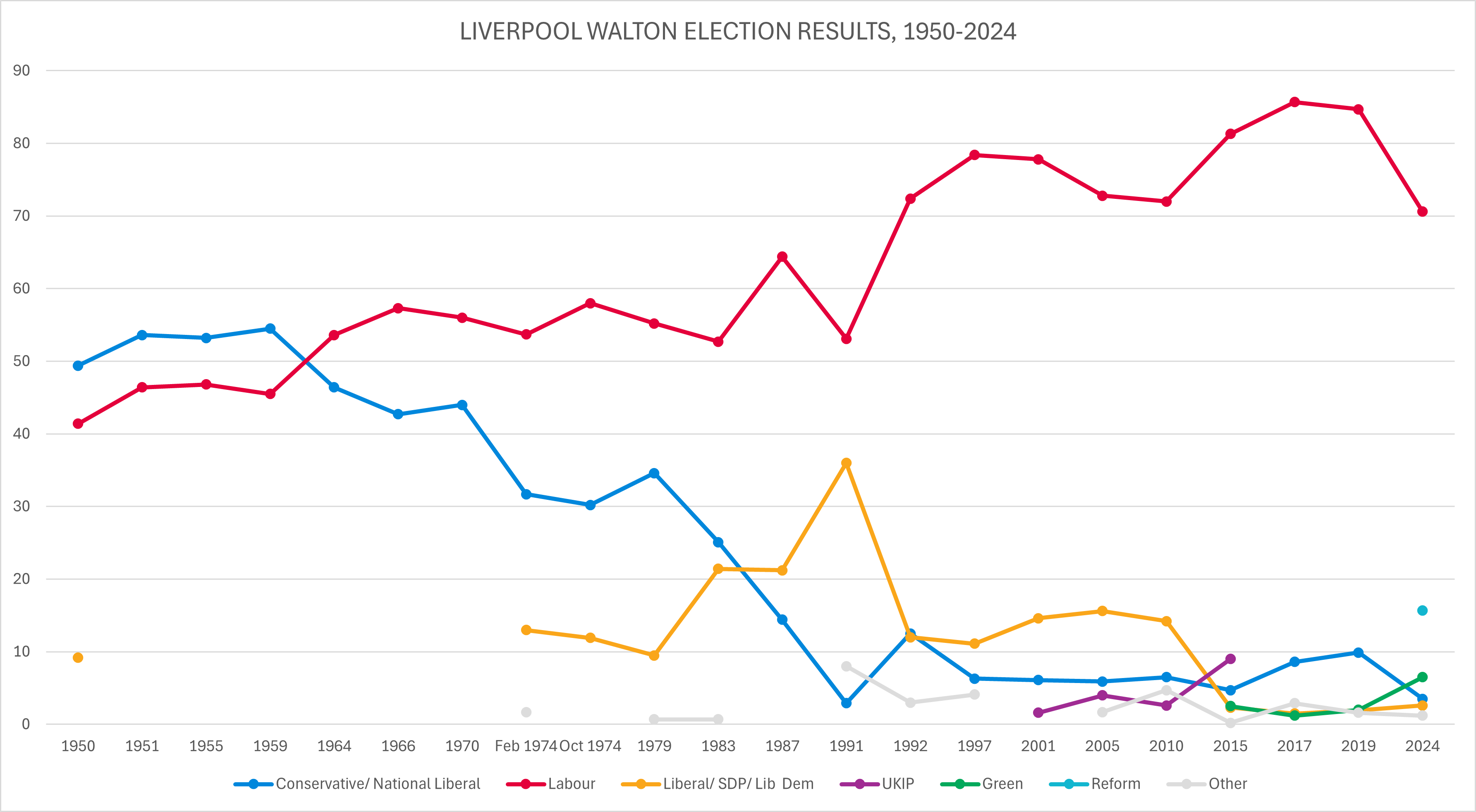
Election results 1983–2024

=== Elections in the 2020s ===
General election 2024: Liverpool Walton
Party	Candidate	Votes	%	±%
Labour	Dan Carden	26,032	70.6	−11.8
Reform	Joe Doran	5,787	15.7	+13.5
Green	Martyn Madeley	2,388	6.5	+4.7
Conservative	Emma Ware	1,282	3.5	−6.4
Liberal Democrats	Sean Cadwallader	945	2.6	+0.3
Liberal	Billy Lake	452	1.2	−0.2
Majority		20,245	54.9	−19.9
Turnout		36,886	53.2	−11.9
Labour hold		Swing		

=== Elections in the 2010s ===
General election 2019: Liverpool Walton
Party	Candidate	Votes	%	±%
Labour	Dan Carden	34,538	84.7	−1.0
Conservative	Alex Phillips	4,018	9.9	+1.3
Green	Ted Grant	814	2.0	+0.8
Liberal Democrats	David Newman	756	1.9	+0.4
Liberal	Billy Lake	660	1.6	New
Majority		30,520	74.8	−2.3
Turnout		40,786	65.1	−2.2
Labour hold		Swing	−1.1	

In percentage terms, Carden's vote share and majority were unmatched by any candidate in any constituency at the 2019 election, although higher turnouts and larger electorates saw fifteen other MPs – twelve Labour in London and one in Merseyside, and three Conservatives in Lincolnshire and Essex — win with bigger numerical majorities.

General election 2017: Liverpool Walton
Party	Candidate	Votes	%	±%
Labour	Dan Carden	36,175	85.7	+4.4
Conservative	Laura Evans	3,624	8.6	+3.9
Independent	Terry May	1,237	2.9	New
Liberal Democrats	Kris Brown	638	1.5	−0.8
Green	Colm Feeley	523	1.2	−1.3
Majority		32,551	77.1	+4.8
Turnout		42,197	67.3	+6.2
Labour hold		Swing	+0.3	

General election 2015: Liverpool Walton
Party	Candidate	Votes	%	±%
Labour	Steve Rotheram	31,222	81.3	+9.3
UKIP	Steven Flatman	3,445	9.0	+6.4
Conservative	Norsheen Bhatti	1,802	4.7	−1.8
Green	Jonathan Clatworthy	956	2.5	New
Liberal Democrats	Patrick Moloney	899	2.3	−11.9
Independent	Alexander Karran	56	0.1	New
The Pluralist Party	Jonathan Bishop	23	0.1	New
Majority		27,777	72.3	+14.5
Turnout		38,403	61.1	+6.3
Labour hold		Swing	+1.5	

General election 2010: Liverpool Walton
Party	Candidate	Votes	%	±%
Labour	Steve Rotheram	24,709	72.0	+0.2
Liberal Democrats	Patrick Moloney	4,891	14.2	−2.7
Conservative	Adam Marsden	2,241	6.5	+0.6
BNP	Peter Stafford	1,104	3.2	New
UKIP	Joseph Nugent	898	2.6	−0.7
CPA	John Manwell	297	0.9	New
TUSC	Darren Ireland	195	0.6	New
Majority		19,818	57.8	+3.0
Turnout		34,335	54.8	+8.1
Labour hold		Swing	+1.5	

=== Elections in the 2000s ===
General election 2005: Liverpool Walton
Party	Candidate	Votes	%	±%
Labour	Peter Kilfoyle	20,322	72.8	−5.0
Liberal Democrats	Kiron Reid	4,365	15.6	+1.0
Conservative	Sharon Buckle	1,655	5.9	−0.2
UKIP	Joseph Moran	1,108	4.0	+2.4
Liberal	Daniel J. Wood	480	1.7	New
Majority		15,957	57.2	−6.0
Turnout		27,930	45.0	+2.0
Labour hold		Swing	−3.0	

General election 2001: Liverpool Walton
Party	Candidate	Votes	%	±%
Labour	Peter Kilfoyle	22,143	77.8	−0.6
Liberal Democrats	Kiron Reid	4,147	14.6	+3.5
Conservative	Stephen Horgan	1,726	6.1	−0.2
UKIP	Paul Forrest	442	1.6	New
Majority		17,996	63.2	−4.1
Turnout		28,458	43.0	−16.5
Labour hold		Swing	−2.1	

=== Elections in the 1990s ===
General election 1997: Liverpool Walton
Party	Candidate	Votes	%	±%
Labour	Peter Kilfoyle	31,516	78.4	+6.0
Liberal Democrats	Richard J. Roberts	4,478	11.1	−0.9
Conservative	Mark K. Kotecha	2,551	6.3	−6.2
Referendum	Charles Grundy	620	1.5	New
Socialist	Lesley Mahmood	444	1.1	New
Liberal	Hazel L. Williams	352	0.9	−1.1
ProLife Alliance	Veronica P. Mearns	246	0.6	New
Majority		27,038	67.3	+8.4
Turnout		40,207	59.5	−7.9
Labour hold		Swing		

General election 1992: Liverpool Walton
Party	Candidate	Votes	%	±%
Labour	Peter Kilfoyle	34,214	72.4	+8.0
Conservative	Berkeley Greenwood	5,915	12.5	−1.9
Liberal Democrats	Joseph Lang	5,672	12.0	−9.2
Liberal	Tom Newall	963	2.0	New
Protestant Reformation	David J.E. Carson	393	0.8	New
Natural Law	Dianne Raiano	98	0.2	New
Majority		28,299	59.9	+16.7
Turnout		47,255	67.4	−6.2
Labour hold		Swing	+4.9	

By-election 1991: Liverpool Walton
Party	Candidate	Votes	%	±%
Labour	Peter Kilfoyle	21,317	53.1	−11.3
Liberal Democrats	Paul Clark	14,457	36.0	+14.8
Walton Real Labour	Lesley Mahmood	2,613	6.5	New
Conservative	Berkeley Greenwood	1,155	2.9	−11.5
Monster Raving Loony	Screaming Lord Sutch	546	1.4	New
Independent	George Lee-Delisle	63	0.1	New
Majority		6,860	17.1	−26.1
Turnout		40,151	56.7	−16.9
Labour hold		Swing		

=== Elections in the 1980s ===
General election 1987: Liverpool Walton
Party	Candidate	Votes	%	±%
Labour	Eric Heffer	34,661	64.4	+11.7
Liberal	Paul Clark	11,408	21.2	−0.2
Conservative	Iain Mays	7,738	14.4	−10.7
Majority		23,253	43.2	+15.6
Turnout		53,807	73.6	+4.0
Labour hold		Swing	+6.0	

General election 1983: Liverpool Walton
Party	Candidate	Votes	%	±%
Labour	Eric Heffer	26,980	52.7	−2.5
Conservative	Alan Maddox	12,865	25.1	−11.5
Liberal	David M.B. Croft	10,970	21.4	+11.9
BNP	Donald J.M. McKechnie	343	0.7	New
Majority		14,115	27.6	+6.0
Turnout		51,158	69.6	−3.2
Labour hold		Swing		

=== Elections in the 1970s ===
General election 1979: Liverpool Walton
Party	Candidate	Votes	%	±%
Labour	Eric Heffer	20,231	55.2	−2.5
Conservative	R. Gould	12,673	34.6	+4.4
Liberal	N. Cardwell	3,479	9.5	−2.4
National Front	W.F. Haire	254	0.7	New
Majority		7,558	20.6	
Turnout		36,637	72.8	
Labour hold		Swing	−3.5	

General election October 1974: Liverpool Walton
Party	Candidate	Votes	%	±%
Labour	Eric Heffer	20,568	58.0	
Conservative	R. Gould	10,706	30.2	
Liberal	J. Watton	4,221	11.9	
Majority		9,862	27.79	
Turnout		35,495	68.30	
Labour hold		Swing		

General election February 1974: Liverpool Walton
Party	Candidate	Votes	%	±%
Labour	Eric Heffer	20,057	53.7	
Conservative	R.W. Rollins	11,841	31.7	
Liberal	J. Watton	4,842	13.0	New
National Front	C. Gibbon	647	1.7	New
Majority		8,216	22.0	
Turnout		37,387	72.69	
Labour hold		Swing		

General election 1970: Liverpool Walton
Party	Candidate	Votes	%	±%
Labour	Eric Heffer	20,530	56.0	−1.3
Conservative	Joseph Norton	16,124	44.0	+1.3
Majority		4,406	12.0	
Turnout		36,654	68.0	
Labour hold		Swing	−1.3	

=== Elections in the 1960s ===
General election 1966: Liverpool Walton
Party	Candidate	Votes	%	±%
Labour	Eric Heffer	20,950	57.3	+3.7
Conservative	Kenneth Thompson	15,617	42.7	−3.7
Majority		5,333	14.6	
Turnout		36,567	71.2	−4.4
Labour hold		Swing	+3.7	

General election 1964: Liverpool Walton
Party	Candidate	Votes	%	±%
Labour	Eric Heffer	21,452	53.6	+8.1
Conservative	Kenneth Thompson	18,546	46.4	−8.1
Majority		2,906	7.3	N/A
Turnout		39,998	75.6	
Labour gain from Conservative		Swing	+8.1	

=== Elections in the 1950s ===
General election 1959: Liverpool Walton
Party	Candidate	Votes	%	±%
Conservative	Kenneth Thompson	24,288	54.5	+1.3
Labour	George McCartney	20,254	45.5	−1.3
Majority		4,034	9.1	
Turnout		44,542	77.7	
Conservative hold		Swing		

General election 1955: Liverpool Walton
Party	Candidate	Votes	%	±%
Conservative	Kenneth Thompson	23,851	53.2	
Labour	Joseph Cleary	20,989	46.8	
Majority		2,862	6.4	
Turnout		44,840	75.3	
Conservative hold		Swing		

General election 1951: Liverpool Walton
Party	Candidate	Votes	%	±%
Conservative	Kenneth Thompson	28,014	53.59	
Labour	Ian Isidore Levin	24,262	46.41	
Majority		3,752	7.18	
Turnout		52,276	81.05	
Conservative hold		Swing		

General election 1950: Liverpool Walton
Party	Candidate	Votes	%	±%
Conservative	Kenneth Thompson	26,250	49.40	
Labour	James Haworth	21,983	41.37	
Liberal	Ewart Heywood	4,901	9.22	
Majority		4,267	8.03	N/A
Turnout		53,134	83.07	
Conservative gain from Labour		Swing		

=== Elections in the 1940s ===
General election 1945: Liverpool Walton
Party	Candidate	Votes	%	±%
Labour	James Haworth	18,385	43.61	
Conservative	Reginald Purbrick	15,749	37.35	
Liberal	Ernest Ronald Webster	8,028	19.04	
Majority		2,636	6.26	N/A
Turnout		42,162	69.55	
Labour gain from Conservative		Swing		

=== Elections in the 1930s ===
General election 1935: Liverpool Walton
Party	Candidate	Votes	%	±%
Conservative	Reginald Purbrick	22,623	61.64	
Labour	Frederick Lees McGhee	14,079	38.36	
Majority		8,544	23.28	
Turnout		36,702	64.24	
Conservative hold		Swing		

General election 1931: Liverpool Walton
Party	Candidate	Votes	%	±%
Conservative	Reginald Purbrick	31,135	73.57	
Labour	F. A. P. Rowe	11,183	26.43	
Majority		19,952	47.14	
Turnout		42.318	77.50	
Conservative hold		Swing		

== Election results 1885–1929 ==
=== Elections in the 1880s ===
Birrell

General election 1885: Liverpool Walton
Party	Candidate	Votes	%	±%
Conservative	John George Gibson	3,492	58.3	
Liberal	Augustine Birrell	2,500	41.7	
Majority		992	16.6	
Turnout		5,992	78.0	
Registered electors		7,683		
Conservative win (new seat)				

General election 1886: Liverpool Walton
Party	Candidate	Votes	%	±%
Conservative	John George Gibson	2,872	63.1	+4.8
Liberal	Charles Hamilton Bromby	1,681	36.9	−4.8
Majority		1,191	26.2	+9.6
Turnout		4,553	59.3	−18.7
Registered electors		7,683		
Conservative hold		Swing	+4.8	

Gibson was appointed Solicitor-General for Ireland, requiring a by-election.

By-election, 11 August 1886: Liverpool Walton
Party	Candidate	Votes	%	±%
Conservative	John George Gibson	Unopposed		
Conservative hold				

Gibson resigned after being appointed a Judge of the Queen's Bench Division in the High Court of Justice in Ireland, causing a by-election.

By-election, 3 February 1888: Liverpool Walton
Party	Candidate	Votes	%	±%
Conservative	Miles Walker Mattinson	Unopposed		
Conservative hold				

=== Elections in the 1890s ===
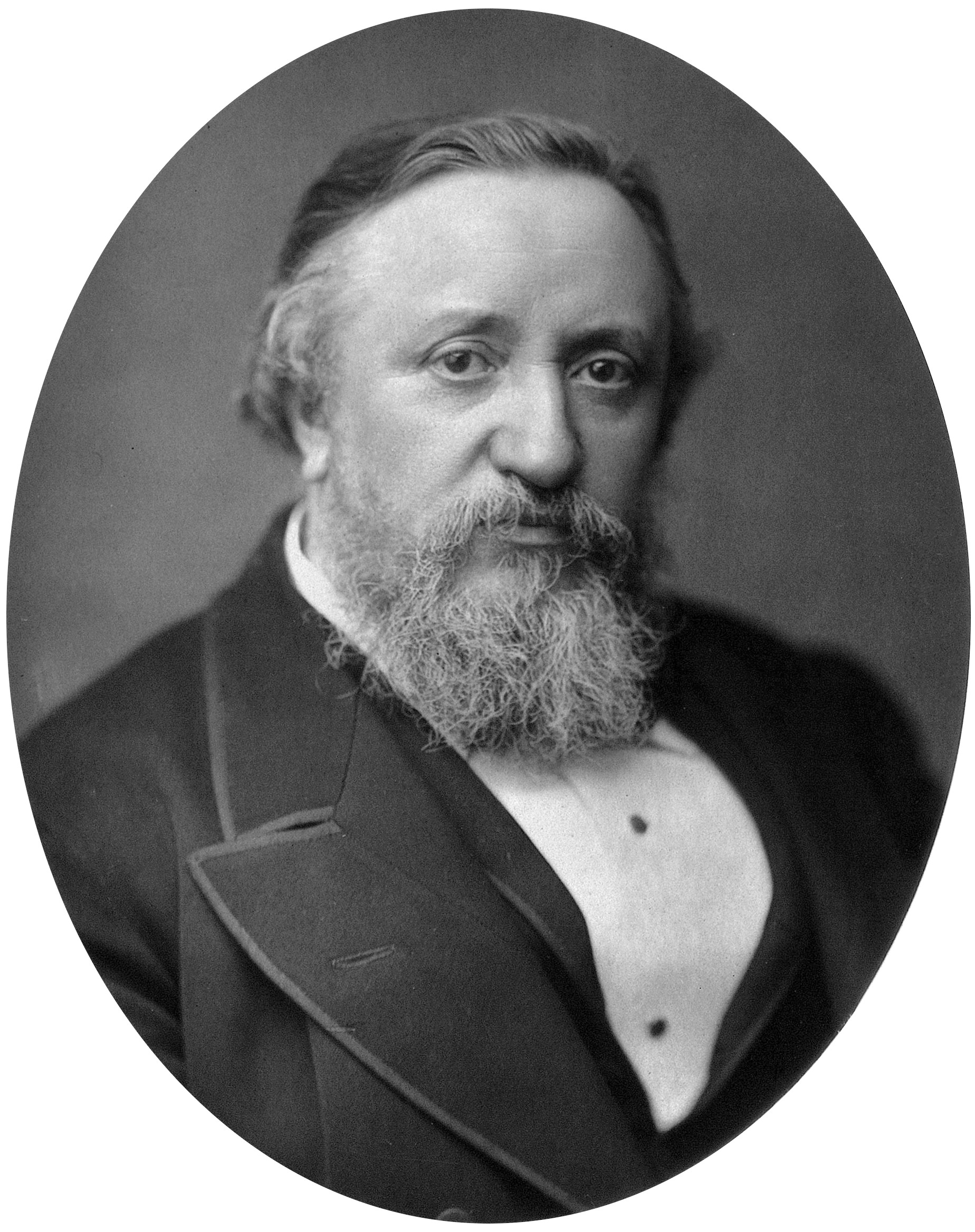
Richardson

General election 1892: Liverpool Walton
Party	Candidate	Votes	%	±%
Conservative	James Henry Stock	3,707	59.8	−3.3
Liberal	Benjamin Ward Richardson	2,493	40.2	+3.3
Majority		1,214	19.6	−6.6
Turnout		6,200	68.9	+9.6
Registered electors		9,004		
Conservative hold		Swing	−3.3	

General election 1895: Liverpool Walton
Party	Candidate	Votes	%	±%
Conservative	James Henry Stock	Unopposed		
Conservative hold				

=== Elections in the 1900s ===
General election 1900: Liverpool Walton
Party	Candidate	Votes	%	±%
Conservative	James Henry Stock	Unopposed		
Conservative hold				

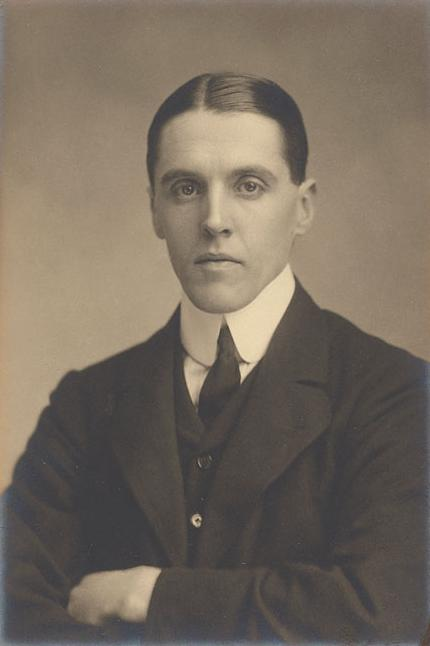
Smith

Jellicoe

General election 1906: Liverpool Walton
Party	Candidate	Votes	%	±%
Conservative	F. E. Smith	5,862	53.2	N/A
Liberal	Edwin Jellicoe	5,153	46.8	New
Majority		709	6.4	N/A
Turnout		11,015	74.0	N/A
Registered electors		14,889		
Conservative hold		Swing	N/A	

=== Elections in the 1910s ===
General election January 1910: Liverpool Walton
Party	Candidate	Votes	%	±%
Conservative	F. E. Smith	6,627	52.6	−0.6
Liberal	Francis L'Estrange Joseph	5,513	43.8	−3.0
Independent Liberal	Edwin Jellicoe	451	3.6	−43.2
Majority		1,114	8.8	+2.4
Turnout		12,591	80.4	+6.4
Conservative hold		Swing	+1.2	

General election December 1910: Liverpool Walton
Party	Candidate	Votes	%	±%
Conservative	F. E. Smith	6,383	55.9	+3.3
Liberal	William Permewan	5,039	44.1	+0.3
Majority		1,344	11.8	+3.0
Turnout		11,422	72.9	−7.5
Conservative hold		Swing		

General Election 1914–15:

Another General Election was required to take place before the end of 1915. The political parties had been making preparations for an election to take place and by July 1914, the following candidates had been selected;

- Unionist: F. E. Smith
- Liberal: Thomas Berridge

General election 1918: Liverpool Walton
Party		Candidate	Votes	%	±%
C	Unionist	Warden Chilcott	11,457	71.4	+15.5
	Labour	Robert Dixon Smith	4,580	28.6	New
Majority			6,877	42.8	+31.0
Turnout			16,037	55.1	−20.8
Registered electors			29,128		
	Unionist hold		Swing	N/A	
C indicates candidate endorsed by the coalition government.

=== Elections in the 1920s ===
General election 1922: Liverpool Walton
Party	Candidate	Votes	%	±%
Unionist	Warden Chilcott	Unopposed		
Unionist hold				

General election 1923: Liverpool Walton
Party	Candidate	Votes	%	±%
Unionist	Warden Chilcott	Unopposed		
Unionist hold				

General election 1924: Liverpool Walton
Party	Candidate	Votes	%	±%
Unionist	Warden Chilcott	13,387	55.3	+12.6
Labour	Tom Gillinder	8,924	36.8	New
Liberal	Samuel Skelton	1,910	7.9	New
Majority		4,463	18.5	N/A
Turnout		24,221	76.9	N/A
Registered electors		31,482		
Unionist hold		Swing	N/A	

General election 1929: Liverpool Walton
Party	Candidate	Votes	%	±%
Unionist	Reginald Purbrick	16,623	42.7	−12.6
Labour	F. A. P. Rowe	16,395	42.2	+5.4
Liberal	Glyn Howard Howard-Jones	5,857	15.1	+7.2
Majority		228	0.5	−18.0
Turnout		38,875	76.0	−0.9
Registered electors		51,175		
Unionist hold		Swing	−9.0	

== See also ==
- List of parliamentary constituencies in Merseyside
