= Miles Walker Mattinson =

British politician and barrister (1854–1944)

Sir Miles Walker Mattinson KC
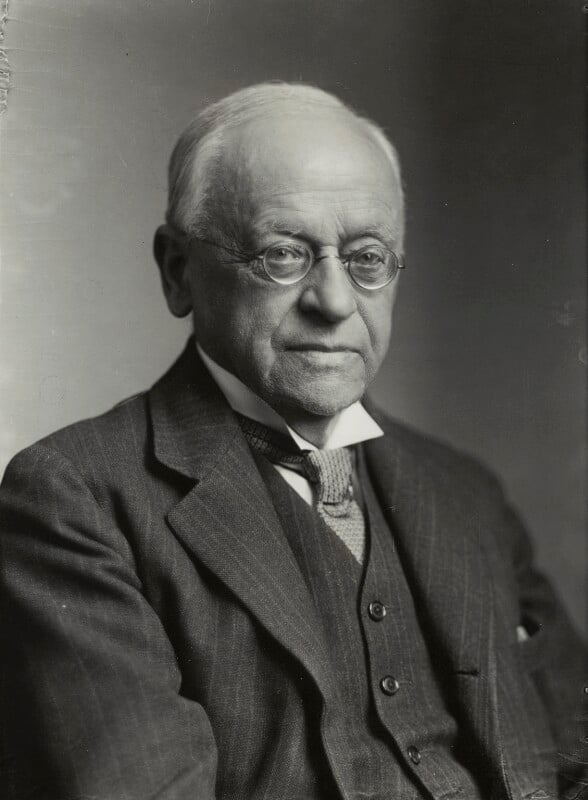
- Mattinson, 1920s

Chair of the House of Commons Finance Committee
- In office 1894 – 1922

Member of Parliament for Liverpool Walton
- In office 3 February 1888 – 1892
- Preceded by: John George Gibson
- Succeeded by: James Henry Stock

Personal details
- Born: 26 December 1854 Newcastle upon Tyne, England
- Died: 29 February 1944 (aged 89)
- Party: Conservative
- Occupation: Barrister

Sir Miles Walker Mattinson KC (26 December 1854 – 29 February 1944) was an English barrister and Conservative MP for Liverpool Walton.

Mattinson was born in Newcastle upon Tyne, the son of Thomas Mattinson. In 1874, he obtained the Bacon scholarship at Gray's Inn, and the following year, the Inns of Court studentship in jurisprudence. In 1877, he won the Arden scholarship and was called to the Bar. In 1897, he took silk.

At the dissolution of parliament in April 1880, Mattinson unsuccessfully stood for Carlisle, followed by two more unsuccessful attempts in Dumfries Burghs in 1885 and in 1886. On his fourth attempt, he was returned unopposed at a by-election to Liverpool Walton in 1888, but stood down at the next general election in 1892. He stood unsuccessfully for the Conservatives in Bolton (UK Parliament constituency) in 1910.

Following his political career, Mattinson devoted himself to company law and financial regulations. From 1894 to 1922, he was chairman of the Finance Committee. He joined Ellerman Lines and in 1933, following the death of Sir John Ellerman, 1st Baronet, Mattinson took control of the company.

He was knighted by George V on 19 December 1922.

== Books ==
- The law relating to corrupt and illegal practices at Parliamentary, municipal and other elections, and the practice on election petitions, with an appendix of statutes, rules and forms (1892). Publisher London : Waterlow and Sons.
- The law relating to corrupt practices at elections and the practice on election petitions with an appendix of statutes, rules and forms(1883). Publisher London : Waterlow.
- A selection of precedents of pleading under the Judicature acts in the common law divisions. With notes explanatory of the different causes of action and grounds of defence; and an introductory treatise on the present rules and principles of pleading as illustrated by the various decisions down to the present time (1878). Publisher London : Stevens and Haynes.

Parliament of the United Kingdom
Preceded by John George Gibson	Member of Parliament for Liverpool Walton; 3 February 1888 – 1892	Succeeded by James Henry Stock
