= Sir Kenneth Thompson, 1st Baronet =

Sir Kenneth Thompson 1st Baronet

Baronet of Walton-on-the-Hill
- In office 1963–1984

Member of Parliament for Liverpool Walton
- In office 23 February 1950 – 25 September 1964
- Preceded by: James Haworth
- Succeeded by: Eric Heffer

Personal details
- Born: Kenneth Pugh Thompson; 24 December 1909
- Died: 4 January 1984 (aged 74)
- Party: Conservative

Sir Kenneth Pugh Thompson, 1st Baronet (24 December 1909 – 4 January 1984) was a British company director and politician from Liverpool. He served fourteen years in Parliament but is most known for his contribution to local government where he was chairman of Merseyside County Council and deputy chairman of the Merseyside Development Corporation. He had a son, Sir Paul Thompson and a daughter, Patricia, with his wife, Lady Nanne Thompson.

== Early life ==
Thompson was born in Liverpool and went to Bootle Grammar School. Rather than go to university he became a newspaper reporter for several years, and then went into commerce. During the 1930s he was a lecturer for the pro-free market Economic League. He was also an active member of the Conservative Party and in 1938 was elected to Liverpool City Council.

== Wartime ==
Due to contracting polio as a child he could not be sent to fight; so during the Second World War Thompson became a civil servant working as a Regional Officer for the Ministry of Information, and remained active in Liverpool. After the end of the war he became a director of several Liverpool companies.

== Politics ==
At the 1950 general election, Thompson was selected to try to regain the Liverpool Walton constituency for the Conservatives after its loss at the previous election. He won the seat back with a majority of more than 4,000. Thompson retained his seat on Liverpool City Council despite his entrance on the national political stage.

He proved a popular Member and was chosen as Secretary of the 1922 Committee after the 1951 election. Thompson's commercial experience was drawn on when he was brought into negotiations on trade with Brazil, which eventually led to a successful reopening of commercial relations. In 1956 he was made Chairman of the Conservative National Advisory Committee on Local Government.

== Government ==
In 1957 Thompson was brought into the government as Assistant Postmaster General. No longer able to afford the time, he gave up his seat on Liverpool City Council at the next election in 1958. After the 1959 general election he was promoted to be Parliamentary Secretary to the Ministry of Education. Thompson left the government in Harold Macmillan's "Night of the Long Knives" reshuffle in July 1962. The next year he received a Baronetcy.

== Defeat ==
Liverpool as a whole showed a strong swing to the Labour Party at the 1964 general election and Thompson lost his seat to the Labour left-winger Eric Heffer. He wrote a volume of memoirs called "Member's Lobby" in 1966, followed by "Pattern of Conquest" the next year. He returned to business but remained involved in politics, and in 1973 was elected to the newly created Merseyside County Council.

== Merseyside ==
Thompson was chosen to lead the Conservative group in 1974. In the 1977 elections, the Conservatives won majority control and from 1977 to 1981 Thompson served as chairman of the council. When the Thatcher government created in 1980 the Merseyside Development Corporation to regenerate the area, Thompson was appointed as deputy chairman. He received an honorary Doctor of Laws degree from the University of Liverpool in 1982.

== Arms ==
Coat of arms of Sir Kenneth Thompson, 1st Baronet

Crest
A demi figure affronty representing Neptune wreathed about the middle with laver Proper the mantle Gules clasped and crowned with an antique crown Or supporting in the dexter hand a trident Sable and in the sinister a spear Proper.
Escutcheon
Per fess dancetty Argent and Sable of two upward one downward points each ending in a cross potent three swans one in chief and two in base counterchanged.
Motto
Loyalty

Parliament of the United Kingdom
Preceded by James Haworth	Member of Parliament for Liverpool Walton; 1950 – 1964	Succeeded by Eric Heffer
Baronetage of the United Kingdom
New creation	Baronet (of Walton-on-the-Hill); 1963 – 1984	Succeeded by Paul Anthony Thompson
