= Emily Spurrell =

British politician (born 1987)

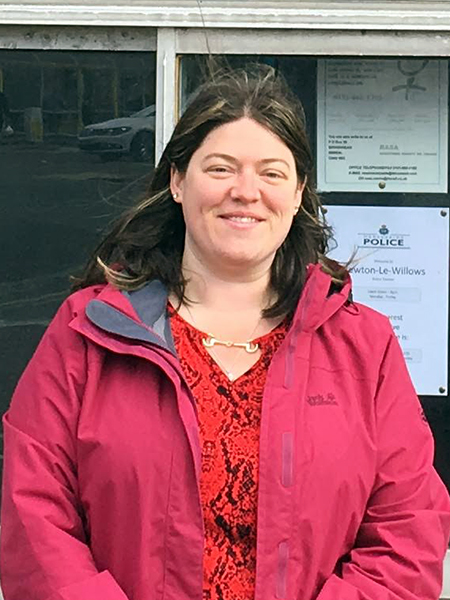
- Spurrell in 2019

Police and Crime Commissioner for Merseyside
- Incumbent
- Assumed office 13 May 2021
- Preceded by: Jane Kennedy

Deputy Police and Crime Commissioner for Merseyside
- In office September 2017 – 18 March 2019
- Commissioner: Jane Kennedy
- Preceded by: Sue Murphy
- Succeeded by: Jeanie Bell

Member of Liverpool City Council for Mossley Hill
- In office 3 May 2012 – 6 May 2021
- Preceded by: Lynnie Williams
- Succeeded by: Rob McAllister-Bell

Personal details
- Born: Emily Elizabeth Spurrell; 1 November 1987 (age 38) Greater Manchester, England
- Party: Labour Co-op
- Education: University of Leeds (BA)
- Website: Official website

Emily Elizabeth Spurrell (born 1 November 1987) is a British politician serving as Police and Crime Commissioner for Merseyside since 2021. A member of the Labour Party and Co-operative Party, she served as a member of Liverpool City Council from 2012 to 2021.

== Councillor ==
At the 2012 Liverpool City Council election Spurrell contested the Mossley Hill ward in south Liverpool, comfortably taking the seat from the Liberal Democrats with 51.97% of the vote. She was re-elected to represent the Mossley Hill ward in 2016 and continued to do so until the delayed May 2021 elections which she did not recontest.

In 2014 she was appointed as a Mayoral Lead for Community Safety before being appointed as the Cabinet Member for Community and Safer Neighbourhoods until 2017. During this time, she oversaw the development of a Domestic Abuse Strategy, instigated a new approach to community cohesion and chaired the CitySafe Board which provided funding to local groups to improve community safety. She also helped Liverpool to secure Purple Flag status, recognising the city’s safe and vibrant night time economy. From 2019 she was a member of the Merseyside Fire and Rescue Authority.

== Police and Crime Commissioner ==
In 2017 she was appointed as the Deputy Police and Crime Commissioner for Merseyside by Jane Kennedy. As Deputy PCC, she championed victims and led on work to tackle violence against women and girls. She developed a scheme to engage employers in tackling domestic abuse, re-launched the modern slavery and trafficking network, initiated a project to investigate experiences of sexual violence across Merseyside, successfully lobbied for all police staff to be paid the living wage and developed an action plan to better support women offenders.

Spurrell resigned as Deputy PCC in March 2019 following Kennedy's resignation from the Labour Party. She was then appointed as an adviser on tackling violence against women and girls to the Metro Mayor of the Liverpool City Region.

In May 2019 Spurrell launched her campaign to be the Labour Party candidate for Merseyside in the 2020 Police and Crime Commissioner elections. Jane Kennedy, who was continuing to sit as an Independent, had announced that she would not be seeking re-election. Spurrell was opposed in the Labour Party selection by former Bedfordshire Police and Crime Commissioner, Olly Martins. In September 2019 the Labour Party announced that following a ballot of local party members Spurrell had succeeded in becoming the Labour Party Candidate for the PCC elections

The elections scheduled for 7 May 2020 were delayed for 12 months in response to the COVID-19 pandemic and were rescheduled to 6 May 2021. During this time Spurrell volunteered in the community and at food banks. In May 2021 Spurrell was elected in the first round with 56.88% of the vote and took her oath of office on 13 May 2021, beginning her term as PCC.

Her three main priorities during the election campaign were visible and accountable policing, supporting victims and communities and a fair and effective criminal justice system. Within her manifesto, she pledged to introduce police scrutiny panels, hold regular public meetings with the Chief Constable, and give victims a louder voice by establishing a Victims’ Panel. She has also been outspoken on the importance of tackling Violence against Women and Girls.

Spurrell is the chair of the Merseyside Criminal Justice Board, is the National Association of Police and Crime Commissioners' Deputy Lead for Mental Health and Custody and Criminal Justice and a Director of the Independent Custody Visitors Association.

She was elected to a second term as Police and Crime Commissioner in May 2024, having received more than four times as many votes as the second-placed candidate, Conservative Bob Teesdale.

=== Liverpool City Region Combined Authority ===
As police and crime commissioner for Merseyside (which covers 5 of the 6 boroughs of the Liverpool city region) Spurrell is a Co-Opted (non voting) member of the Liverpool City Region Combined Authority by virtue of her office.

Spurrell was separately appointed by Mayor Steve Rotheram to the position of Cabinet Member for Crime and Policing in the Liverpool City Region Cabinet.

== Electoral history ==
Trafford Metropolitan Borough Council Elections 2008, Hale Barns: 1 May 2008
Party	Candidate	Votes	%	±%
Conservative	Patrick Myers	2,216	72.2%	▲2.4
Liberal Democrats	Sandra Taylor	437	14.2%	▼2.2
Labour	Emily Spurrell	290	9.5%	▲0.4
Green	Andrew Gratton	125	4.1%	▼0.6
Majority		1,779	60.0%	▲6.6
Turnout		3,068	40.3%	▼1.9
Conservative hold		Swing		

Liverpool City Council Elections 2012 Mossley Hill: 3rd May 2012
Party	Candidate	Votes	%	±%
Labour	Emily Elizabeth Spurrell	2,109	51.97%	▲31.71
Liberal Democrats	Paul Philip Childs	887	21.86%	▼23.18
Green	Francis Adrian Irving	489	12.05%	▼0.51
Conservative	Christopher John Kerr	454	11.19%	▼6.58
Liberal	David Stanley Wood	119	2.93%	▼1.43
Majority		1,222	30.11%	
Turnout		4,098	39.53%	▲9.02
Registered electors		10,367		
Labour gain from Liberal Democrats		Swing	27.45	

Liverpool City Council Elections 2016 Mossley Hill: 5th May 2016
Party	Candidate	Votes	%	±%
Labour	Emily Elizabeth Spurrell	1,876	42.59%	▼9.38
Liberal Democrats	Paul Phillip Childs	1319	29.94%	▲8.08
Green	Ted Grant	869	19.73%	▲7.68
Conservative	Christopher Matthew Hall	258	5.86%	▼5.33
Liberal	David Stanley Wood	83	1.88%	▼1.05
Majority		557	12.64	▼17.18
Turnout		4,405	45.21%	▲5.68
Registered electors		9,849		
Labour hold		Swing	-8.73	

Merseyside Police and Crime Commissioner election, 2021
Party	Candidate	1st round		2nd round			1st round votesTransfer votes, 2nd round
Party	Candidate	Total	Of round	Transfers	Total	Of round	1st round votesTransfer votes, 2nd round
Labour Co-op	Emily Elizabeth Spurrell	178,875	56.88%				
Conservative	Bob Teesdale	71,961	22.88%				
Liberal Democrats	Kristofer Iain Brown	51,979	16.53%				
Reform	Malcolm James Webster	11,662	4.83%				
Turnout		314,477	29.72%				
Rejected ballots		11,616	3.56%				
Total votes		326,093	30.82%				
Registered electors		1,058,029					
Labour hold							

2024 Merseyside police and crime commissioner election
Party	Candidate	Votes	%	±%
Labour Co-op	Emily Spurrell	152,640	61.7	+4.9
Conservative	Bob Teesdale	35,221	14.2	−8.6
Green	Amanda Onwuemene	31,330	12.7	N/A
Liberal Democrats	Christopher Carubia	28,093	11.4	−5.2
Turnout		251,600	23.9	−7.0
Rejected ballots		4,316	1.7	-1.8
Labour Co-op hold		Swing	6.7	

Political Offices
Preceded by Jane Kennedy	Merseyside Police and Crime Commissioner; 2021–present	Incumbent
Preceded by Sue Murphy	Deputy Merseyside Police and Crime Commissioner; 2017-2019	Succeeded by vacant
