= F. E. White =

British trade unionist and politician

F. E. White (died 1933) was a British trade unionist, political activist, and two-time candidate for the House of Commons of the United Kingdom.

== Career ==
White worked as a plasterer in Bristol, and joined the National Association of Operative Plasterers (NAOP). He devoted much of his time to the union; in 1922, he was elected to its National Executive Council. In 1926, he began working full-time for the union as its Bristol Branch Secretary. He also served as president of Bristol Trades Council.

White was a supporter of the Labour Party, and he won election to Bristol City Council in 1921. In 1924, the union agreed to sponsor White and W. Coles as Prospective Parliamentary Candidates. While Coles did not find a suitable constituency, White stood in Stroud at the 1929 UK general election. He was unsuccessful, and the union dropped its sponsorship, but White nonetheless stood in Bristol West at the 1931 UK general election.
