= Liverpool Broadgreen =

UK Parliament constituency (1983–1997)

- Former borough constituency for the House of Commons
- County: Merseyside

1983–1997
- Seats: One
- Created from: Liverpool Edge Hill, Liverpool Kirkdale, Liverpool Wavertree and Liverpool West Derby
- Replaced by: Liverpool Wavertree and Liverpool West Derby

Liverpool Broadgreen was a parliamentary constituency centred on the Broadgreen suburb of Liverpool. It returned one Member of Parliament (MP) to the House of Commons of the Parliament of the United Kingdom.

The constituency was created for the 1983 general election, and abolished for the 1997 general election. When the seat was first contested, it was estimated by the BBC and ITN that had it been fought at the previous election in 1979 it would have returned a Conservative MP with majority of 565. However, despite the Conservatives winning the 1983 general election with a landslide majority and Labour's support falling from its 1979 level, Labour won Broadgreen with a majority of 3,800. Labour would go on to win the seat at every election when it was contested although it was always a marginal seat.

== Boundaries ==
The City of Liverpool wards of Broadgreen, Childwall, Kensington, Old Swan, and Tuebrook.

== Members of Parliament ==
| Election | Member | Party |
|---|---|---|
| 1983 | Terry Fields | Labour |
| 1991 | Terry Fields | Independent |
| 1992 | Jane Kennedy | Labour |
| 1997 | constituency abolished | |

== Elections ==
=== Elections in the 1980s ===
General election 1983: Liverpool Broadgreen
| Party | Candidate | Votes | % | ±% |
|---|---|---|---|---|
| Labour | Terry Fields | 18,802 | 40.9 | |
| Conservative | Daniel P. Dougherty | 15,002 | 32.6 | |
| Liberal | Richard Pine | 7,021 | 15.3 | |
| SDP | Dick Crawshaw | 5,169 | 11.2 | |
| Majority | | 3,800 | 8.3 | |
| Turnout | | 45,994 | 72.1 | |
| Labour win (new seat) | | | | |

- Both Crawshaw and Pine were official candidates of their respective local parties and both supported the Alliance between the Liberals and the SDP, however Crawshaw was given endorsement by both national parties.

General election 1987: Liverpool Broadgreen
| Party | Candidate | Votes | % | ±% |
|---|---|---|---|---|
| Labour | Terry Fields | 23,262 | 48.6 | +7.7 |
| Liberal | Richard Pine | 17,215 | 35.9 | +20.6 |
| Conservative | Mark Seddon | 7,413 | 15.5 | −17.1 |
| Majority | | 6,047 | 12.7 | +4.4 |
| Turnout | | 47,890 | 75.9 | +3.8 |
| Labour hold | | Swing | −8.5 | |

=== Elections in the 1990s ===
General election 1992: Liverpool Broadgreen
| Party | Candidate | Votes | % | ±% |
|---|---|---|---|---|
| Labour | Jane Kennedy | 18,062 | 43.2 | −5.4 |
| Liberal Democrats | Rosie Cooper | 11,035 | 26.4 | −9.5 |
| Independent | Terry Fields | 5,952 | 14.2 | New |
| Conservative | Helen Roche | 5,405 | 12.9 | −2.6 |
| Liberal | Steve Radford | 1,211 | 2.9 | New |
| Natural Law | Ann Brennan | 149 | 0.4 | New |
| Majority | | 7,027 | 16.8 | +4.1 |
| Turnout | | 41,814 | 69.6 | −6.3 |
| Labour hold | | Swing | +2.2 | |
