= F. A. P. Rowe =

British barrister

Francis Arnold Polgrean Rowe (17 January 1898 – 27 January 1990) was a British barrister who contested numerous Parliamentary elections.

Born in Penzance, Rowe was educated at the Friars School, Bangor, and then at the University of London. While there, he became the secretary of the university's socialist society, and served on the executive of the Universities Socialist Federation. He became a journalist, writing for numerous publications, and also became active in the Labour Party.

Rowe stood unsuccessfully in Camborne at the 1924 United Kingdom general election, and was then selected for Liverpool Walton, where he stood in 1929 and 1931. Finally, he stood in South Derbyshire at the 1935 United Kingdom general election, taking a very close second place. He remained the Prospective Parliamentary Candidate there until 1944, but no further election was called.

In 1932, Rowe qualified as a barrister, and after World War II, he focused on his legal career.
