= Lesley Mahmood =

British politician

Lesley Elizabeth Mahmood is a British activist and former school teacher and politician. In 1991, Mahmood ran as a candidate for the Liverpool Walton by-election. Her candidacy and election would lead to the departure of the militant arm of the British Labour Party, which commentators suggest pushed the Labour Party more to the right and towards third way politics and New Labour.

== Political career ==
=== Early career ===
Mahmood was elected to the Liverpool City Council in 1987. In 1988, she faced calls to have her removed from the council's race relations committee.

Mahmood was also a major opponent of the poll tax. She was a member of the group known as the Liverpool 29; Labour councillors suspended for opposing the introduction of poll tax in the city. The tax was introducing splitting the local party as party members voted against one another and other abstained. The group considered suing. Mahmood was first suspended, then later expelled, from the Labour Party for her opposition.

=== 1991 Liverpool Walton by-election ===
In 1991, after the death of Eric Heffer, a socialist member of the party, Mahmood put her name forward as a Labour candidate for the Liverpool Walton by-election. Mahmood won a majority of local party members but after the union votes were counted. Peter Kilfoyle became the party's candidate.

In the bye-election, Mahmood ran under the Walton Real Labour banner. She campaigned on the nationalisation of Britain's top 150 companies, including re-nationalisation of previously privitised utility companies. In the ensuing by-election, Kilfoyle won and Mahmood came third.

The result of the bye-election was a factor in purging of the militant arm of the Labour Party. The exit of members pushed the party more to the right and led, in part, to the Labour Party's embrace of Third Way politics. The supporters set up the Militant Labour party and later became the Socialist Party.

=== Later career ===
In January 1992, Mahmood was summoned to court for failure to pay her poll tax. In June of that year, the magistrates court issued her with a liability order.

Mahmood left the Socialist Party in 1998 following disputes over the Euro, trade unions, and the relevance of democratic centralism to modern socialist politics. She became a supporter of the Socialist Solidarity Network.

== Personal life ==
Mahmood was born about 1952. She was a school teacher before she became a city councillor. Mahmood was married with 1 son.
