= James Haworth (politician) =

British politician

James Haworth (1896 – 16 December 1976) was a British Labour politician.

He was a railwayman living in Oswaldtwistle, Lancashire, and active in the Railway Clerks Association. Refused recognition as a conscientious objector in the First World War, he was in Preston Prison (along with Sydney Silverman), and then went to Princetown Work Centre in the erstwhile Dartmoor Prison.

In the 1945 general election he was elected Member of Parliament for Liverpool Walton.

Haworth failed to return to the House of Commons, standing unsuccessfully for Liverpool Walton in the 1950 general election. He was defeated again standing for Chelmsford in the 1951 general election, and for Bolton West in the 1955 general election.

Parliament of the United Kingdom
Preceded by Reginald Purbrick	Member of Parliament for Liverpool Walton; 1945 – 1950	Succeeded by Kenneth Thompson
Trade union offices
Preceded by Percy Morris	President of the Railway Clerks' Association; 1953 – 1956	Succeeded by Ray Gunter
