= James Henry Stock =

British politician

James Henry Stock (17 December 1855 – 14 June 1907) was an English Conservative Party politician.

He was the Member of Parliament (MP) for Liverpool Walton from 1892 to 1906.

Parliament of the United Kingdom
Preceded by Miles Walker Mattinson	Member of Parliament for Liverpool Walton; 1892 – 1906	Succeeded by F. E. Smith
