= Warden Chilcott =

British politician

Lieutenant-Commander Sir Harry Warden Stanley Chilcott, JP, DL (11 March 1871 – 8 March 1942), also known as Warden Chilcott, was Conservative MP for Liverpool Walton. His wife was Beatrice F. Chilcott.

In 1911, Chilcott purchased the Hook Park Estate and surrounding areas in Hampshire from S.W.Hornby Hood, constructing Salterns House and (in 1934) a golf course on the land. The course was auctioned off by his wife, Beatrice, on the 10th of February 1943 following Chilcott's death a year prior. Part of the estate was recquisitioned by HM Government and subsequently used as a base for the Royal Naval Air Service. It was also used as an airbase during the First World War, despite Chilcott's desire to close the preexisting Coast Guard Station (built in 1880-1881). It was purchased by a Mr R Knight and subsequently the Southampton School of Navigation and Warsash College secured a 99-year lease in 1946. In 1965, Southampton University College (of which the Southampton School of Navigaton and Warsash College was part of) secured the freehold of the site.

In 1932, Chilcott published a book, 'Political Salvation' with a foreword by Right Honourable Sir Austen Chamberlain. The Times Literary Supplement stated that the book was "A pioneer in the campaign for national against party government" (20th October 1932).

During the First World War, he served with the Royal Naval Air Service in France. A flamboyant self-made businessman and sportsman, he was elected with the backing of the Coalition government in 1918, was returned unopposed in 1922 and 1923, was elected again in 1924, and stood down in 1929. He was knighted in 1922.

Chilcott was a close friend of both Foreign Secretary Sir Austen Chamberlain and Ivy Chamberlain, the couple's "infatuation" with Chilcott which was "inexplicable to almost everyone". He arranged for Chamberlain to meet foreign statesmen on his yacht Dolphin, including Benito Mussolini, whom both admired. Their relationship was severed in 1935, after Chilcott behaved badly toward the Queen of Spain when Chilcott and the Chamberlains were holidaying in Corsica.

== Sources ==
- British Parliamentary Election Results 1918-1949, FWS Craig
