= Jane Kennedy (politician) =

British Independent politician (born 1958)

The Right Honourable Jane Kennedy
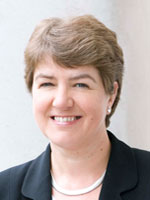
- Kennedy in 2009

Merseyside Police and Crime Commissioner
- In office 22 November 2012 – 12 May 2021
- Preceded by: Office established
- Succeeded by: Emily Spurrell
Ministerial offices
Minister of State for Farming and the Environment
In office 5 October 2008 – 8 June 2009
Prime Minister	Gordon Brown
Preceded by	The Lord Rooker
Succeeded by	Jim Fitzpatrick
Financial Secretary to the Treasury
In office 28 June 2007 – 5 October 2008
Prime Minister	Gordon Brown
Preceded by	John Healey
Succeeded by	Stephen Timms
Minister of State for Quality and Patient Safety
In office 10 May 2005 – 8 May 2006
Prime Minister	Tony Blair
Preceded by	John Hutton
Succeeded by	Andy Burnham
Minister of State for Work
In office 1 April 2004 – 10 May 2005
Prime Minister	Tony Blair
Preceded by	Des Browne
Succeeded by	Margaret Hodge
Minister of State for Northern Ireland
In office 11 June 2001 – 1 April 2004
Prime Minister	Tony Blair
Preceded by	Adam Ingram
Succeeded by	Barry Gardiner
Parliamentary Under-Secretary to the Lord Chancellor's Department
In office 11 October 1999 – 7 June 2001
Prime Minister	Tony Blair
Preceded by	David Lock
Succeeded by	Willy Bach, Baron Bach
Lord Commissioner of the Treasury
In office 28 July 1998 – 11 October 1999
Prime Minister	Tony Blair
Preceded by	John McFall
Succeeded by	Tony McNulty (Note: Office vacant between 11 October 1999 and 12 June 2001.)

Member of Parliament for Liverpool Wavertree Liverpool Broadgreen (1992–1997)
- In office 9 April 1992 – 12 April 2010
- Preceded by: Terry Fields
- Succeeded by: Luciana Berger

Personal details
- Born: Jane Elizabeth Hodgson; 4 May 1958 (age 68) Whitehaven, Cumberland, England
- Party: Independent (since 2019)
- Other political affiliations: Labour (until 2019)
- Spouse: Malcolm Kennedy (1977–1998)
- Relations: Peter Dowling (partner)
- Children: 2
- Education: University of Liverpool

Jane Elizabeth Kennedy (née Hodgson; born 4 May 1958) is a British politician and the inaugural Merseyside Police and Crime Commissioner. She was Member of Parliament (MP) for Liverpool Wavertree, formerly Liverpool Broadgreen, from 1992 to 2010.

Formerly a member of the Government, on 8 June 2009, she returned to the backbenches leaving her position as Minister of State for Farming and the Environment at the Department for Environment, Food and Rural Affairs.

Originally a member of the Labour Party, she left the party in March 2019 after the resignation of her successor, Luciana Berger MP, and the announcement that former Liverpool City councillor Derek Hatton – a former member of the Militant tendency – had been re-admitted to party membership.

== Early life ==
She was born in Whitehaven, Cumberland, and attended Haughton Comprehensive School (now part of the 'Education Village') on Rockwell Avenue in Haughton Le Skerne, then Queen Elizabeth Sixth Form College in Darlington. She studied chemistry at the University of Liverpool from 1976 until 1978, however did not graduate from her studies, deciding to marry and settle with her family in Liverpool. She worked in social care for Liverpool City Council from 1979 to 1988, and in 1988 she became a trade union Area Organiser for the National Union of Public Employees (NUPE) until 1992. In Liverpool she had been active in ending the Militant group's infiltration of the Liverpool Labour Party.

== Member of Parliament ==
Kennedy had been a Member of Parliament since the 1992 general election, when she was elected for the Liverpool Broadgreen constituency. She served as a member of the social security select committee from 1992 to 1994, and in 1995 she was appointed as a Labour whip.

Her constituency was abolished for the 1997 general election, but she was returned to Parliament for the new Liverpool Wavertree constituency. Following Labour's victory in the 1997 election, she served as an assistant government whip until 1998 and as a government whip until 1999, sitting on the House of Commons administration select committee from 1997 until 1999.

On 9 November 2009 she announced she would be standing down at the 2010 general election. It was announced in January 2010 the Wavertree Labour Party had picked Luciana Berger as the candidate to succeed her. This selection caused some controversy because Berger had stayed at Kennedy's home for a period before the selection, a home Kennedy shares with her partner Peter Dowling, the local Labour Party's agent.

=== In government ===
Kennedy was appointed as a junior minister in the Lord Chancellor's Department from 1999 until 2001, when she became a Minister of State in the Northern Ireland Office with responsibility for security and the justice system. Following the suspension of the Northern Ireland Assembly in October 2002, she also became responsible for education and employment in the province. In 2003, she was made a Privy Councillor.

She transferred to the Department for Work and Pensions in 2004 and then to the Department of Health after the 2005 general election, remaining a Minister of State. She left the government on 5 May 2006 during a wide-ranging reshuffle. She was initially thought by journalists to have been sacked; however, she subsequently said she took the opportunity to resign from the government in light of concerns about the impact of the government's policies on the National Health Service.

In Gordon Brown's first government since becoming Prime Minister, Kennedy was appointed as the Financial Secretary to the Treasury, becoming the third ranked minister in the Treasury, taking on the ministerial responsibilities of the old Paymaster General, Dawn Primarolo. On 5 October 2008, Kennedy was promoted to Minister of State at the Department for Environment, Food and Rural Affairs with the portfolio of Farming and the Environment. She resigned that position in June 2009 in protest at Gordon Brown's Leadership.

== Police and Crime Commissioner ==
Kennedy was elected to the post of Merseyside Police and Crime Commissioner on 15 November 2012. She was re-elected in 2016.

== Expenses row ==
In 2009 the Houses of Parliament started publishing MP expenses. Her partner Peter Dowling worked at her office handling research and parliamentary affairs, and was paid out of her parliamentary expenses.

== Personal life ==
Jane married Malcolm Kennedy in 1977 in Knowsley; they divorced in 1998. They have two sons, Robert (born 1978) and Alan (born 1983). She currently lives with her partner Peter Dowling.

== Notes ==
Parliament of the United Kingdom
Preceded by Terry Fields	Member of Parliament for Liverpool Broadgreen; 1992 – 1997	Constituency abolished
New constituency	Member of Parliament for Liverpool Wavertree; 1997 – 2010	Succeeded by Luciana Berger
Political offices
Preceded by John Healey	Financial Secretary to the Treasury; 2007–2008	Succeeded by Stephen Timms
Preceded by The Lord Rooker	Minister of State for Sustainable Food, Farming and Animal Health; 2008–2009	Succeeded by Jim Fitzpatrick
New office	Merseyside Police and Crime Commissioner; 2012–2021	Succeeded by Emily Spurrell
