= Peter Kilfoyle =

British politician

Parliamentary Under-Secretary of State for Defence
- In office 28 July 1999 – 30 January 2000
- Prime Minister: Tony Blair
- Sec. of State: George Robertson; Geoff Hoon
- Preceded by: John Spellar
- Succeeded by: Lewis Moonie

Member of Parliament for Liverpool Walton
- In office 4 July 1991 – 12 April 2010
- Preceded by: Eric Heffer
- Succeeded by: Steve Rotheram

Personal details
- Born: 9 June 1946 (age 80) Liverpool, England
- Party: Labour
- Spouse: Bernadette Slater
- Education: Durham University, Christ's College, Liverpool (now part of Liverpool Hope University)

Peter Kilfoyle (born 9 June 1946) is a British Labour Party politician who was the Member of Parliament (MP) for Liverpool Walton from 1991 to 2010.

== Early life ==
The eleventh of fourteen children born to an Irish Catholic family on Merseyside, Kilfoyle was educated by the Irish Christian Brothers at St. Edward's College in Liverpool; his father died when he was 10 years old. Obtaining 4 A-levels he went to the University of Durham, but left after a year, becoming a labourer for five years. He qualified as a teacher at Christ's College in Liverpool. From 1975 to 1985, he worked as a teacher. From 1986 to 1991, he was North West Regional Organiser for the Labour Party, often involved in dealing with the entryist tactics of the Militant group.

== Parliamentary career ==
Kilfoyle became the Labour Member of Parliament for Liverpool Walton by retaining the seat in a by-election in 1991 following the death of the incumbent Eric Heffer. In 1994, he supported Tony Blair's campaign for the Labour Party leadership in the leadership election following the death of incumbent John Smith.

When Labour returned to government in 1997, Kilfoyle was initially appointed to a role within the Cabinet Office, with a licence to speak out in the media on the Government's behalf, and was later appointed a junior minister in the Ministry of Defence. In 2000 he resigned, asserting that the Blair Government was failing to pay enough attention to Labour's heartlands. He then became a vocal backbench critic of the Government for the remainder of his time in parliament.

On 18 March 2003, Kilfoyle wrote the amendment against war in Iraq and moved the amendment in the debate in the House of Commons. Despite a large rebellion, the combined Government and official Opposition vote sanctioned war. In 2005, Kilfoyle allegedly defied the Official Secrets Act when he was said to have passed on information supposedly detailing then U.S. President George W. Bush's plan to bomb an Arabic TV station.

In 2008, Kilfoyle advocated a Labour Party leadership challenge to Prime Minister Gordon Brown. On 23 February 2010, Kilfoyle announced that he would not seek re-election at the 2010 General Election.

In the 2012 England and Wales police and crime commissioner elections, he stood in the Labour nomination race to represent Merseyside Police; he was defeated for nomination by another former Liverpool MP, Jane Kennedy. In July 2014, he broke with official party policy to come out in support of Scottish independence and the SNP.

== Personal life ==
He married Bernadette Slater on 27 July 1968, and they have five children. He is a patron of the British Heart Foundation following a heart attack in 2006 and quadruple bypass surgery.

== Books ==
- Left behind : lessons from Labour's heartland (Politicos, 2000) ISBN 978-1902301662
- Lies, Damned Lies, and Iraq (Harriman House, 2007) ISBN 978-1905641390
- Labour Pains: How the party I love lost its soul (Biteback, 2010) ISBN 978-1849540353

Parliament of the United Kingdom
Preceded by Eric Heffer	Member of Parliament for Liverpool Walton; 1991 – 2010	Succeeded by Steve Rotheram
