= Eric Heffer =

British politician (1922–1991)

The Right Honourable Eric Heffer

Shadow Secretary of State for Housing and Construction
- In office 31 October 1983 – 26 October 1984
- Leader: Neil Kinnock
- Preceded by: Post created
- Succeeded by: Post abolished

Chairman of the Labour Party
- In office 31 October 1983 – 26 October 1984
- Leader: Neil Kinnock
- Preceded by: Sam McCluskie
- Succeeded by: Alan Hadden

Shadow Minister for Europe
- In office 24 November 1981 – 31 October 1983
- Leader: Michael Foot
- Succeeded by: Robin Cook

Minister of State for Industry
- In office 7 March 1974 – 9 April 1975
- Prime Minister: Harold Wilson
- Preceded by: Tom Boardman
- Succeeded by: Gerald Kaufman

Member of Parliament for Liverpool Walton
- In office 15 October 1964 – 27 May 1991
- Preceded by: Kenneth Thompson
- Succeeded by: Peter Kilfoyle

Personal details
- Born: Eric Samuel Heffer; 12 January 1922 Hertford, England
- Died: 27 May 1991 (aged 69) London, England
- Party: Labour (1939–1941; after 1948)
- Other political affiliations: Communist Party of Great Britain (1941–1948)
- Spouse: Doris Murray (m. 1945)
- Profession: Joiner

Eric Samuel Heffer (12 January 1922 – 27 May 1991) was a British Labour Party politician. He was Labour Member of Parliament for Liverpool Walton from 1964 until his death. Due to his experience as a professional joiner, he made a speciality of the construction industry and its employment practices, but was also concerned with trade union issues in general. He changed his view on the European Economic Community from being an outspoken supporter to an outspoken opponent, and served a brief period in government in the mid-1970s. His later career was dominated by his contribution to debates within the Labour Party and he defended the Liverpool City Council.

== Family and early life ==
Heffer was born in Hertford into a working-class family. His grandfather was a bricklayer and later a railway signalman, and his father was a boot-maker and repairer, although he owned his own business. In later life Heffer proudly declared "I am therefore completely proletarian in background". Heffer's family were members of the high church tendency of the Church of England, and Heffer himself was a choirboy in the local church: it was there that Heffer led his first strike at the age of eight, and, he said, first experienced victimisation by his employer. Despite growing up in the 1930s, his family did not experience much of the economic privations common in other parts of the country. Typically for a working-class boy he attended school at Longmore Senior School, Hertford, only until the age of 14.

=== Working life ===
On leaving school Heffer ran through a series of skilled apprenticeships, including as an electrician, leatherworker and finally a carpenter. He learnt the trade of a joiner, and worked on building sites from the age of 16. This was a skilled trade and when building work was much in demand, he could earn a good wage; but when there were difficulties in the trade, work would dry up. However, his work allowed him time to study and read in his spare time, and Heffer attended courses run by the Workers' Educational Association and at the National Council of Labour Colleges. Heffer was active in the Amalgamated Society of Woodworkers (ASW). During World War II, he served in the Royal Air Force in a maintenance unit at Fazakerley near Liverpool.

=== Communism ===
When the Jarrow March passed through Hertford in 1936 Heffer had gone to see them and the experience had a profound effect upon him. The family often discussed politics at home and he saw his political convictions, support for trade unionism and his religious convictions as part of the same analysis of the world. In 1939 Heffer joined the Labour Party. However, when the Soviet Union was invaded by Nazi forces in 1941, Heffer resigned from Labour and joined the Communist Party of Great Britain; he said that "To me, Stalin was the greatest of men". In the Liverpool Communist Party, Heffer met his future wife Doris. While Communism was attractive to Heffer as an expression of working-class consciousness, he was not attracted to the party's intense control over its members, and was not inclined to defer to the party's dictates. He was a shop steward for his union; when in 1948 he led an unofficial carpenters' strike against the party's wishes, the Communist Party expelled him and he rejoined the Labour Party within six months. The Communist Party tried to persuade Doris Heffer to choose between her husband and the party. She refused and allowed her membership to expire.

=== Socialism ===
Following the war Heffer briefly lived in Hertford again with his parents, and sought election as a Communist candidate for Hertford Urban District Council in 1946, but was defeated. He then settled in Liverpool, where there was a strong working-class community and within it a large group of left-wing workers waiting to be organised. Heffer grew to love his adopted city and supported Everton F.C. He responded to the demand for a left-wing political organisation in 1954 by linking with a group led by Harry McShane (from Glasgow) and the Militant Socialist Group from London to establish the 'Federation of Marxist Groups' (later renamed the 'Socialist Workers Federation') which had a policy of syndicalism. This group was a compromise: while it insisted that it itself was not a revolutionary political party, it simultaneously said that there was a need for such a party, and actively rejected the Labour Party. However, Heffer had decided by 1956 to rejoin the Labour Party.

=== Liverpool ===
His activities led to Heffer's becoming known throughout Liverpool where he served on the Executive of the Trades Council; he was its Vice President in 1958, President in 1959 and again in 1964. The Trades Council was a local association of trade unions, and as such Heffer helped mediate and end an unofficial strike of seamen in 1960. He was also elected as a Liverpool City Councillor for Pirrie ward that year. In 1962 he made a run for the job of General Secretary of the Amalgamated Society of Woodworkers, but was defeated. Heffer made a contribution to a book, The Agreeable Autocracies, which was published in 1961. The book was a discussion of United States institutions.

== Parliament ==
In 1963 Heffer was unexpectedly selected to fight the Liverpool Walton constituency for the Labour Party. The previously Conservative-held constituency went to Heffer on a large swing in the 1964 general election, as did a number of other Liverpool seats. There was never any doubt that Heffer would ally with the left in the Parliamentary Labour Party, and he campaigned in 1965 for early moves to nationalise the docks, where he knew from his experience on Liverpool Trades Council that dockers were employed on highly disadvantageous terms that effectively prevented trade unions forming. Also in 1965 Heffer protested outside the United States embassy against the use of napalm and gas in the Vietnam War, and in Parliament against the diplomatic support given by the government. By 1970 he was rated as one of the most effective of the large 1964 intake of Labour MPs: in David Butler's The British General Election of 1970 (page 4), he was identified as a leading figure in the Tribune Group, which had been established in 1964.

Doris Heffer served jointly as her husband's secretary, and secretary to fellow Labour MP Norman Buchan. She often accompanied him to speaking engagements where they made an odd couple: Heffer was both tall and heavily built, while his wife was only 4'6" tall. Heffer made a good-humoured complaint when political journalist Andrew Roth described Doris as "tiny", insisting that she was actually "petite". According to the diaries of Giles Radice, Doris Heffer would sit in the front row of the audience when Heffer was speaking, saying, "Nonsense, Eric" if he said something with which she disagreed. The Heffers had no children.

=== Wilson's government ===
After winning re-election with a 5,000 majority in the 1966 general election, Heffer began to make his mark on economic policy. With deflation proposed in the July 1966 economic crisis, he pressed for cuts in defence spending, and opposed the 'wage freeze' proposed in the government's Prices and Incomes Bill—rebelling against it in the House of Commons on several occasions in 1967. Heffer regarded unemployment as the worst catastrophe in running the economy and often demanded nationalisation of firms which threatened mass redundancies. Government policy was significantly different, placing more emphasis on maintaining the value of the pound. In August 1967, Wilson, who recognised his abilities, asked Heffer to take a junior post at the Ministry of Technology under Tony Benn. Heffer refused, citing his opposition to government economic policy, and demanded the resignation of James Callaghan as Chancellor of the Exchequer.

At this time, Heffer was a strong proponent of British membership of the European Economic Community. He headed a study group established by the Society for Parliamentary Studies (a group for left-wing Labour MPs) to look into British relations with Europe, and demanded the resignation of Minister of Agriculture, Fisheries and Food Fred Peart when Peart expressed doubts about the merits of the Common Agriculture Policy. At the 1967 Labour Party conference, Heffer argued for Britain in Europe to build up a third force in the world which would stand up to the US and the Soviet Union. He also began a campaign to win a place on the National Executive Committee at this conference, standing again each year and steadily building his support. Another preoccupation which began at this time was the Waterloo Cup, a hare coursing event at Great Altcar near his constituency: he promoted an unsuccessful private member's bill to ban hare coursing, returning to the subject at intervals over the next decade.

In February 1968 Heffer was one of the Labour MPs to rebel against the government's decision to withdraw British passports from the Kenyan Asians who were arriving at Heathrow Airport in increasing numbers, fleeing persecution in Kenya. He maintained pressure on the government over the Vietnam war and criticised the Greek military dictatorship of 'the Colonels' for "bestial and barbarous practices". On two of the issues which divided the Labour Party at the time, Heffer took the side of the rebels: he rejected the proposals for reform of the House of Lords as too weak, preferring fundamental reform or preferably abolition, and he worked to change proposals in Barbara Castle's trade union white paper In Place of Strife (a cabinet rebellion later forced the government to abandon it completely).

=== Opposing Heath ===
As a strong opponent of the government's economic policy, Heffer was invited to submit an article to a Guardian book endorsing the re-election of a Labour government in the 1970 general election as a counter to an article by a Labour loyalist. Perhaps as a consequence of his identification with the left, Heffer had only a small swing against him in the election. Following a narrow defeat in the elections for the shadow cabinet, he accepted a front bench job as deputy to Barbara Castle as Shadow Minister of Employment. As such he was closely involved in the protests over the Heath government's Industrial Relations Act, which attempted to restrict the powers of trade unions.

Heffer's vote in shadow cabinet elections rose in 1971 when he tied with Castle in 15th place. While Heffer could work with Barbara Castle, she was moved in a reshuffle in 1972 and replaced by Reg Prentice who was already beginning the move across the political spectrum which would see him join the Conservative Party in 1977. Prentice's refusal to pledge support to five dockers imprisoned under the Industrial Relations Act appalled Heffer who considered resignation. When in February 1973 it became clear that Prentice had more leadership support, Heffer resigned (refusing an offer of another post). He remained interested in the topic and promoted a private member's bill to abolish the 'Lump' (sub-contracting of labour in the building industry).

Heffer had revised his opinions on the EEC in 1970, deciding that the spending on the Common Agriculture Policy was excessive and too big a burden on the budget. He voted with the majority of the Labour Party against endorsing the Heath government's application in October 1971.

== Ministerial office ==
In March 1974, Harold Wilson invited Heffer to be Minister of State at the Department of Industry under Tony Benn. Heffer accepted the offer, while remaining concerned that he would be cocooned in his office and lose his links with the wider Labour movement outside. He had some difficulties coping with the concept of 'collective responsibility' – denouncing the government's decision to continue a contract to build warships with the right-wing government of Chile on 10 April. Wilson, reluctant to cause trouble with the left-wing, decided not to sack him on the grounds that he was inexperienced. Heffer received many minutes from Wilson asking him to follow government policy in speeches, such that he minuted Wilson to tell him not to send them.

Heffer worked together with Benn to try to establish the National Enterprise Board, which would provide industry with investment funding and have the ability to take failing firms into public ownership. On 15 August 1974 the plans were unveiled in a White paper and preparations began for the Industry Bill which would enact it. While this policy had been agreed by Wilson in opposition and then appeared in the Labour manifesto, in government he began to think more critically. Drafting of the Bill was delayed over the winter and it was not introduced until January 1975.

In the meantime, the government prepared for the referendum on the European Communities through which Wilson hoped to settle the differences over the issue in the country and the party. The Cabinet decided on 18 March to endorse a vote to stay in the EEC, but Wilson decided to allow individual Ministers to make speeches against membership in the country. Ministers were not, however, allowed to speak against the decision in the House of Commons. Heffer was angry at this rule and wanted to resign. Eventually, he engineered a dismissal on a question of principle by making a speech against EEC membership in the House of Commons on 9 April. During the referendum, Heffer was one of the best speakers for the No campaign, although he had a tendency to speculate about the issue – claiming that the EEC would reintroduce conscription.

== Backbench rebel ==
Following the referendum, Tony Benn was demoted from the Department for Industry and the Industry Bill was again made weaker. As a backbencher Heffer campaigned against the change and for more investment in industry. At the 1975 Labour conference his bid for a National Executive Committee (NEC) seat was finally successful as he defeated Denis Healey. Heffer again became known as one of the leading left-wing Labour backbenchers who frequently voted against the government. He opposed the government's incomes policy (which had been agreed as a voluntary arrangement with the Trades Union Congress), and abstained rather than support the government's white paper on public expenditure in March 1976 which helped ensure the government's defeat.

Despite Heffer's friendship with Tony Benn, he voted for Michael Foot in the Labour leadership election of 1976. However he did support Benn's 'Alternative Economic Strategy' which called for government assistance to industry, import restrictions, surcharges on high net income and capital and controls on banks.

Heffer was opposed to the government's proposals for devolution to Scotland and Wales. He abstained in the vote on a guillotine motion on the Scotland and Wales Bill on 22 February 1977, which resulted in the defeat of the guillotine, the loss of the Bill and endangered the government. A pact was negotiated between the Labour Party and the Liberals to ensure a majority. Heffer was upset about the pact and started a motion to call a special meeting of the National Executive Committee (the Prime Minister, James Callaghan, forbade Ministers to sign it).

=== NEC member ===
Increasingly Heffer began to use his position on the Labour Party NEC as the base of his political action. He began a specific campaign to nationalise the building construction industry in the National Construction Corporation, and raised the issue at the 1977 Labour Party conference and on the TUC-Labour Party Liaison Committee, where Callaghan vetoed any consideration of the idea by government. In intra-party matters, Heffer opposed taking action against the Militant tendency after a report by the party's national agent Reg Underhill raised concerns over its activities. Heffer's constituency of Walton was one of the strongest areas of Militant but Heffer believed that Trotskyists within the Labour Party could be countered by political arguments. He recommended that local parties hold political education events to explain democratic socialism to the Militant-dominated Labour Party Young Socialists.

In the late 1970s Heffer fought to change government policy to try to reduce unemployment, and he opposed the continuation of a pay policy which caused the strikes of the Winter of Discontent. He was one of the left-wing members of an ad hoc sub-committee of the NEC which undertook the task of cutting an overlong manifesto for the 1979 general election down to a manageable size. Heffer was one of those who wanted abolition of the House of Lords in the manifesto, a policy vetoed by James Callaghan.

After Labour lost the election, Heffer ran for the shadow cabinet again and finished as the runner-up. He joined the campaign of the left to change the democratic structure of the Labour Party to give more power to those bodies such as party conference where the left was strong. He was an important link between the National Executive and the Parliamentary Labour Party. Heffer did endorse the policy of forcing Labour Members of Parliament to seek reselection from their constituency parties, although he wanted the vote to involve all members rather than the 'General Management Committee' which comprised only activists.

=== Would-be leadership candidate ===
The most important issue for the left in the early 1980s was to change the system of election of the Leader of the Labour Party, which had until then been chosen solely by Labour MPs. The left wanted to have the Leader elected by an 'electoral college' which would include affiliated trade unions and individual Constituency Labour Parties. At the 1980 Labour Party conference a procedural motion to allow the change to be made without delay was narrowly carried after Heffer argued for it, but all proposals for balancing the composition of the electoral college were defeated and the issue was deferred until a special conference.

With an electoral college Leadership system in prospect, James Callaghan resigned as Leader in October 1980 to make sure that his successor was elected under the old system. Heffer regarded such an election as illegitimate and moved to suspend it until the new system was agreed, but the Parliamentary Labour Party rejected it. He considered standing as a candidate himself but eventually deferred to Michael Foot who was eventually elected (against expectations). Due to a resignation, Heffer was briefly promoted to be a member of the shadow cabinet in October–November 1980. Foot made Heffer spokesman on Europe and Community Affairs from November.

== Militant ==
Concern about the Militant tendency led Reg Underhill, whose 1975 report had been dismissed by Heffer, to issue a revised version in 1980. This report made it clear that most party institutions in Liverpool, especially in Heffer's constituency, were now under Militant control. Heffer compared the report to the propaganda of Joseph Goebbels, but he knew that Militant was powerful: when Heffer considered running against Denis Healey for the Deputy Leadership of the Labour Party under the new electoral college system in 1981, his constituency party prevented him. He supported Benn when Benn challenged Healey.

Heffer was elected to the shadow cabinet in 1981. While he was a strong supporter of the left, Heffer accepted the need to preserve party unity. In December 1981 he attempted to solve the problem of Michael Foot's denunciation of Peter Tatchell (who had been selected as Labour candidate for Bermondsey) by holding a quick enquiry, but this attempt failed when Foot loyalists passed a motion to refuse Tatchell endorsement. Heffer's attempts to mediate between the Bermondsey Party and Foot were regarded as 'paternalist' by Tatchell and his local supporters. Heffer also joined with Foot and Denis Healey in an NEC motion calling for negotiations with the United Nations Secretary-General following the Argentine invasion of the Falkland Islands on 28 April 1982, in opposition to a motion from Tony Benn calling for a ceasefire and withdrawal of the British taskforce.

In June 1982 the NEC discussed Militant again, with Heffer proposing that all members of the Labour Party subscribe to a 'statement of democratic socialist principles' which was defeated by 22 votes to 5. At the 1982 Labour Party conference the right-wing won back control of the NEC, and at its first meeting the left-wing were voted out of all their chairmanships in a coup organised by John Golding. This included Heffer, who had been chairman of the powerful 'Organisation Sub-Committee' (usually known as Org Sub). The change allowed the right to begin to take action against Militant, membership of which was declared incompatible with party membership. The five members of Militant's editorial board were expelled in February 1983 despite Heffer's motion to have a further investigation.

=== Candidate for leader ===
The 1983 election was a disaster for Labour which lost a substantial number of votes. Michael Foot resigned the leadership immediately afterwards, and with Tony Benn ineligible because of his own defeat, Heffer stood for the leadership as the candidate of the 'hard left' in the election. He received minimal support among the trade unions and constituency parties, and came third among Labour MPs, obtaining in all 6.3% of the electoral college. Neil Kinnock appointed him as Shadow Minister for the Construction Industry, noting his long experience in the area. Heffer was also Chairman of the Labour Party from the end of the 1983 conference, a position which conveyed no authority but recognised his seniority.

However, with a Militant-dominated Labour council in Liverpool having been elected in 1983, Heffer found increasing trouble in his constituency. The Liverpool Labour Party adopted Militant's policy of a 'deficit budget'. This included no cuts to jobs and services, and no rent and rates increases higher than inflation, and a promise to increase services and confront central government with the £270 million stolen, it claimed, in grants from the city since the Conservatives came to power in 1979. It was voted into office by a landslide. The administration produced a financial crisis, since the budget, set in April by the outgoing Tory-Liberal coalition, included unallocated cuts of £6 million, including 1000 job losses, which the administration cancelled, and an extra 1000 jobs had been promised instead. When the council met on 29 March 1984 it was told clearly that the Militant proposed 'deficit budget' contained an illegal £30 million deficit, but no alternative could get a majority and it went through. All but seven Labour councillors stood by the budget, and Heffer supported the council in its demands of government and after a series of meetings with the Secretary of State for the Environment Patrick Jenkin, the government eventually gave way and allowed practically all of the budget.

In November 1984 Heffer did not win re-election to the shadow cabinet and left the Labour front bench. He said that he took a principled stance not to take any front bench post unless elected to it.

=== Kinnock takes action ===
Liverpool's financial confrontation continued in 1985 when it eventually set another 'deficit budget'. This time the government would not help, and Militant's attempt to get the council's workforce to strike against the Thatcher government was narrowly defeated in a ballot. By September the council was almost out of cash and applied to the new Environment Secretary (Kenneth Baker) for a loan of £25 million. In a desperate attempt to avoid bankruptcy, on 27 September the council issued 90-day redundancy notices to its entire workforce, using a fleet of taxis to deliver them.

On 1 October Neil Kinnock spoke at the Labour Party conference and denounced (without identifying Liverpool) the actions of the council. Heffer was appalled at Kinnock's actions and walked off the platform in protest. This action was capable of misinterpretation: Heffer was fully supportive of the council's actions, but not a Militant member, and felt that Kinnock was insulting the whole City, and also that he as the senior Liverpool MP ought to have been told in advance. Heffer's autobiography has been taken by most reviewers to illustrate his "known dislike" for Kinnock. One sixth of the book is devoted to expressing his views that Kinnock's "betrayal of socialism" led to "a rigid party discipline and the expulsion of Militant supporters".

Heffer's views are most clearly expressed in a letter he sent to Labour Party general secretary Larry Whitty at the time of the 1986 inquiry into the Liverpool District Labour Party:

What concerns me is the serious effect all this is having on the future electoral fortunes of this party. A witch-hunt against Liverpool party members and some MPs will not satisfy the right-wing press. Today's Daily Telegraph leaders make it absolutely clear. What can happen is a civil war within the party, and if that occurs, we shall be handing electoral success to the SDP-Liberal Alliance, not to Labour ... I therefore appeal to you as General Secretary to do all you can to steer the party away from this self-destructive course.

On 27 March 1986 the leading members of the Liverpool Labour Party were brought before the National Executive where their expulsion was being proposed. Heffer had accompanied Derek Hatton during his NEC hearing regarding the Liverpool District Labour Party. He joined a walk-out by members of the left which rendered the meeting inquorate. At later meetings he voted against expelling Militant members. His refusal to support those taking action against Militant led to Heffer losing his position on the Labour Party National Executive at the 1986 conference, a loss which Heffer took personally, and indicated the changed nature of the Labour Party, which Heffer anticipated in his letter to Whitty in 1986. The 47 Labour councillors who stood behind the deficit budget strategy were removed from office in 1987 and surcharged £106,000, with costs of £242,000, which they raised through donations from the trade unions and Labour Party members.

== Last years ==
Heffer's constituency had become increasingly safe for him over the years and at the 1987 election he had the largest absolute Labour vote in the country and a rock-solid 23,000 majority. Neil Kinnock's decision to review the policy of the Labour Party after the election, which was a clear prelude to dropping some of the more left-wing policies, led him to urge the left in the Socialist Campaign Group to fight the Leadership and Deputy Leadership in 1988. Tony Benn was chosen to challenge Kinnock as Leader, while Heffer and John Prescott (from the Tribune group) opposed Roy Hattersley for the Deputy Leadership. Neither had any realistic hope of winning, and Heffer eventually won only 9.483% of the vote.

On 24 November 1989 Heffer announced that he would not fight the next election. The decision was prompted by the fact that he had been diagnosed with terminal stomach cancer. He suffered a long decline during which he devoted himself to writing. When Parliament was recalled to debate the invasion of Kuwait in September 1990, Heffer made what he knew would be his last speech in the House of Commons to urge the United Kingdom not to go to war. His gaunt and white appearance showed how ill he was. In January 1991 he attended the House of Commons to vote against the Gulf War in a wheelchair, when John Major crossed the floor to shake his hand. On 27 March 1991 he was awarded the freedom of the city of Liverpool, but as he was too ill to travel there, he received it at Westminster. His close friend Tony Benn attended the ceremony along with Dennis Skinner and speaker Bernard Weatherill. A letter was read out paying tribute to Heffer from John Major.

Two months later, on 27 May, Heffer died at his home in London, aged 69. Although he clashed on several occasions with Margaret Thatcher, they mutually respected each other personally, and she wrote a letter of condolence to Heffer's widow when he died. She also attended his memorial service held on 10 July 1991. Other notable names who attended included Neil Hamilton, Jonathan Aitken, Geoffrey Howe, James Molyneaux, Ian Paisley, Alan Beith, John Biffen, Patrick Mayhew, John Smith and Tony Benn, who paid a personal tribute.

== Publications ==
Heffer was a bibliophile whose collection of 12,000 books was much more than his small house would normally accommodate. He also wrote prodigiously. His publications include:

- The Class Struggle in Parliament: A Socialist View of Industrial Relations (Gollancz, 1973, ISBN 978-0-575-01640-8): An analysis of the way trade union issues are handled by Parliament.
- Towards Democratic Socialism (Institute for Workers Control, 1981): a policy pamphlet.
- Labour's Future – Socialist or SDP Mark 2? (Verso, 1986, ISBN 978-0-86091-876-9): Heffer's concern over Neil Kinnock's reforms showed in this early book. The terms in which Heffer posed the question in its title clearly indicated his preference for the former option.
- Faith in Politics: Which Way Should Christians Vote? (Society for Promoting Christian Knowledge, 1987, ISBN 978-0-281-04299-9): Heffer contributed a Labour essay to go with contributions from John Gummer for the Conservatives and Alan Beith for the SDP-Liberal Alliance.
- Why I Am a Christian (Spire, 1991, ISBN 978-0-340-55873-7)
- Never a Yes Man: The Life and Politics of an Adopted Liverpudlian (Verso Books, 1991, ISBN 978-0-86091-350-4): his posthumously published autobiography.

== Legacy ==
In 2019, Liverpool Walton Constituency Labour Party launched the annual Eric Heffer Memorial Lecture to pay tribute to Heffer's legacy and explore how his ideas of internationalist, democratic socialism can be applied today. The first lecture, delivered by Heffer's successor as Liverpool Walton MP, Dan Carden, was published in Tribune.

== Positions held ==
Parliament of the United Kingdom
Preceded by Sir Kenneth Thompson	Member of Parliament for Liverpool Walton; 1964–1991	Succeeded by Peter Kilfoyle
Political offices
Preceded by Sam McCluskie	Chair of the Labour Party; 1983–1984	Succeeded by Alan Hadden
