= Coventry City Council elections =

Local government elections in Coventry, England

Coventry City Council elections are generally held three years out of every four, with a third of the council being elected each time. Coventry City Council is the local authority for the metropolitan borough of Coventry in the West Midlands, England. Since the last boundary changes in 2004, 54 councillors have been elected from 18 wards.

== Election results ==
Composition of the council
Year	Labour	Conservative	Socialist Party	Reform	Liberal Democrats (Note: Includes totals for the predecessors of the Liberal Democrats, the Liberal Party and SDP (both of which participated in the Alliance).)	Green (Note: Includes totals for the predecessors of the Green Party of England and Wales, the Ecology Party and Green Party UK.)	Independents & Others	Council control after election
Local government reorganisation; council established (54 seats)
1973	42	12	–	–	0	–	0	Labour
1975	33	21	–	–	0	0	0	Labour
1976	28	26	–	–	0	0	0	Labour
1978	25	29	–	–	0	0	0	Conservative
1979	31	23	–	–	0	0	0	Labour
New ward boundaries (54 seats)
1980	39	15	–	–	0	0	0	Labour
1982	35	19	–	–	0	0	0	Labour
1983	33	21	–	–	0	0	0	Labour
1984	34	20	–	–	0	0	0	Labour
1986	40	13	–	–	1	0	0	Labour
1987	41	11	–	–	2	0	0	Labour
1988	43	10	–	–	1	0	0	Labour
1990	44	9	–	–	1	0	0	Labour
1991	46	8	–	–	0	0	0	Labour
1992	42	12	–	–	0	0	0	Labour
1994	41	13	–	–	0	0	0	Labour
1995	43	11	–	–	0	0	0	Labour
1996	49	4	–	–	0	0	1	Labour
1998	45	7	0	–	0	0	2 (Note: 1 Independent, 1 Socialist Labour)	Labour
1999	44	8	2	–	0	0	0	Labour
2000	35	15	3	–	0	1	0	Labour
2002	35	15	3	–	1	0	0	Labour
2003	26	23	3	–	2	0	0	No overall control
New ward boundaries (54 seats)
2004	22	27	2	–	3	0	0	No overall control
2006	19	29	3	–	2	0	1	Conservative
2007	23	28	2	–	1	0	0	Conservative
2008	24	27	2	–	1	0	0	No overall control
2010	30	22	1	–	1	0	0	Labour
2011	35	17	1	–	1	0	0	Labour
2012	43	11	0	–	0	0	0	Labour
2014	43	11	0	–	0	0	0	Labour
2015	42	12	0	–	0	0	0	Labour
2016	39	15	0	–	0	0	0	Labour
2018	40	14	0	–	0	0	0	Labour
2019	40	13	0	–	0	0	1	Labour
2021	39	15	0	0	0	0	0	Labour
2022	39	14	0	0	0	1	0	Labour
2023	37	15	0	0	0	2	0	Labour
2024	40	12	0	0	0	2	0	Labour
New ward boundaries (54 seats)
2026	24	6	0	20	0	4	0	No overall control

== Borough result maps ==
2004 results map

2006 results map

2007 results map

2008 results map

2010 results map

2011 results map

2012 results map

2014 results map

2015 results map

2016 results map

2018 results map

2019 results map

2021 results map

2022 results map

2023 results map

2024 results map

2026 results map

== By-election results ==
=== 1994–1998 ===
Foleshill By-Election 6 June 1996
Party	Candidate	Votes	%	±%
Labour		1,674	49.0	
Conservative		953	27.9	
Militant Labour		535	15.6	
Liberal Democrats		255	7.5	
Majority		721	21.1	
Turnout		3,417	28.9	
Labour hold		Swing		

Henley By-Election 1 May 1997
Party	Candidate	Votes	%	±%
Labour		4,801	63.7	−7.2
Conservative		1,600	21.2	+2.4
Liberal Democrats		1,136	15.1	+4.8
Majority		3,201	42.5	
Turnout		7,537	62.0	
Labour hold		Swing		

Wainbody By-Election 13 November 1997
Party	Candidate	Votes	%	±%
Conservative		1,741	61.8	+11.9
Labour		673	23.9	−7.8
Liberal Democrats		360	12.8	−5.6
Socialist Alliance		44	1.6	+1.6
Majority		1,068	37.9	
Turnout		2,818	22.2	
Conservative hold		Swing		

Cheylesmore By-Election 7 June 2001
Party	Candidate	Votes	%	±%
Labour		2,998	46.9	−5.2
Conservative		2,146	33.6	−23.2
Liberal Democrats		987	15.5	+13.9
Unknown		257	4.0	+4.0
Majority		852	13.3	
Turnout		6,388		
Labour hold		Swing		

Radford By-Election 20 September 2001
Party	Candidate	Votes	%	±%
Labour	Tony Skipper	873	53.5	+2.2
Liberal Democrats	Peter Simpson	442	27.1	+11.8
Conservative	Gary Ridley	316	19.4	−8.4
Majority		431	26.4	
Turnout		1,631	13.0	
Labour hold		Swing		

=== 2006–2010 ===
Lower Stoke By-Election 6 October 2011
Party	Candidate	Votes	%	±%
Labour	Catherine Elizabeth Miks	1,366	53.9	−3.3
Conservative	Jaswant Singh Birdi	563	22.2	−0.1
Socialist	Robert McArdle	254	10.0	+3.6
BNP	Keith Oxford	149	5.9	+0.2
Green	Laura Vesty	114	4.5	−3.2
Liberal Democrats	Mark Edward Widdop	79	3.1	N/A
Majority		803	31.7	
Turnout		2,532	18.51	
Labour hold		Swing		

=== 2014–2018 ===
Lower Stoke By-Election 11 February 2016
Party	Candidate	Votes	%	±%
Labour	Rupinder Singh	1,237		
Conservative	Ellane Francoise Yebkal	344		
UKIP	Harjinder Singh Sehmi	290		
Green	Aimee Challenor	165		
Liberal Democrats	Christopher Mark Glenn	124		
Majority		893		
Turnout		2,160		
Labour hold		Swing		

=== 2018–2022 ===
Wainbody By-Election 5 September 2019
Party	Candidate	Votes	%	±%
Conservative	Mattie Heaven	1,560	53	
Liberal Democrats	James Frederick Morshead	634	22	
Labour	Abdul Jobbar	544	19	
Brexit Party	George Stuart Ronald Beamish	193	7	
Majority		926		
Turnout		2,948		
Conservative hold		Swing		

Upper Stoke By-Election 19 March 2020
Party	Candidate	Votes	%	±%
Labour	Gurdev Singh Hayre	639	53	
Conservative	Gurdeep Singh Sohal	350	29	
Green	Chrissie Lynn Brown	120	10	
Socialist Alternative	Jane Elizabeth Nellist	101	8	
Majority		289		
Turnout		1,210		
Labour hold		Swing		

=== 2022–2026 ===
Binley and Willenhall By-Election 14 July 2022
Party	Candidate	Votes	%	±%
Labour	Seyi Agboola	934	36.2	−5.1
Conservative	Amarjit Singh Khangura	765	29.6	+0.7
Coventry Citizens	Paul Cowley	746	28.9	+9.6
ADF	Marianne Fitzgerald	91	3.5	+0.1
TUSC	Michael Morgan	46	1.8	+1.8
Majority		169	6.5	
Turnout		2,582		
Labour hold		Swing		

Sherbourne By-Election 22 September 2022
Party	Candidate	Votes	%	±%
Conservative	Jackie Gardiner	1,409	51.2	+12.3
Labour	Des Arthur	895	32.5	−7.4
Green	Bruce Tetlow	139	5.0	−4.2
TUSC	Jane Nellist	125	4.5	+0.1
Liberal Democrats	Jamie Simpson	94	3.4	−1.4
Coventry Citizens	Cameron Baxter	92	3.3	+0.6
Majority		514	18.7	
Turnout		2,754		
Conservative gain from Labour		Swing		

Earlsdon By-Election 26 October 2023
Party	Candidate	Votes	%	±%
Labour	Lynette Kelly	1,388	43.0	–9.3
Conservative	Zaid Rehman	1,017	31.5	+2.3
Liberal Democrats	Stephen Richmond	489	15.1	+7.8
Green	John Finlayson	193	6.0	–1.0
Coventry Citizens	Cameron Baxter	107	3.3	+0.4
TUSC	Adam Harmsworth	37	1.1	–0.2
Majority		371	11.5	
Turnout		3,241		
Labour hold		Swing		

St Michael's By-Election 10 October 2024
Party	Candidate	Votes	%	±%
Labour	Sanjida Jobbar	899	49.1	–13.0
TUSC	Dave Nellist	327	17.9	+8.7
Workers Party	Ejaz Januja	212	11.6	+11.6
Conservative	Mehmet Yetkin	145	7.9	–1.9
Green	Thomas Jewell	96	5.2	–4.0
Coventry Citizens	Karen Wilson	94	5.1	–0.1
Liberal Democrats	Robyn Simpson	57	3.1	–1.0
Majority		572	31.3	
Turnout		1,830		
Labour hold		Swing		
