= Dave Nellist =

British Trotskyist politician (born 1952)

Leader of the Trade Unionist and Socialist Coalition
- Incumbent
- Assumed office 2010
- Preceded by: Party founded

Coventry City Councillor for St Michaels ward
- In office 7 May 1998 – 3 May 2012 Serving with Karen McKay (Socialist Alternative); Rob Windsor (Socialist Alternative); Jim O'Boyle (Labour); David Welsh (Labour)

Member of Parliament for Coventry South East
- In office 9 June 1983 – 16 March 1992
- Preceded by: William Wilson
- Succeeded by: Jim Cunningham

Personal details
- Born: 16 July 1952 (age 74) North Yorkshire, England
- Party: Socialist Party (1997–present)
- Other political affiliations: TUSC (2009–present); Labour (until 1991)
- Spouse: Jane Warner (m. 1984)
- Children: Joe Nellist; Bethan Clarke; Charlotte Nellist; Clara Nellist

David John Nellist (born 16 July 1952) is a British Trotskyist activist who was the MP for the constituency of Coventry South East from 1983 to 1992. Elected as a Labour MP, his support for the Militant tendency led to his eventual expulsion from the party in late 1991. He is the National Chair of the Trade Unionist and Socialist Coalition (TUSC), a member of the Socialist Party, and was a city councillor in Coventry from 1998 to 2012.

== Political career ==
=== Member of Parliament ===
A long-standing supporter of the Militant tendency, Nellist was the MP for Coventry South East from 1983 to 1992. He was known for his standing as a "workers' MP on a worker's wage", taking only the wage of a skilled factory worker, which amounted to 46% of what was then an MP's salary. The remaining 54% he donated to the Labour movement and to charities. From 1982 to 1986, Nellist was also a Labour councillor for Coventry on West Midlands County Council.

When Tony Blair was first elected to Parliament in 1983, he initially shared an office with Nellist at the Palace of Westminster. The duo's differing political views were considered not to make for the most harmonious working environment, so Blair was quickly allocated office space with Gordon Brown, another newly elected Labour MP, and Nellist subsequently shared the office with the other Militant supporting MP, Terry Fields.

In late 1991, shortly before his expulsion from the Labour Party, he was awarded the "Backbencher of the Year" award by the conservative Spectator magazine. Michael White of The Guardian recalled in 2007 the speech Nellist gave after receiving the award: "It was witty and highly political, done with style and without compromise. They cheered him fervently and then returned to their brandy. But it was one of the best speeches I have ever heard."

=== Expulsion ===
Nellist in 1991 was one of the two MPs who were supporters of Militant, which had been found to contravene the Labour Party constitution several years earlier. Following a National Executive Committee meeting in December 1991, along with Terry Fields he was expelled from the Labour Party and deselected as a candidate for the 1992 general election.

Nellist gained the support of his Constituency party (which was subsequently suspended by the National Executive Committee) and a number of local trade unions. Standing as an Independent Labour candidate in the elections, he came third in his old seat to the newly selected Labour Party candidate Jim Cunningham. Cunningham received 11,902 votes, Conservative Party candidate Martine Hyams 10,591, and Dave Nellist 10,551, or 28.9% of the vote.

=== Socialist Party and Socialist Alliance ===
Nellist followed the majority of Militant in founding what became the Socialist Party (not to be confused with the Socialist Party of Great Britain). Due to registration requirements, the party uses the name "Socialist Alternative" on ballot papers. Instead of running candidates independently, however, the party has played a leading role in several political coalitions, including the Socialist Alliance.

Nellist was a prominent figure in organising the Socialist Alliance, locally and across the UK, as a loose formation of individuals and groups. He became the Chair of the Socialist Alliance, but resigned in 2001, in protest of what the Socialist Party saw as manoeuvrings of the Socialist Workers Party to take control of the Alliance. He is involved in the Campaign for a New Workers' Party in Britain, which is a Socialist Party sponsored campaign to create a new party to represent the working class in the UK.

Nellist ran in every general election since his deselection by the Labour Party until 2015. In 1997, he ran in the Coventry South constituency, and received 3,262 votes (6.5%). In 2001 and 2005, he ran in the Coventry North East constituency. In 2001, he received 2,638 votes (7.1%). In 2005, he received 1,874 votes (5.0%).

=== City councillor in Coventry ===
In 1998, Nellist was elected as a city councillor in the Coventry City Council for St. Michael's ward, where he was reelected in 2004 and again in 2008, with an increased majority, when he received 48.6% of the vote. By 2006, when Rob Windsor was elected, the Socialist Party had won all three of St. Michael's seats. However, Nellist's Socialist colleagues were defeated in the local elections of 2007 and 2010, respectively, and in the 2012 local elections, Nellist lost his seat in the St. Michael's ward to the Labour Party candidate Naeem Akhtar by 213 votes.

=== No to EU – Yes to Democracy ===
Nellist stood as a No to EU – Yes to Democracy candidate in the 2009 European election in the West Midlands Region of England gaining 13,415 votes (0.9%). No2EU takes a socialist, trade union and alter-globalisation Eurosceptic stance from a workers' perspective.

=== Trade Unionist and Socialist Coalition (TUSC) ===
Following the 2009 European elections, Nellist played a leading role in the formation of the Trade Unionist and Socialist Coalition (TUSC), of which he is interim leader. The coalition is composed of the National Union of Rail, Maritime and Transport Workers, Socialist Party, Socialist Resistance, the Socialist Workers Party and Solidarity; and is endorsed by Steve Gillan, General Secretary of the Prison Officers' Association and Chris Baugh, Assistant General Secretary of Public and Commercial Services Union. Considering the overlap in constituent parties, TUSC is seen as a successor to the Socialist Alliance and the No to EU – Yes to Democracy alliance.

Nellist stood as a candidate for TUSC in the 2010 general elections in the constituency Coventry North East, although he stood under the label Socialist Alternative. Running against the incumbent MP, the Labour government's Secretary of State for Defence Bob Ainsworth, he received 1,592 votes (3.7%) losing his deposit for the first time in a Westminster constituency.

The TUSC nominated Nellist to contest the 2022 Birmingham Erdington by-election, where he came third. The constituency's previous MP, Jack Dromey, died earlier on 7 January.

=== Endorsement of Jeremy Corbyn ===
In August 2015, Nellist endorsed Jeremy Corbyn's campaign in the Labour Party leadership election. He said: "I hope Jeremy does well in the election and, if successful, his first action should be to instruct local Labour councils to halt cuts and direct a strategy to resist austerity." Nellist also hinted he could seek to merge his new party with the Labour Party.

In August 2016, Nellist also endorsed Corbyn's campaign in the Labour Party leadership election. He responded to the letter backing Owen Smith's leadership challenge from over 500 Labour councillors by saying: "If Jeremy is re-elected he must use his renewed mandate to compel Labour councillors to either fight the Tories or stand aside for those who will – and TUSC will back him all the way." In November 2016, he was among 75 people expelled from the Labour Party who wrote to the party's National Executive Committee asking to be re-admitted. However, he is not eligible to rejoin while being affiliated to another political party.

In May 2017, he withdrew as a candidate for the general election and encouraged supporters in Coventry to back Corbyn for Prime Minister. He said: "I support Jeremy's anti-austerity policies of higher wages, free university education, crash housebuilding programme, public ownership of the railways – and four more bank holidays! I want to see him elected Prime Minister on June 8th ... we have a chance on June 8th to send Jeremy to No. 10 and we can't do that if Coventry sends Tory MPs to Westminster."

=== Your Party ===
in January 2026 Nellist and April Ashley put themselves forward for election to the regional seats in Your Party. However the returning officer told them that, along with several others, they have been judged ineligible to stand. Your Party co-founder Zarah Sultana described this as a 'witch hunt'.

== Personal life ==
In August 1984, Nellist married Jane (née Warner) in North Yorkshire. In 2014, she was elected as a member of the National Executive Committee of the National Union of Teachers. They have two daughters (born 1985 and 1987) and one son (born 1989). Nellist also has a daughter born 1982.

From 1992 to 1997, he worked on welfare rights cases for Robert Zara Ltd, solicitors in Coventry. From 1997 to 2017, he worked for Coventry Citizens Advice Bureau, from 1997 to 2012 as a case worker, from 2012 to 2017 as IT manager.

== Elections contested ==
UK Parliament elections

Date of election	Constituency	Party	Votes	%	Results
1983	Coventry South East	Labour	15,307	41.09	Elected
1987	Coventry South East	Labour	17,969	47.46	Elected
1992	Coventry South East	Independent Labour	10,551	28.88	Not elected
1997	Coventry South	Socialist Party^{1}	3,262	6.5	Not elected
2001	Coventry North East	Socialist Party^{1}	2,638	7.1	Not elected
2005	Coventry North East	Socialist Party^{1}	1,874	5.04	Not elected
2010	Coventry North East	TUSC	1,592	3.7	Not elected
2015	Coventry North West	TUSC	1,769	3.9	Not elected
2022	Birmingham Erdington	TUSC	360	2.1	Not elected
2024	Coventry East	TUSC	797	2.2	Not elected

UK local elections

Date of election	Ward	Party	Votes	%	Results
1978	Earlsdon	Labour	1,265	19.0	Not elected
1995	Coventry St. Michael's	Militant Labour	1,357	40.1	Not elected
1996	Coventry St. Michael's	Militant Labour	1,420	41.3	Not elected
1998	Coventry St. Michael's	Socialist Party^{1}	1,766	52.7	Elected
2002	Coventry St. Michael's	Socialist Party^{1}	1,417	53.0	Elected
2004	Coventry St. Michael's	Socialist Party^{1}	1,586	43.1	Elected
2008	Coventry St. Michael's	Socialist Party^{1}	1,643	48.6	Elected
2012	Coventry St. Michael's	Socialist Party^{1}	1,469	43.4	Not elected
2014	Coventry St. Michael's	TUSC	974	29.7	Not elected
2015	Coventry St. Michael's	TUSC	894	28.3	Not elected
2016	Coventry St. Michael's	TUSC	635	19.2	Not elected
2018	Coventry St. Michael's	TUSC	350	12.8	Not elected
2024	Coventry St. Michael's	TUSC	346	9.7	Not elected
2024	Coventry St. Michael's	TUSC	327	17.9	Not elected

European elections

Date of election	Constituency	Party	Votes	%	Results	Notes
1999	West Midlands	Socialist Party^{1}	7,203	0.8	Not elected	Multi member constituencies; party list
2009	West Midlands	No2EU	13,415	1.0	Not elected	Multi member constituencies; party list
2014	West Midlands	No2EU	4,653	0.3	Not elected	Multi member constituencies; party list

=== Notes ===
1 – Nellist appeared on the ballot paper as "Socialist Alternative", which is the Socialist Party's description registered with the electoral commission.

Parliament of the United Kingdom
Preceded by Bill Wilson	Member of Parliament for Coventry South East; 1983–1992	Succeeded by Jim Cunningham
