= Shabbir Ahmed =

Shabbir Ahmed, Shabbir Ahmad, Shabir Ahmed, or Shabir Ahmad may refer to:

== Political candidates ==
- Shabbir Ahmad, a Samajwadi Party member in the 1993 Uttar Pradesh Legislative Assembly election, India
- Shabbir Ahmed, a Liberal Democrat in the 1998 Pendle Borough Council election in the borough of Pendle, UK
- Shabbir Ahmed, a Conservative in the 2002 Coventry City Council election in Coventry, UK
- Shabir Ahmad, a Muttahida Majlis-e-Amal member who won the 2002 general election in NA-32 Peshawar-V, Pakistan
- Shabbir Ahmed, a Conservative in the 2003 Coventry City Council election
- Shabir Ahmed, a Labour in the 2006 Ealing London Borough Council election in London, UK
- Shabbir Ahmad, a Samajwati Party member in the 2014 Indian general election; see Results of the 2014 Indian general election
- Shabbir Ahmad, an independent candidate in the 2016 elections of Constituency LA-44, Pakistan
- Shabir Ahmed, a Labour in the 2018 Ealing London Borough Council election
- Shabir Ahmed, a Pakistan Muslim League (N) member in the 2018 elections of PP-29 Gujrat-II, Pakistan
- Shabbir Ahmad, a Samajwadi Party member in the 2019 elections of Bahraich Lok Sabha constituency, Uttar Pradesh, India

== Other people ==
- Shabbir Ahmed (cricketer) (born 1976), a Pakistani cricketer
- Shabbir Ahmed (lyricist), an Indian Bollywood lyricist
- Shabbir Ahmed (kabaddi) (born 1983), a Pakistani international kabaddi player
- Shabir Ahmed (Guantanamo captive), an Afghan detained at Guantanamo Bay from 2003 to 2007
- Shabbir Ahmed, the director of the Bollywood film Chintu Ji (2009)
- Shabbir Ahmed, the assistant secretary of the Alpine Club of Pakistan from 1978 to 1995
- Shabbīr Aḥmad, a mufti and student of Habibur Rahman Khairabadi
- Shabbir Ahmad, the chief administrator of the Pakistani student org Islami Jamiat-e-Talaba from 1979 to 1982
- Shabir Ahmed, a British Pakistani man in the Rochdale child sex abuse ring (operating 2008–2009 in Rochdale, UK)
- Shabir Ahmed, the tehsildar of Bharat Bagla, Jammu and Kashmir, India
- Shabir Ahmed, a lyricist credited in Zindagi (album), a 2007 album by Indian musician Zubeen Garg
- Shabir Ahmed, a Pakistani CEO; see List of foreign recipients of the National Order of Merit#Pakistan
- Shabir Ahmed, a person arrested in relation to the Lynching of Mashal Khan
- Shabir Ahmad, a Finnish cricketer in the 2011 ICC European T20 Championship Division Two
- Shabir Ahmad, an author specializing in sales and management. He has written books including Evolution of Sales Methodologies, Selling in the Middle East and The Inspired Manager.
