= 2008 Coventry City Council election =

2008 UK local government election

Map of the results of the 2008 Coventry election. Conservatives in blue, Liberal Democrats in yellow, Labour in light red, Socialist Party in dark red.

Elections for Coventry City Council were held on Thursday 1 May 2008. As the council is elected by thirds, one seat in each of the wards was up for election.

The Labour Party gained two seats (Radford, whose sitting councillor had been elected for Labour but later switched parties, and Foleshill) from the Conservative Party and the Conservatives gained one seat (Westwood) from Labour.

The Conservative Party lost overall control of the council, but remained the ruling party, with half of the seats.

== Election results ==
Coventry local election result 2008
Party	Seats	Gains	Losses	Net gain/loss	Seats %	Votes %	Votes	+/−
Conservative	9	1	2	-1	50.00	37.92	26,591	+3.85
Labour	7	2	1	+1	38.90	35.60	24,964	-2.73
Liberal Democrats	1	0	0	0	5.55	8.07	5,661	-2.12
Socialist Alternative	1	0	0	0	5.55	2.74	1,920	+3.07
BNP	0	0	0	0	0.00	7.90	5,535	-0.63
Green	0	0	0	0	0.00	5.11	3,584	+2.04
Independent	0	0	0	0	0.00	2.66	1,865	-0.34

== Council Composition ==
The composition of the council before and after the election can be found in the following table:

Party	Previous council	Staying councillors	Seats up for election	Election result	New council
Conservative	28	19	10	9	27
Labour	23	17	6	7	24
Socialist Alternative	2	1	1	1	2
Liberal Democrats	1	0	1	1	1
BNP	0	0	0	0	0
Green	0	0	0	0	0
Independent	0	0	0	0	0
Total	54	36	18	18	54

== Ward results ==
Note: Gains and holds of wards are noted with respect to the 2006 council election except for Radford – where the seat changed hands by defection.. Percentage changes are given with respect to the 2007 council election.

Turnout figures include spoilt ballots.

Bablake ward
Party	Candidate	Votes	%	±%
Conservative	John Victor Gazey	2,546	58.74	+10.78
Labour	Bilal Akhtar	917	21.16	−4.71
BNP	Michele Jean Stone	443	10.22	+1.17
Green	Ryan David Taylor	428	9.88	+4.26
Majority		1,629	37.59	+15.51
Turnout		4,334	36.33	−1.37
Conservative hold		Swing		

Binley and Willenhall ward
Party	Candidate	Votes	%	±%
Labour	David Chater	1,467	42.42	−3.97
Conservative	Julia Elizabeth Lepoidevin	1,021	29.53	+2.50
BNP	Mark Badrick	437	12.64	−2.38
Liberal Democrats	Brian Anthony McCarney	389	11.25	+3.06
Green	Kenneth Christopher Jones	144	4.16	+0.79
Majority		446	12.90	−6.45
Turnout		3,458	28.94	−3.46
Labour hold		Swing		

Cheylesmore ward
Party	Candidate	Votes	%	±%
Conservative	Hazel Margaret Noonan	1,903	46.63	−1.88
Labour	Catherine Elizabeth Miks	1,224	29.99	−1.64
BNP	Carl Stew	385	9.44	+1.19
Liberal Democrats	Terence Kenny	351	8.60	−0.16
Green	Aisa Kara	218	5.34	−2.32
Majority		679	16.64	+5.78
Turnout		4,081	34.33	−2.07
Conservative hold		Swing		

Earlsdon ward
Party	Candidate	Votes	%	±%
Conservative	Allan Robert Andrews	2,515	52.31	+3.8
Labour	Christopher Nicholas Youett	1,155	24.02	−1.44
Green	Scott Redding	698	14.52	+1.14
Liberal Democrats	Napier Penlington	440	9.15	+0.39
Majority		1,360	28.29	+5.24
Turnout		4,808	40.36	−1.60
Conservative hold		Swing		

Foleshill ward
Party	Candidate	Votes	%	±%
Labour	Malkiat Singh Auluck	2,180	50.57	−7.20
Conservative	Shabbir Ahmed	1,885	43.72	+13.26
Green	Penny Walker	246	5.71	+3.65
Majority		295	6.84	−20.46
Turnout		4,311	39.84	−4.63
Labour gain from Conservative		Swing		

Henley ward
Party	Candidate	Votes	%	±%
Labour	Ed Ruane	1,483	38.34	−11.05
Independent	Brian David Patton	950	24.56	N/A
Conservative	Val Stone	947	24.48	−2.4
BNP	Simon Bien	488	12.62	+0.15
Majority		533	13.78	−8.73
Turnout		3,868	30.04	+2.18
Labour hold		Swing		

Holbrook ward
Party	Candidate	Votes	%	±%
Labour	Joe Clifford	1,821	53.45	+4.79
Conservative	Hazel Ann Reece	1.077	31.61	+7.38
BNP	Simon Bien	509	14.94	+1.82
Majority		744	21.84	−2.59
Turnout		3,407	28.76	−0.91
Labour hold		Swing		

Longford ward
Party	Candidate	Votes	%	±%
Labour	George Arthur Duggins	1,831	53.15	−3.63
Conservative	Harbans Singh Gumman	762	22.12	−7.43
BNP	Susan Gail Hillen	430	12.48	+4.65
Liberal Democrats	Charles Coleman	286	8.30	N/A
Green	Natalia Grana	136	3.95	−1.49
Majority		1,069	31.03	+3.8
Turnout		3,445	27.07	−2.16
Labour hold		Swing		

Lower Stoke ward
Party	Candidate	Votes	%	±%
Labour	Jack Harrison	1,682	44.59	−1.61
Conservative	Vinod Dogra	858	22.75	−4.31
Independent	Christine Margaret Oddy	405	10.74	−5.31
BNP	Darren Thomas	359	9.52	−1.17
Liberal Democrats	Christine Marion Coleman	308	8.16	N/A
Green	Laura Vesty	160	4.24	N/A
Majority		824	21.85	+2.71
Turnout		3,772	31.18	−2.21
Labour hold		Swing		

Radford ward
Party	Candidate	Votes	%	±%
Labour	Mal Mutton	1,444	46.40	−4.77
Conservative	Jane Marie Williams	796	25.58	+4.97
BNP	Thomas Paul Jones	344	11.05	0.00
Liberal Democrats	Frances Hilda Hawkey	273	8.77	+0.09
Green	Cathy Wattebot	131	4.21	−0.22
Independent	Dave Anderson	124	3.99	−0.22
Majority		648	20.82	−9.73
Turnout		3,112	25.30	−2.34
Labour gain from Conservative		Swing		

Sherbourne ward
Party	Candidate	Votes	%	±%
Conservative	Gary Christopher Ridley	1,546	43.04	+10.49
Labour	Seamus Walsh	1,123	31.26	−0.7
Liberal Democrats	Stella Hewison	312	8.69	−1.97
BNP	Justin Baldwin	280	7.79	−0.1
Green	Charlotte Tittle	196	5.46	N/A
Socialist Alternative	Jason Arnold Toynbee	135	3.76	−1.87
Majority		423	11.78	+11.18
Turnout		3,592	29.90	−1.49
Conservative hold		Swing		

St Michael's ward
Party	Candidate	Votes	%	±%
Socialist Alternative	Dave Nellist	1,643	48.64	+8.15
Labour	Motasem Ali	1,336	39.55	−3.88
Conservative	Charles Stephen Cox	399	11.81	−4.27
Majority		307	9.09	+6.15
Turnout		3,378	26.10	+0.53
Socialist Alternative hold		Swing		

Upper Stoke ward
Party	Candidate	Votes	%	±%
Liberal Democrats	Russell David Field	1,694	43.95	+5.97
Labour	David Stewart Welsh	1,506	39.08	+1.03
Conservative	Ian Ewart Johnson	482	12.51	+0.27
Green	Bryn Tittle	172	4.46	N/A
Majority		188	4.88	+4.81
Turnout		3,854	31.39	−4.21
Liberal Democrats hold		Swing		

Wainbody ward
Party	Candidate	Votes	%	±%
Conservative	John Anthony Blundell	2,470	61.05	+5.54
Labour	Randhir Kaur Auluck	755	18.66	−4.77
Liberal Democrats	Vincent John McKee	468	11.57	−0.94
Green	John Walton	353	8.72	+0.17
Majority		1,715	42.39	+10.31
Turnout		4,046	32.71	−2.59
Conservative hold		Swing		

Westwood ward
Party	Candidate	Votes	%	±%
Conservative	Marcus Edgar Lapsa	1,713	43.16	+5.06
Labour	Dave Batten	1,389	34.99	−0.44
BNP	Matthew Mason	425	10.71	−1.47
Liberal Democrats	Jacqueline Bridget Basu	277	6.98	−3.01
Green	Jesse Meadows	165	4.16	N/A
Majority		324	8.16	+5.49
Turnout		3,969	32.11	−0.09
Conservative gain from Labour		Swing		

Whoberley ward
Party	Candidate	Votes	%	±%
Conservative	Roger Maurice James Bailey	1,586	38.28	+3.14
Labour	Bally Singh	1,372	33.12	+1.24
Liberal Democrats	Brian Rees Lewis	328	7.92	−7.57
BNP	Anthony Angliss	300	7.24	−0.40
Independent	Joan Ann Griffin	222	5.36	−4.49
Green	Gianluca Grimalda	193	4.65	N/A
Socialist Alternative	Jim Donnelly	142	3.43	N/A
Majority		214	5.17	+1.91
Turnout		4,143	34.10	−0.03
Conservative hold		Swing		

Woodlands ward
Party	Candidate	Votes	%	±%
Conservative	Heather Jean Johnson	2,206	49.83	+2.49
Labour	Shagufta Hamid-Khan	791	17.88	−2.32
BNP	David Clarke	720	16.26	+0.36
Liberal Democrats	Stephen Howarth	535	12.08	−4.48
Green	Danny Foulstone	175	3.95	N/A
Majority		1,415	31.96	+4.82
Turnout		4,427	35.70	−0.21
Conservative hold		Swing		

Wyken ward
Party	Candidate	Votes	%	±%
Conservative	Susanna Ella Dixon	1,879	45.66	+10.67
Labour	Faye Sweet	1,488	36.16	−3.23
BNP	Steven John Pittaway	415	10.09	−0.69
Green	Jo Rathbone	169	4.11	N/A
Independent	Adrian Roll	84	2.04	+0.08
Independent	Mick Noonan	80	1.94	−2.14
Majority		391	9.50	+5.1
Turnout		4,115	33.83	+0.02
Conservative hold		Swing		
