= 2006 Coventry City Council election =

2006 UK local government election

← 2004	4 May 2006	2007 →

18 of the 54 seats on Coventry City Council 28 seats needed for a majority
	First party	Second party	Third party
Party	Conservative	Labour	Socialist Alternative
Seats won	10	7	1
Seats after	29	19	3
Seat change	▲2	▼1	▲1
Popular vote	26,451	25,012	2,750
Percentage	37.4%	35.4%	3.9%
Swing	▲2.5%	▲2.6%	▼2.8%
- Labour in red, Conservatives in blue and Socialist Alternative in burgundy.
Council control before election
No overall control
Council control after election
Conservative

Elections to Coventry City Council were held on 4 May 2006. One third of the council was up for election and the Conservative party took overall control of the council.

After the election, the composition of the council was

- Conservative 29
- Labour 19
- Socialist Alternative 3
- Liberal Democrat 2
- Independent 1

On 25 October 2006 Kate Hunter, a Councillor for Radford Ward, moved from the Labour Party to the Conservative Party.

On 17 January 2007 Val Stone, a former Councillor for Longford Ward, moved from being an Independent to the Conservative Party.

In April 2007 Mick Noonan, a Councillor for Wyken Ward, and Heather Rutter, a Councillor for Sherbourne Ward, moved from the Conservative Party to being Independents.

== Election result ==
Coventry local election result 2006
Party	Seats	Gains	Losses	Net gain/loss	Seats %	Votes %	Votes	+/−
Conservative	10	2	0	+2	53.70	37.41	26,451	
Labour	7	2	3	-1	35.19	35.38	25,012	
Socialist Alternative	1	1	0	+1	5.56	3.89	2,750	
Liberal Democrats	0	0	1	-1	3.70	14.64	10,348	
Independent	0	0	0	0	1.85	0.93	659	
Other	0	0	1	-1	0.00	7.75	5,476	

== Ward results ==
Bablake ward
Party	Candidate	Votes	%	±%
Conservative	Andrew John Williams	2,368	54.54	
Labour	Christopher Nicholas Youett	1,213	27.93	
Liberal Democrats	Peter Simpson	761	17.53	
Majority		1,155	26.60	
Turnout		4,342		
Conservative hold		Swing		

Binley and Willenhall ward
Party	Candidate	Votes	%	±%
Labour	John Roderick Mutton	1,553	39.63	
Conservative	Allan Robert Andrews	1,211	30.90	
BNP	Peter Hanbury	727	18.55	
Liberal Democrats	Geoffrey Brian Sewards	428	10.92	
Majority		342	8.73	
Turnout		3,919		
Labour hold		Swing		

Cheylesmore ward
Party	Candidate	Votes	%	±%
Conservative	Linda Ann Reece	1,890	43.12	
Labour	Jean Jackson	1,392	31.76	
Liberal Democrats	Terence Kenny	601	13.71	
BNP	Jeanette Boyce	500	11.41	
Majority		498	11.36	
Turnout		4,383		
Conservative hold		Swing		

Earlsdon ward
Party	Candidate	Votes	%	±%
Conservative	Andrew Macdonald Matchet	2,520	49.73	
Labour	Bilal Akhtar	1,073	21.17	
Green	Scott Gordon Redding	805	15.88	
Liberal Democrats	Vincent John McKee	670	13.22	
Majority		1,447	28.55	
Turnout		5,068		
Conservative hold		Swing		

Foleshill ward
Party	Candidate	Votes	%	±%
Conservative	Altaf Hussain Adalat	1,847	44.86	
Labour	Malkiat Singh Auluck	1,841	44.72	
Liberal Democrats	Susan Jane Johnston-Wilder	266	6.46	
BNP	Thomas Paul Jones	163	3.96	
Majority		6	0.15	
Turnout		4,117		
Conservative gain from Labour		Swing		

Henley ward
Party	Candidate	Votes	%	±%
Labour	Kevin Barry Maton	1,475	43.73	
Conservative	Kenneth George Armstrong	1,326	39.31	
Socialist Alternative	Esther Josephine Kenny	572	16.96	
Majority		149	4.42	
Turnout		3,373		
Labour hold		Swing		

Holbrook ward
Party	Candidate	Votes	%	±%
Labour	Evelyn Ann Lucas	1,658	46.81	
Conservative	Brinder Seni	871	24.59	
Liberal Democrats	Dennis Herbert Jeffery	544	15.36	
BNP	Simon Daniel Bien	469	13.24	
Majority		787	22.22	
Turnout		3,542		
Labour hold		Swing		

Longford ward
Party	Candidate	Votes	%	±%
Labour	Lindsley Harvard	1,487	43.52	
Independent Voice of Longford	Val Stone	1,091	31.93	
Conservative	Harry Maeers	554	16.21	
Liberal Democrats	Derek Arthur Franklin	285	8.34	
Majority		396	11.59	
Turnout		3,417		
Labour gain from Independent		Swing		

Lower Stoke ward
Party	Candidate	Votes	%	±%
Labour	Philip David Townshend	1,483	38.55	
Conservative	Michael Antony Hammon	1,076	27.97	
Independent	Christine Margaret Oddy	539	14.01	
Liberal Democrats	Richard Ian Kay	457	11.88	
Socialist Alternative	David Bryan Runnalls	292	7.59	
Majority		893	23.21	
Turnout		3,847		
Labour hold		Swing		

Radford ward
Party	Candidate	Votes	%	±%
Labour	Keiran Pascal Mulhall	1,564	47.62	
Conservative	David Vincent Smith	692	21.07	
Liberal Democrats	Peter Jonathan Johnston-Wilder	433	13.19	
BNP	Tracey Katie Whitehouse	415	12.64	
Independent	David Anderson	180	5.48	
Majority		872	26.55	
Turnout		3,284		
Labour hold		Swing		

Sherbourne ward
Party	Candidate	Votes	%	±%
Conservative	David Arrowsmith	1,457	40.70	
Labour	Howard Peter Lacy	1,169	32.65	
Liberal Democrats	Arthur Hugh Thomas	597	16.68	
Socialist Alternative	Jason Arnold Toynbee	357	9.97	
Majority		288	8.04	
Turnout		3,580		
Conservative hold		Swing		

St Michael's ward
Party	Candidate	Votes	%	±%
Socialist Alternative	Robert Piers Windsor	1,191	40.06	
Labour	Suleman Ismail Bhyat	1,106	37.20	
Conservative	Jane Marie Williams	428	14.40	
Liberal Democrats	Daniel Robert Searles	248	8.34	
Majority		85	2.86	
Turnout		2,973		
Socialist Alternative gain from Labour		Swing		

Upper Stoke ward
Party	Candidate	Votes	%	±%
Labour	Sucha Singh Bains	1,792	44.70	
Liberal Democrats	Susan Jane Johnston-Wilder	1,762	43.95	
Conservative	Harbans Singh Gumman	455	11.35	
Majority		30	0.75	
Turnout		4,009		
Labour gain from Liberal Democrats		Swing		

Wainbody ward
Party	Candidate	Votes	%	±%
Conservative	Gary Edward Crookes	2,612	59.69	
Labour	Joseph Akpati Ijoma	1,013	23.15	
Liberal Democrats	Gilbert Napier Penlington	751	17.16	
Majority		1,599	36.54	
Turnout		4,376		
Conservative hold		Swing		

Westwood ward
Party	Candidate	Votes	%	±%
Conservative	David John Skinner	1,566	39.99	
Labour	Sheila Lacy	1,374	35.09	
BNP	Mark Badrick	473	12.08	
Liberal Democrats	Edward Rhys Williams	383	9.78	
Independent	Henderson Easton Brooks	120	3.06	
Majority		192	4.90	
Turnout		3,916		
Conservative gain from Labour		Swing		

Whoberley ward
Party	Candidate	Votes	%	±%
Conservative	Clifford Leonard Ridge	1,701	41.90	
Labour	David Stuart Welsh	1,285	31.65	
Liberal Democrats	Brian Rees Lewis	736	18.13	
Socialist Alternative	Ross Saunders	338	8.32	
Majority		416	10.25	
Turnout		4,060		
Conservative hold		Swing		

Woodlands ward
Party	Candidate	Votes	%	±%
Conservative	Anthony John O'Neill	2,205	48.95	
Labour	Abdul Salam Khan	922	20.47	
Liberal Democrats	Stephen Howarth	725	16.09	
BNP	Julie Margaret Allen	653	14.49	
Majority		1,283	28.48	
Turnout		4,505		
Conservative hold		Swing		

Wyken ward
Party	Candidate	Votes	%	±%
Conservative	Angela Marie Waters	1,672	41.96	
Labour	Hazel Jean Sweet	1,612	40.45	
Liberal Democrats	Adrian Edward Dyke	701	17.59	
Majority		60	1.51	
Turnout		3,985		
Conservative hold		Swing		
