= St. Michael's, Coventry =

Electoral ward in Coventry, West Midlands, England

St Michael's is an electoral ward in Coventry, West Midlands, England. The ward's population is 21,700 (2010). In 2001, its population was 56% White British and 23% Asian or Asian British, many of whom were Bangladeshi. The ward includes many students, and 20- to 24-year-olds make up over 20% of the population. The ward population had increased to 24,119 at the 2011 Census.

According to the city's 2007 Index of Deprivation, St Michael's is the second most deprived ward of the city. While the average household income in Coventry was £31,697 in 2008, it was £25,372 in St Michael's, making it the second poorest ward, though it grew by 24.5% since 2005, which is a more rapid pace of growth than that of the Coventry average (14.5%). Similarly, the crime rate in St Michael's was slightly over three times as high as that of Coventry as a whole in 2007, but it had fallen by 34% since 2004/'05, when it was over four times as high. The unemployment rate in the ward was 4.6% in September 2008, when that of Coventry as a whole was 3.6%, but in 2001 unemployment in St Michael's was still twice as high as in Coventry overall (6.2% vs. 3.0%). That change may however also be due to boundary changes in 2004.

Currently, the ward contains the city centre of Coventry, including St. Michael's Cathedral and the neighbourhoods of Charterhouse and Hillfields. Hillfields is undergoing large-scale changes, which encompass the demolition of Coventry City's Highfield Road stadium and what the Coventry City Council describes as "the biggest single regeneration project in Coventry".

St Michael's ward is represented by three Labour Councillors. They are Naeem Akhtar (term of office: 2016–2021), Jim O'Boyle (2019–2023) and Sanjida Jobbar (2024).

== 2024 Election ==
St Michael's
Party	Candidate	Votes	%	±%
Labour	Sanjida Jobbar	899	49%	−21%
TUSC	Dave Nellist	327	18%	+9%
Workers Party	Ejaz Janjua	212	12%	+12%
Conservative	Mehmet Yetkin	145	8%	−2%
Green	Thomas James Jewell	96	5%	+1%
Coventry Citizens Party	Karen Wilson	94	5%	+1%
Liberal Democrat	Robyn Clare Simpson	57	3%	
Turnout		1,830		
Labour hold		Swing		

== 2022 Election ==
St Michael's
Party	Candidate	Votes	%	±%
Labour	David Stuart Welsh	1,898	70%	+3%
Conservative	Mary Taylor	270	10%	−3%
TUSC	Dave Nellist	257	9%	
Green	David Neil Priestley	181	7%	+2%
Coventry Citizens Party	Karen Wilson	114	4%	+1%
Turnout		2,720		
Labour hold		Swing		

== 2021 Election ==
St Michael's
Party	Candidate	Votes	%	±%
Labour	Naeem Akhtar	2,028	67%	−2%
Conservative	Daniel James Partington	385	13%	+4%
TUSC	Dave Nellist	274	9%	−6%
Green	Allan John Aspinall	166	5%	−2%
Coventry Citizens Party	Karen Wilson	100	3%	
Liberal Democrat	Benoit David Jones	94	3%	
Turnout		3,047		
Labour hold		Swing		

== 2019 Election ==
St Michael's
Party	Candidate	Votes	%	±%
Labour	Jim O'Boyle	1,765	69%	+2.9%
TUSC	Dave Nellist	396	15%	+8%
Conservative	Mary Taylor	224	9%	+3%
Green	Joe McAvoy-Boss	190	7%	+4%
Turnout		2,575		
Labour hold		Swing		

== 2018 Election ==
St Michael's
Party	Candidate	Votes	%	±%
Labour	David Stuart Welsh	1,952	66.1%	+24.1%
TUSC	Dave Nellist	350	7%	−12.8%
Conservative	Mark Andrew Lerigo	275	6%	−2.5%
Green	Aimee Challenor	146	3%	−2.5%
Turnout		4.675		
Labour hold		Swing		

== 2016 Election ==
St Michael's
Party	Candidate	Votes	%	±%
Labour	Naeem Akhtar	3,158	66.1%	+8.3%
TUSC	Dave Nellist	635	19.8%	+3.5%
Conservative	Christopher Michael Noonan	274	8.5%	−3.5%
Green	Aimee Challenor	178	5.5%	−0.9%
Turnout		3,209	24.91%	−20.83%
Labour hold		Swing		

== 2015 election ==
St Michael's
Party	Candidate	Votes	%	±%
Labour	Jim O'Boyle	3,158	57.8%	+0.7%
TUSC	Dave Nellist	894	16.3%	−13.4%
Conservative	Jennifer Clare Wells	656	12.0%	+4.0%
UKIP	Wayne Geoffrey Newman	408	7.5%	
Green	Tristan Hamish Mackrory	352	6.4%	+1.1%
Turnout		5,468	45.74%	+23.43%
Labour hold		Swing		

== 2014 election ==
St Michael's
Party	Candidate	Votes	%	±%
Labour	David Welsh	1,872	57.1%	+7.7%
TUSC	Dave Nellist	974	29.7%	
Conservative	Maharshi Shrimali	261	8.0%	+0.8%
Green	Scott Redding	174	5.3%	
Turnout		3,281	22.31%	+1.12%
Labour hold		Swing		

== 2012 election ==
St Michael's
Party	Candidate	Votes	%	±%
Labour	Naeem Akhtar	1673	49.4%	
Socialist	Dave Nellist	1,469	43.4%	
Conservative	Christian Michael Cliffe	243	7.2%	
Turnout		3,385	21.19%	
Labour gain from Socialist		Swing		
