= 2012 Coventry City Council election =

2012 UK local government election

Map of the 2012 Coventry election. Conservatives in blue, Labour in red

Elections for Coventry City Council were held on Thursday, 3 May 2012, the same day as other 2012 local elections in the United Kingdom. As the council is elected by thirds, one seat in each of the city's 18 wards was up for election. The Labour Party won the seat in 15 of the wards, gaining a total of 8 and increasing their majority to 32 seats. The Conservative Party won the remaining three seats, losing six, with the Liberal Democrats and the Socialist Party both losing their only seat on the council.

The election coincided with a local referendum on whether to have an elected mayor.

== Campaign ==
The Conservative party focused their efforts on retaining their existing seats, campaigning on issues like the closure of Sure Start centres, disruption caused by rebuilding the city centre, and an alternative budget proposal. Labour focused on their aim of protecting frontline services, rebuilding the city centre for the Olympics (Coventry hosted several football events), and fixing potholes. Liberal Democrat councillor Russell Field focused on his record in working for his ward. The Socialists supported an independent candidate in Foleshill who is campaigning against the planned closure of a local sports centre. They focused on "stiffening the resistance to coalition cuts to this city" and accused Labour of signing up to coalition austerity plans. The Greens focused on alternative plans for the city, including an insulation scheme for homes and instituting a Living Wage for council employees. UKIP was focussing on local issues.

== Results ==
Voter turnout was 26%.

Coventry City Council Election, 2012
Party	Seats	Gains	Losses	Net gain/loss	Seats %	Votes %	Votes	+/−
Labour	15	8	0	+8	83%	53.72%	32,414	-0.88%
Conservative	3	0	6	-6	17%	26.36%	16,755	-0.14%
Socialist	0	0	1	-1	0	5.35%	3401	+1.66%
Green	0	0	0	0	0	5.05%	3212	+0.11%
Liberal Democrats	0	0	1	-1	0	3.91%	2486	-1.27%
BNP	0	0	0	0	0	2.70%	1718	-0.95%
UKIP	0	0	0	0	0	2.29%	1457	+1.44%
Independent	0	0	0	0	0	1.71%	1085	+1.13%
Christian Movement for Great Britain	0	0	0	0	0	0.80%	511	N/A
TOTAL	18	8	8	0		100%	63,572	

=== Council composition ===
The composition of the council before and after the election can be found in the following table:

Party	Previous council	Staying councillors	Seats up for election	Election result	New council
Labour	35	28	7	15	43
Conservatives	17	8	9	3	11
Socialist Alternative	1	0	1	0	0
Green	0	0	0	0	0
Liberal Democrats	1	0	1	0	0
British National Party	0	0	0	0	0
UKIP	0	0	0	0	0
Christian Movement for Great Britain	0	0	0	0	0
Independent	0	0	0	0	0
Total	54	36	18	18	54

=== Results by ward ===
Note: For all wards, the percentage change is calculated from the council local election in 2011 (the last time the ward was contested), whilst the gains, losses, and holds are calculated from 2008 (the last time these particular seats were contested).

Bablake Ward
Party	Candidate	Votes	%	±%
Labour	David John Galliers	1502	37.3%	−11.6%
Conservative	Jaswant Singh Birdi	1302	32.3%	−1.8%
Independent	John Gazey	669	16.6%	N/A
BNP	Betty Booton	179	4.4%	+0.6%
Green	Walter William Milner	141	3.5%	−0.7%
Liberal Democrats	Peter Simpson	122	3.0%	−1.2%
Socialist	Jethro Waldron	48	1.2%	+0.4%
Christian Movement for Great Britain	Louise Lebar	35	0.9%	N/A
Majority		200	5.0%	
Turnout		4028	32.38%	−10.27%
Labour gain from Conservative		Swing		

Note for Bablake ward: Independent candidate John Gazey was the sitting councillor for the Conservative party. After being deselected he decided to run as an independent.

Binley and Willenhall Ward
Party	Candidate	Votes	%	±%
Labour	Dave Chater	1898	58.29%	−0.07%
Conservative	Linda Ann Reece	570	17.51%	−5.73%
UKIP	Colin Aldous Stubbs	503	15.45%	+7.57%
BNP	David Clarke	100	3.07%	−1.89%
Green	Justin Wood	95	2.92%	−0.03%
Socialist	Ross Armstrong	67	2.06%	+0.17%
Majority		1328	40.79%	−5.67%
Turnout		3256	25.43%	−7.73%
Labour hold		Swing		

Cheylesmore Ward
Party	Candidate	Votes	%	±%
Conservative	Hazel Margaret Noonan	1992	48.46%	+0.27%
Labour	Anne Frances Arlidge	1688	41.06%	−1.24%
Green	John Verdult	266	6.47%	+0.07%
Socialist	Judy Griffiths	141	3.43%	+0.32%
Majority		304	7.39%	+2.8%
Turnout		4111	25.04%	−16.92%
Conservative hold		Swing		

Earlsdon Ward
Party	Candidate	Votes	%	±%
Conservative	Allan Robert Andrews	2137	46.29%	+3.21%
Labour	Bilal Akhtar	1442	31.23%	−9.96%
Green	Scott Gordon Redding	327	7.08%	+1.39%
UKIP	James Michael Bowes	272	5.89%	N/A
Liberal Democrats	Derek Stephen Benefield	261	5.65%	−2.13%
Socialist	Fiona Pashazadeh	116	2.51%	+0.25%
Christian Movement for Great Britain	William Sidhu	43	0.93%	N/A
Majority		695	15.05%	+13.16%
Turnout		4617	37.03%	−11.73%
Conservative hold		Swing		

Foleshill Ward
Party	Candidate	Votes	%	±%
Labour	Malkiat Singh Auluck	2112	57.33%	−9.57%
Conservative	Shabbir Ahmed	1114	30.24%	+6.62%
Independent	William Bromwich	213	5.78%	N/A
Green	Rana Sumra	80	2.17%	−0.62%
Christian Movement for Great Britain	Ron Lebar	71	1.93%	N/A
BNP	Hunter Helmsley	61	1.66%	−0.97%
Majority		998	27.09%	
Turnout		3684	29.70%	−9.65%
Labour hold		Swing		

Henley Ward
Party	Candidate	Votes	%	±%
Labour	Ed Ruane	2036	60.42%	+3.06%
Liberal Democrats	Brian David Patton	488	14.48%	−13.38%
Conservative	Steven Henry Charles Keough	393	11.66%	N/A
BNP	Rose Morris	243	7.21%	−0.81%
Green	George Robinson	121	3.59%	−0.48%
Socialist	Siobhan Friel	80	2.37%	−0.32%
Majority		1548	45.93%	
Turnout		3370	25.10%	−7.08%
Labour hold		Swing		

Holbrook Ward
Party	Candidate	Votes	%	±%
Labour	Rachel Elizabeth Lancaster	2087	68.63%	+3.2%
Conservative	Val Stone	404	13.29%	−7.72%
Green	Stephen Gray	215	7.07%	+1.38%
BNP	Mark Badrick	211	6.94%	+1.04%
Socialist	Jim Hensman	99	3.26%	+1.92%
Majority		1683	55.34%	
Turnout		3041	24.18%	−10.22%
Labour hold		Swing		

Longford Ward
Party	Candidate	Votes	%	±%
Labour	George Duggins	2409	72.30%	−0.23%
Christian Movement for Great Britain	Raj Kumar	362	10.86%	N/A
BNP	Frankie Bates	203	6.09%	+0.05%
Green	Paul Andrew	163	4.89%	+0.95%
Socialist	Craig Davenport	111	3.33%	+0.92%
Conservative	Dial Masih	58	1.74%	−12.64%
Majority		2047	61.43%	
Turnout		3332	24.68	−6.72%
Labour hold		Swing		

Lower Stoke Ward
Party	Candidate	Votes	%	±%
Labour	Catherine Elizabeth Miks	1748	54.20%	−2.99%
Conservative	Michael Arthur Ballinger	484	15.01%	−7.31%
Socialist	Rob McArdle	310	9.61%	+3.23%
UKIP	John Bevan	233	7.22%	N/A
Liberal Democrats	James Henry White	168	5.21%	N/A
Green	Laura Vesty	161	4.99%	−2.75%
BNP	Keith Oxford	101	3.13%	−2.59%
Majority		1264	39.19%	
Turnout		3225	23.85%	−10.85%
Labour hold		Swing		

Radford Ward
Party	Candidate	Votes	%	±%
Labour	Mal Mutton	1896	65.47%	+0.6%
Conservative	Mary Taylor	498	17.20%	−0.19%
Green	Gavin Collins	210	7.25%	+1.63%
Socialist	Glen Watson	142	4.90%	+2.56%
BNP	Ian Wankling	126	4.35%	−0.75%
Majority		1398	48.27%	
Turnout		2896	21.44%	−8.51%
Labour hold		Swing		

Sherbourne Ward
Party	Candidate	Votes	%	±%
Labour	Alison Jane Gingell	1833	57.21%	+2.04%
Conservative	Leon Victor Emirali	705	22.00%	−5.12%
Green	John Griffiths	225	7.02%	+2.36%
BNP	Leisel Wagstaff	173	5.40%	+1.27%
Socialist	Jason Toynbee	145	4.53%	+2.05%
Liberal Democrats	Christopher Glenn	96	3.00%	−2.95%
Majority		1128	35.21%	
Turnout		3204	25.08%	−12.57%
Labour gain from Conservative		Swing		

St. Michael's Ward
Party	Candidate	Votes	%	±%
Labour	Naeem Akhtar	1,673	49.03%	−9.04%
Socialist	Dave Nellist	1,469	43.05%	+12.73%
Conservative	Christian Michael Cliffe	243	7.12%	−3.3%
Majority		204	5.98%	
Turnout		3413	21.19	−5.48%
Labour gain from Socialist		Swing		

Upper Stoke Ward
Party	Candidate	Votes	%	±%
Labour	Kamran Asif Caan	2024	57.85%	−0.84%
Liberal Democrats	Russell David Field	682	19.49%	+1.00%
Conservative	Denise Beech	275	7.86%	−3.90%
Green	John Halpin	213	6.09%	+2.41%
BNP	John Hurren	156	4.46%	+2.26%
Socialist	Paul Smith	120	3.43%	+1.23%
Majority		1342	38.35%	
Turnout		3499	26.00%	−7.00%
Labour gain from Liberal Democrats		Swing		

Wainbody Ward
Party	Candidate	Votes	%	±%
Conservative	John Anthony Blundell	1540	42.09%	−1.49%
Labour	Martin Patrick Hartnett	1214	33.19%	−0.74%
UKIP	Mark Taylor	449	12.27%	+5.53%
Green	Danny Foulstone	210	5.74%	−1.25%
Liberal Democrats	Napier Penlington	172	4.70%	−2.59%
Socialist	Dan Crowter	54	1.48%	0.00%
Majority		326	8.91%	
Turnout		3659	28.45%	−16.55%
Conservative hold		Swing		

Westwood Ward
Party	Candidate	Votes	%	±%
Labour	Maya Ali	1418	41.73%	−5.15%
Conservative	Marcus Edgar Lapsa	1346	39.61%	+1.13%
Green	Merle Gering	183	5.39%	−0.86%
BNP	Darren Thomas	165	4.86%	−0.63%
Liberal Democrats	Greg Judge	145	4.27%	N/A
Socialist	Jim Donnelly	122	3.59%	+1.55%
Majority		72	2.19%	
Turnout		3398	25.65%	−10.35%
Labour gain from Conservative		Swing		

Whoberley Ward
Party	Candidate	Votes	%	±%
Labour	Jayne Elisabeth Innes	1693	49.37%	−1.08%
Conservative	Roger Maurice James Bailey	1014	29.57%	+2.15%
Green	Rachel Adshead	320	9.33%	+2.83%
Socialist	Richard Groves	206	6.01%	+3.86%
Liberal Democrats	Brian Rees Lewis	160	4.67%	−1.14%
Majority		679	19.80%	
Turnout		3429	27.34%	−13.57%
Labour gain from Conservative		Swing		

Woodlands Ward
Party	Candidate	Votes	%	±%
Labour	Steven Peter Thomas	1853	47.35%	+4.39%
Conservative	Heather Johnson	1534	39.20%	+2.14%
Green	Dan Gower	222	5.67%	+2.16%
Liberal Democrats	Jacqueline Bridget Basu	192	4.91%	−5.41%
Socialist	Sunara Begum	82	2.10%	+1.27%
Majority		319	8.15%	
Turnout		3913	29.36%	−11.54%
Labour gain from Conservative		Swing		

Wyken Ward
Party	Candidate	Votes	%	±%
Labour	Robert Richard Thay	1888	53.82%	+0.42%
Conservative	Susanna Dixon	1146	32.67%	−2.72%
Independent	Adrian Roll	203	5.79%	+1.57%
Green	Cathy Wattebot	160	4.56%	+0.05%
Socialist	Jodie Hannis	89	2.54%	+0.06%
Majority		742	21.15%	
Turnout		3508	26.65%	−11.95%
Labour gain from Conservative		Swing		
