= 2016 Coventry City Council election =

2016 UK local government election

Map of the results

The 2016 Coventry City Council election was scheduled and took place on 5 May 2016 to elect members of Coventry City Council in England. This was on the same day as other local elections.

== Current Council seats ==
The table below shows a summary of the make-up of the City Council before the 5 May 2016 elections.

| Party | Number of seats 2015–16 | Number of seats 2016–17 |
|---|---|---|
| Labour | 41 | 39 |
| Conservative | 13 | 15 |
| Total | 54 | 54 |

== Number of candidates by party ==
| Description of party (if any) | Number of candidates |
|---|---|
| Christian Movement for Great Britain | 1 |
| Conservative Party | 18 |
| Green Party | 18 |
| Labour Party | 18 |
| Liberal Democrat | 8 |
| Trade Unionist and Socialist Coalition | 18 |
| UK Independence Party (UKIP) | 8 |

== Election result in 2016 ==
Coventry local election result 2016
| Party | Seats | Gains | Losses | Net gain/loss | Seats % | Votes % | Votes | +/− |
|---|---|---|---|---|---|---|---|---|
| Labour | | | | | | | | |
| Green | | | | | | | | |
| Liberal Democrats | | | | | | | | |
| UKIP | | | | | | | | |
| Conservative | | | | | | | | |
| TUSC | | | | | | | | |
| Christian Movement for Great Britain | | | | | | | | |

== Ward results ==
=== Bablake ===
Bablake Ward
| Party | Candidate | Votes | % | ±% |
|---|---|---|---|---|
| TUSC | Dan CROWTER | 81 | | |
| Labour | Alan Thomas EAST | 1427 | | |
| UKIP | Tony MIDDLETON | 711 | | |
| Green | Walter William MILNER | 264 | | |
| Conservative | Glenn Michael WILLIAMS | 1579 | | |
| Majority | | | | |
| Turnout | | | 31.76% | |
| | | Swing | | |

=== Binley and Willenhall ===
Binley and Willenhall Ward
| Party | Candidate | Votes | % | ±% |
|---|---|---|---|---|
| Green | Dave FEETENBY | | | |
| TUSC | Terri-Jay HERSEY | | | |
| UKIP | Colin Aldous STUBBS | | | |
| Labour | Christine Elizabeth THOMAS | | | |
| Conservative | Sundeep Singh VIRK | | | |
| Majority | | | | |
| Turnout | | | | |
| | | Swing | | |

=== Cheylesmore ===
Cheylesmore Ward
| Party | Candidate | Votes | % | ±% |
|---|---|---|---|---|
| Labour | Rois ALI | | | |
| TUSC | Judy GRIFFITHS | | | |
| Green | Jonathan Howard IDLE | | | |
| Conservative | Mark Philip TAYLOR | | | |
| Majority | | | | |
| Turnout | | | | |
| | | Swing | | |

=== Earlsdon ===
Earlsdon Ward
| Party | Candidate | Votes | % | ±% |
|---|---|---|---|---|
| Conservative | Allan Robert ANDREWS | | | |
| Liberal Democrats | Jacqueline Bridget BASU | | | |
| TUSC | Kieran GANGARAM | | | |
| Green | Scott Gordon REDDING | | | |
| Labour | Dave TOULSON | | | |
| Majority | | | | |
| Turnout | | | | |
| | | Swing | | |

=== Foleshill ===
Foleshill Ward
| Party | Candidate | Votes | % | ±% |
|---|---|---|---|---|
| Labour | Balvinder DHANJAL | | | |
| TUSC | Simon EVANS | | | |
| Conservative | Bhagwant Singh PANDHER | | | |
| Green | David Neil PRIESTLEY | | | |
| Christian Movement for Great Britain | William SIDHU | | | |
| Majority | | | | |
| Turnout | | | | |
| | | Swing | | |

=== Henley ===
Henley Ward
| Party | Candidate | Votes | % | ±% |
|---|---|---|---|---|
| TUSC | Jamie EDGAR | | | |
| UKIP | Ian Arthur ROGERS | | | |
| Labour | Ed RUANE | | | |
| Conservative | Tessa Eveline Charlotte STEENKS | | | |
| Green | Cathy WATTEBOT | | | |
| Majority | | | | |
| Turnout | | | | |
| | | Swing | | |

=== Holbrook ===
Holbrook Ward
| Party | Candidate | Votes | % | ±% |
|---|---|---|---|---|
| Green | Paul David ANDREW | | | |
| UKIP | Satveer Singh BHAMRA | | | |
| Labour | Rachel Elizabeth LANCASTER | | | |
| Conservative | Deepak ROBINSON | | | |
| TUSC | Ryan ROCHESTER | | | |
| Majority | | | | |
| Turnout | | | | |
| | | Swing | | |

=== Longford ===
Longford Ward
| Party | Candidate | Votes | % | ±% |
|---|---|---|---|---|
| UKIP | Chantelle Louise COOMBES | | | |
| Labour | George Arthur DUGGINS | | | |
| Green | Merle Ross GERING | | | |
| Conservative | Tarlochan Singh JANDU | | | |
| TUSC | Jordan JEFFERIES | | | |
| Majority | | | | |
| Turnout | | | | |
| | | Swing | | |

=== Lower Stoke ===
Lower Stoke Ward
| Party | Candidate | Votes | % | ±% |
|---|---|---|---|---|
| Conservative | Michael Arthur BALLINGER | | | |
| Liberal Democrats | Christopher Mark GLENN | | | |
| TUSC | Rob MCARDLE | | | |
| Labour | Catherine Elizabeth MIKS | | | |
| Green | Esther Mary REEVES | | | |
| Majority | | | | |
| Turnout | | | | |
| | | Swing | | |

=== Radford ===
Radford Ward
| Party | Candidate | Votes | % | ±% |
|---|---|---|---|---|
| TUSC | Dave ANDERSON | | | |
| Green | Gavin Lee COLLINS | | | |
| Conservative | Asha MASIH | | | |
| Labour | Mal MUTTON | | | |
| Majority | | | | |
| Turnout | | | | |
| | | Swing | | |

=== Sherbourne ===
Sherbourne Ward
| Party | Candidate | Votes | % | ±% |
|---|---|---|---|---|
| UKIP | Matthew BATSON | | | |
| Green | Stephen Robert George GRAY | | | |
| TUSC | Jim HENSMAN | | | |
| Labour | Lynnette Catherine KELLY | | | |
| Liberal Democrats | Jim SIMPSON | | | |
| Conservative | Stefan SPALATELU | | | |
| Majority | | | | |
| Turnout | | | | |
| | | Swing | | |

=== St Michael's ===
St Michael's Ward
| Party | Candidate | Votes | % | ±% |
|---|---|---|---|---|
| Labour | Naeem AKHTAR | 2,122 | 66% | |
| Green | Aimee CHALLENOR | 178 | 6% | |
| TUSC | Dave NELLIST | 635 | 20% | |
| Conservative | Christopher Michael NOONAN | 274 | 9% | |
| Majority | | | | |
| Turnout | | | | |
| | | Swing | | |

=== Upper Stoke ===
Upper Stoke Ward
| Party | Candidate | Votes | % | ±% |
|---|---|---|---|---|
| Labour | Kamran Asif CAAN | | | |
| Liberal Democrats | Russell David FIELD | | | |
| UKIP | Marcus Luke Paris FOGDEN | | | |
| Conservative | Jagmohan SINGH | | | |
| TUSC | Paul SMITH | | | |
| Green | Laura Katherine VESTY | | | |
| Majority | | | | |
| Turnout | | | | |
| | | Swing | | |

=== Wainbody ===
Wainbody Ward
| Party | Candidate | Votes | % | ±% |
|---|---|---|---|---|
| Conservative | John Anthony BLUNDELL | | | |
| Labour | Abdul JOBBAR | | | |
| Liberal Democrats | Gilbert Napier PENLINGTON | | | |
| TUSC | Ian WARDLE | | | |
| Green | Niall WEBB | | | |
| Majority | | | | |
| Turnout | | | | |
| | | Swing | | |

=== Westwood ===
Westwood Ward
| Party | Candidate | Votes | % | ±% |
|---|---|---|---|---|
| Labour | Maya Ajijun ALI | | | |
| TUSC | Jim DONNELLY | | | |
| Green | Jess MARSHALL | | | |
| Conservative | Tim MAYER | | | |
| Majority | | | | |
| Turnout | | | | |
| | | Swing | | |

=== Whoberley ===
Whoberley Ward
| Party | Candidate | Votes | % | ±% |
|---|---|---|---|---|
| TUSC | Rich GROVES | | | |
| Labour | Jayne Elisabeth INNES | | | |
| Conservative | Steve KEOUGH | | | |
| Liberal Democrats | Brian Rees LEWIS | | | |
| Green | Anne PATTERSON | | | |
| Majority | | | | |
| Turnout | | | | |
| | | Swing | | |

=== Woodlands ===
Woodlands Ward
| Party | Candidate | Votes | % | ±% |
|---|---|---|---|---|
| Labour | Patricia Maria HETHERTON | | | |
| Liberal Democrats | Andy HILTON | | | |
| Conservative | Gary Christopher RIDLEY | | | |
| TUSC | Sarah SMITH | | | |
| Green | Joy Annette WARREN | | | |
| Majority | | | | |
| Turnout | | | | |
| | | Swing | | |

=== Wyken ===
Wyken Ward
| Party | Candidate | Votes | % | ±% |
|---|---|---|---|---|
| Liberal Democrats | Stuart Raymond COLES | | | |
| TUSC | Greg CRABB | | | |
| UKIP | Malcolm SCOTT | | | |
| Conservative | Myooran SRI | | | |
| Labour | Robert Richard THAY | | | |
| Green | Joe WILLIAMS | | | |
| Majority | | | | |
| Turnout | | | | |
| | | Swing | | |
