= 2018 Coventry City Council election =

2018 UK local government election

Map showing the results of the 2018 Coventry City Council election

The 2018 Coventry City Council election took place on 3 May 2018 to elect members of Coventry City Council in England. This was on the same day as other local elections.

== Current Council seats ==
The table below shows a summary of the make-up of the City Council before the 3 May 2018 elections.

Party	Number of seats 2016/17
Labour	39
Conservative	15
Total	54

== Number of candidates by party ==
Description of party (if any)	Number of candidates
Conservative Party	18
Green Party	18
Labour Party	18
Liberal Democrat	10
Trade Unionist and Socialist Coalition	5
UK Independence Party (UKIP)	8
Independent	2

== Election result in 2018 ==
Coventry local election result 2018
Party	Seats	Gains	Losses	Net gain/loss	Seats %	Votes %	Votes	+/−
Labour	13	1	0	▲1	72.2	52.8	33,334	
Conservative	5	0	1	▼1	27.8	32.9	20,784	
Green	0	0	0	Steady	0.0	6.5	4,133	
Liberal Democrats	0	0	0	Steady	0.0	3.2	2,020	
UKIP	0	0	0	Steady	0.0	2.4	1,545	
TUSC	0	0	0	Steady	0.0	1.2	795	
Independent	0	0	0	Steady	0.0	0.7	500	

== Ward results ==
The following tables show candidates for each Ward.

=== Bablake ===
Bablake Ward
Party	Candidate	Votes	%	±%
Conservative	Jaswant Singh BIRDI	2,048	40.0	
Labour	Penelope BARBER	1507	29.5	
Green	Scott Gordon REDDING	1187	23.2	
UKIP	Tony MIDDLETON	228	4.5	
Liberal Democrats	Peter SIMPSON	147	2.9	
Majority				
Turnout				
Conservative hold		Swing		

=== Binley and Willenhall ===
Binley and Willenhall Ward
Party	Candidate	Votes	%	±%
Labour	John Roderick MUTTON	1,574	50.8	
Conservative	Mattie HEAVEN	911	29.9	
UKIP	Paul Nicholas COWLEY	293	9.6	
Liberal Democrats	Nigel Peter PLOWMAN	146	4.8	
Green	Tina Michele CHALLENOR	123	4.0	
Majority				
Turnout				
Labour hold		Swing		

=== Cheylesmore ===
Cheylesmore Ward
Party	Candidate	Votes	%	±%
Conservative	Roger Maurice James BAILEY	1,815	45.6	
Labour	Maya Ajijun ALI	1743	43.8	
Liberal Democrats	Anna Margaret RICHMOND	214	5.4	
Green	George TTOOULI	205	5.2	
Majority				
Turnout				
Conservative hold		Swing		

=== Earlsdon ===
Earlsdon Ward
Party	Candidate	Votes	%	±%
Labour	Kindy SANDHU	2,375	45.9	
Conservative	Michael Arthur BALLINGER	2219	42.9	
Liberal Democrats	Stephen John RICHMOND	322	6.2	
Green	Cathy WATTEBOT	260	5.0	
Majority				
Turnout				
Labour gain from Conservative		Swing		

=== Foleshill ===
Foleshill Ward
Party	Candidate	Votes	%	±%
Labour	Tariq KHAN	2,830	83.3	
Conservative	William SIDHU	314	9.2	
Green	David Neil PRIESTLEY	148	4.4	
UKIP	Jennifer Clare WELLS	107	3.1	
Majority				
Turnout				
Labour hold		Swing		

=== Henley ===
Henley Ward
Party	Candidate	Votes	%	±%
Labour	Kevin Barry MATON	1,709	54.7	
Conservative	Oliver David GRAHAM	896	28.7	
UKIP	Martin Joseph BATES	232	7.4	
Green	Matthew HANDLEY	228	7.3	
TUSC	Michael MORGAN	60	1.9	
Majority				
Turnout				
Labour hold		Swing		

=== Holbrook ===
Holbrook Ward
Party	Candidate	Votes	%	±%
Labour	Evelyn Ann LUCAS	1,839	58.2	
Conservative	Tarlochan Singh JANDU	617	19.5	
Green	Stephen GRAY	549	17.4	
UKIP	Marcus Luke Paris FOGEN	155	4.9	
Majority				
Turnout				
Labour hold		Swing		

=== Longford ===
Longford Ward
Party	Candidate	Votes	%	±%
Labour	Lindsley HARVARD	2,222	69.6	
Conservative	Amarjit Singh KHANGURA	715	22.4	
Green	Katie SMITH	256	8.0	
Majority				
Turnout				
Labour hold		Swing		

=== Lower Stoke ===
Lower Stoke Ward
Party	Candidate	Votes	%	±%
Labour	Rupinder SINGH	2,206	58.7	
Conservative	Christopher Michael NOONAN	760	20.2	
UKIP	Ivor Harold DAVIES	263	7.0	
Green	Esther Mary REEVES	214	5.7	
Liberal Democrats	Andre Escorcio Rodrigues SOARES	184	4.9	
TUSC	Rob MCARDLE	131	3.5	
Majority				
Turnout				
Labour hold		Swing		

=== Radford ===
Radford Ward
Party	Candidate	Votes	%	±%
Labour	Patricia Maria HETHERTON	1,951	65.0	
Conservative	Maureen LAPSA	561	18.7	
Green	Julie SPRIDDLE	169	5.6	
TUSC	Dave ANDERSON	163	5.4	
UKIP	Ian Arthur ROGERS	158	5.3	
Majority				
Turnout				
Labour hold		Swing		

=== Sherbourne ===
Sherbourne Ward
Party	Candidate	Votes	%	±%
Labour	Seamus WALSH	1,460	44.3	
Conservative	Zaid REHMAN	959	29.1	
Independent	Matthew BATSON	307	9.3	
Green	Niall WEBB	285	8.6	
Independent	Merle Ross GERING	193	5.9	
TUSC	Isla Nell Edwina WINDSOR	91	2.8	
Majority				
Turnout				
Labour hold		Swing		

=== St Michael's ===
St Michael's Ward
Party	Candidate	Votes	%	±%
Labour	David Stuart WELSH	1,952	71.7	
TUSC	Dave NELLIST	350	12.9	
Conservative	Mark Andrew LERIGO	275	10.1	
Green	Aimee CHALLENOR	146	5.4	
Majority				
Turnout				
Labour hold		Swing		

=== Upper Stoke ===
Upper Stoke Ward
Party	Candidate	Votes	%	±%
Labour	Sucha Singh BAINS	1,967	61.2	
Conservative	Surinder Jit SINGH	775	24.1	
Green	Laura VESTY	268	8.3	
Liberal Democrats	Nukey PROCTOR	204	6.3	
Majority				
Turnout				
Labour hold		Swing		

=== Wainbody ===
Wainbody Ward
Party	Candidate	Votes	%	±%
Conservative	Gary Edward CROOKES	1,867	51.4	
Labour	Abdul JOBBAR	1271	35.0	
Liberal Democrats	James Frederick MORSHEAD	204	5.6	
Green	Joe MCAVOY-BOSS	182	5.0	
UKIP	George Charles Alfie IRELAND	109	3.0	
Majority				
Turnout				
Conservative hold		Swing		

=== Westwood ===
Westwood Ward
Party	Candidate	Votes	%	±%
Conservative	David John SKINNER	1,729	50.4	
Labour	Dave TOULSON	1429	41.7	
Green	Jess MARSHALL	169	4.9	
Liberal Democrats	Greg JUDGE	103	3.0	
Majority				
Turnout				
Conservative hold		Swing		

=== Whoberley ===
Whoberley Ward
Party	Candidate	Votes	%	±%
Labour	Bally SINGH	2,140	61.3	
Conservative	Steve KEOUGH	923	26.4	
Green	Anne PATTERSON	241	6.9	
Liberal Democrats	Rob WHEWAY	188	5.4	
Majority				
Turnout				
Labour hold		Swing		

=== Woodlands ===
Woodlands Ward
Party	Candidate	Votes	%	±%
Conservative	Julia Elizabeth LEPOIDEVIN	2,266	56.0	
Labour	Gavin John LLOYD	1267	31.3	
Liberal Democrats	Andy HILTON	308	7.6	
Green	Joy Annette WARREN	209	5.2	
Majority				
Turnout				
Conservative hold		Swing		

=== Wyken ===
Wyken Ward
Party	Candidate	Votes	%	±%
Labour	Faye ABBOTT	1,892	57.0	
Conservative	Asha MASIH	1134	34.2	
Green	Chrissie BROWN	294	8.9	
Majority				
Turnout				
Labour hold		Swing		
