= 2019 Coventry City Council election =

2019 UK local government election

Map of the results

The 2019 Coventry City Council election was held on 2 May 2019 to elect members of Coventry City Council in England. This was on the same day as other local elections.

== Current Council seats ==
The table below shows a summary of the make-up of the City Council before the 2 May 2019 elections.

Party	Number of seats 2016/17
Labour	40
Conservative	13
Independent	1
Total	54

== Key dates ==
- 3 April 2019 4pm: Deadline for those interested in standing as a candidate
- 12 April 2019: Deadline for new applications to register in time to vote
- 15 April 2019 5pm: Deadline for submitting applications to vote by post
- 24 April 2019 5pm: Deadline for submitting applications to vote by proxy

All electors who are currently registered and are eligible to vote on Thursday 2 May should receive their polling card by 7 April.

== Number of candidates by party ==
Description of party (if any)	Number of candidates
Conservative Party	
Green Party	
Labour Party	
Liberal Democrat	
Trade Unionist and Socialist Coalition	
UK Independence Party (UKIP)	
Independent	

== Election result in 2019 ==
Coventry local election result 2019
Party	Seats	Gains	Losses	Net gain/loss	Seats %	Votes %	Votes	+/−
Labour	40	1	1	0		45.67	28056	
Conservative	13	1	1	0		26.88	16512	
Green	0					11.92	7325	
UKIP	0					11.74	7214	
Liberal Democrats	0					1.91	1176	
TUSC	0					1	623	
Independent	1	0	0	0		0.82	503	

== Ward results ==
=== Bablake ===
Bablake
Party	Candidate	Votes	%	±%
Conservative	Tarlochan Jandu	1,535	39.7	
Labour Co-op	Angela Hopkins	1,147	29.7	
UKIP	Tony Middleton	644	16.7	
Green	David Priestley	536	13.9	
Majority				
Turnout		3,862		
Conservative gain from Labour		Swing		

=== Binley and Willenhall ===
Binley and Willenhall
Party	Candidate	Votes	%	±%
Labour	Ram Lakha	1,417	45.9	
UKIP	Paul Cowley	847	27.5	
Conservative	Derek Andrews	553	17.9	
Green	Danney Foulstone	267	8.7	
Majority				
Turnout		3,084		
Labour hold		Swing		

=== Cheylesmore ===
Cheylesmore
Party	Candidate	Votes	%	±%
Labour	Richard Brown	1,492	43.5	
Conservative	Zaid Rehman	1,208	35.3	
Green	John Verdult	472	13.8	
Liberal Democrats	Jim McClean	254	7.4	
Majority				
Turnout		3,426		
Labour hold		Swing		

=== Earlsdon ===
Earlsdon
Party	Candidate	Votes	%	±%
Labour Co-op	Becky Gittins	2,155	42.0	
Conservative	Kenneth Taylor	2,051	39.9	
Green	John Finlayson	535	10.4	
Liberal Democrats	Stephen Richmond	394	7.7	
Majority				
Turnout		5,135		
Labour Co-op gain from Conservative		Swing		

=== Foleshill ===
Foleshill
Party	Candidate	Votes	%	±%
Labour	Abdul Khan	2,516	76.1	
Conservative	Raja Meesala	498	15.1	
Green	Cathy Wattebot	293	8.9	
Majority				
Turnout		3,307		
Labour hold		Swing		

=== Henley ===
Henley
Party	Candidate	Votes	%	±%
Labour	Patricia Seaman	1,586	50.3	
UKIP	Ian Rogers	593	18.8	
Conservative	William Sidhu	514	16.3	
Green	Matthew Handley	293	9.3	
Independent	Eamonn Mahon	169	5.4	
Majority				
Turnout		3,155		
Labour hold		Swing		

=== Holbrook ===
Holbrook
Party	Candidate	Votes	%	±%
Labour	Joe Clifford	1,598	50.3	
Green	Stephen Gray	642	20.2	
Conservative	Amarhit Khangura	488	15.4	
UKIP	Ian Alcock	448	14.1	
Majority				
Turnout		3,176		
Labour hold		Swing		

=== Longford ===
Longford
Party	Candidate	Votes	%	±%
Labour	Linda Bigham	1,874	57.7	
UKIP	Marcus Fogden	452	13.9	
Conservative	Laura Ridley	379	11.7	
Independent	Jim Bench	334	10.3	
Green	Cristian Honeychurch	211	6.5	
Majority				
Turnout		3,250		
Labour hold		Swing		

=== Lower Stoke ===
Lower Stoke
Party	Candidate	Votes	%	±%
Labour Co-op	John McNicholas	2,008	55.0	
UKIP	Ivor Davies	564	15.4	
Green	Esther Reeves	498	13.6	
Conservative	Zeeshan Qazi	465	12.7	
Socialist	Terri Hersey	118	3.2	
Majority				
Turnout		3,653		
Labour Co-op hold		Swing		

=== Radford ===
Radford
Party	Candidate	Votes	%	±%
Labour	Maya Ali	1,581	54.4	
UKIP	James Stubbs	497	17.1	
Conservative	Neil Worwood	418	14.4	
Green	Jules Spriddle	302	10.4	
Socialist	Isla Boadle	109	3.7	
Majority				
Turnout		2,907		
Labour hold		Swing		

=== Sherbourne ===
Sherbourne
Party	Candidate	Votes	%	±%
Labour	Gavin Lloyd	1,172	34.7	
Conservative	Mattie Heaven	1,115	33.0	
UKIP	Glyn Davies	484	14.3	
Green	Niall Webb	388	11.5	
Liberal Democrats	Nukey Proctor	216	6.4	
Majority				
Turnout		3,375		
Labour hold		Swing		

=== St. Michael's ===
St. Michael's
Party	Candidate	Votes	%	±%
Labour	Jim O'Boyle	1,765	68.5	
Socialist	Dave Nellist	396	15.4	
Conservative	Mary Taylor	224	8.7	
Green	Joe McAvoy-Boss	190	7.4	
Majority				
Turnout		2,575		
Labour hold		Swing		

=== Upper Stoke ===
Upper Stoke
Party	Candidate	Votes	%	±%
Labour	Randhir Auluck	1,538	50.4	
Conservative	Surinder Singh	621	20.3	
UKIP	George Ireland	501	16.4	
Green	Laura Vesty	394	12.9	
Majority				
Turnout		3,054		
Labour hold		Swing		

=== Wainbody ===
Wainbody
Party	Candidate	Votes	%	±%
Conservative	Tim Sawdon	1,666	47.8	
Labour	Abdul Jobbar	919	26.4	
Green	Becky Finlayson	381	10.9	
Liberal Democrats	James Morshead	312	9.0	
UKIP	Joshua Gregory-Salter	207	5.9	
Majority				
Turnout		3,485		
Conservative hold		Swing		

=== Westwood ===
Westwood
Party	Candidate	Votes	%	±%
Conservative	Marcus Lapsa	1,429	41.1	
Labour	Dave Toulson	1,128	32.5	
UKIP	Stephen Arnold	490	14.1	
Green	Jess Marshall	429	12.3	
Majority				
Turnout		3,476		
Conservative hold		Swing		

=== Whoberley ===
Whoberley
Party	Candidate	Votes	%	±%
Labour	Pervez Akhtar	1,577	45.3	
Conservative	Steve Keough	729	20.9	
Green	Anne Patterson	727	20.9	
UKIP	Kate Harper	451	12.9	
Majority				
Turnout		3,484		
Labour hold		Swing		

=== Woodlands ===
Woodlands
Party	Candidate	Votes	%	±%
Conservative	Peter Male	1,854	48.1	
Labour	Nobby Clarke	1,158	30.0	
UKIP	Bradley Alcock	463	12.0	
Green	Sudhir Sard	382	9.9	
Majority				
Turnout		3,857		
Conservative hold		Swing		

=== Wyken ===
Wyken
Party	Candidate	Votes	%	±%
Labour	Hazel Sweet	1,425	45.3	
Conservative	Asha Masih	765	24.3	
UKIP	Michelle Reid	573	18.2	
Green	Chrissie Brown	385	12.2	
Majority				
Turnout		3,148		
Labour hold		Swing		

== Changes 2019–2021 ==
=== By-elections ===
==== Wainbody ====
The Wainbody by-election was triggered by the death of councillor Gary Crookes.

Wainbody: 5 September 2019
Party	Candidate	Votes	%	
Conservative	Mattie Heaven	1,560	53.2	▲1.8
Liberal Democrats	James Morshead	634	21.6	▲16.0
Labour	Abdul Jobbar	544	18.6	▼16.4
Brexit	George Beamish	193	6.6	
Majority		926	31.6	
Turnout		2948		
Conservative hold		Swing		

==== Upper Stoke ====
The Upper Stoke by-election was triggered by the death of Labour councillor Sucha Singh Bains.

Upper Stoke: 19 March 2020
Party	Candidate	Votes	%	
Labour	Gurdev Singh Hayre	639	52.8	▲2.4
Conservative	Gurdeep Singh Sohal	350	28.9	▲8.6
Green	Chrissie Lynn Brown	120	9.9	▼3.0
Socialist Alternative	Jane Elizabeth Nellist	101	8.3	N/A
Majority		289	23.9	▼6.1
Turnout		1214		
Labour hold		Swing		
