= Alison Gingell =

Alison Gingell was the chair of the Coventry Primary Care Trust from 2002 until 2013. She was also a Labour councillor in Coventry from 2012 until 2016.

== Career ==
After graduation, Gingell worked for the British Pregnancy Advisory Service in Coventry and then in health education.

In 1979 she became a magistrate and was also a school governor.

She chaired the Coventry Primary Care Trust from 2002 until 2013, having previously been the vice-chair between 1995 and 2002. This administrative body within the National Health Service was responsible for commissioning all the primary, community and secondary health services within the Coventry and Warwickshire region. Her special interests were the rights and health of women and children. She was appointed to a Department of Health and Social Care strategy group in recognition of her achievements, including development of Coventry's new hospital.

In 2012 she was elected to Coventry City Council as a Labour Party councillor for Sherbourne ward, having previously stood unsuccessfully as a candidate in Cheylesmore ward. She held the portfolio for health and adult services from May 2013 until May 2015. As part of the latter she led the city's information campaign against female genital mutilation from 2014.

For almost 30 years, Gingell was the proprietor of a shop in central Coventry called Woman at Large that opened in the late 1980s.

== Personal life ==
Alison Jane Gingell was the third of her parents' nine children. She lived in Ely, Cambridgeshire as a child and attended Ely High School for Girls. She was the first in her family to go to university and moved to Coventry in 1969 to attend University of Warwick. She married Bob Gingell while she was still a student and they had two children.

She died on 17 April 2016, some time after having a diagnosis of motor neurone disease.

== Legacy ==
The Alison Gingell Building at Coventry University, for the study of science and health, was named after her in June 2016.
