= 1999 Coventry City Council election =

1999 UK local government election

The 1999 Coventry City Council election to the Coventry City Council was held on Thursday 6 May 1999. The Labour Party retained overall control of the council.
