= 2003 Coventry City Council election =

2003 UK local government election

Elections to Coventry City Council in England were held on 1 May 2003. Nineteen seats were up for election – the usual one third of the council, plus an additional seat in Whoberley ward, which was vacant. Labour lost majority control of the council, but remained the largest party.

== Election results ==
Coventry local election result 2003
Party	Seats	Gains	Losses	Net gain/loss	Seats %	Votes %	Votes	+/−
Labour	8	0	5	-5				
Conservative	9	4	0	+4				
Socialist Alternative	1	0	0	0				
Liberal Democrats	1	1	0	+1				
BNP	0	0	0	0				
Independent	0	0	0	0				
Other	0	0	0	0	0.00			

== Council Composition ==
The composition of the council before and after the election can be found in the following table:

Party	Previous council	Staying councillors	Seats up for election	Election result	New council
Labour	31	18	13	8	26
Conservative	19	14	5	9	23
Socialist Alternative	3	2	1	1	3
Liberal Democrats	1	1	0	1	2
BNP	0	0	0	0	0
Independent	0	0	0	0	0
Other	0	0	0	0	0
Total	54	36	18	18	54

== Ward results ==
Bablake ward
Party	Candidate	Votes	%	±%
Conservative	Brian Kelsey	2,139		
Labour	Gordon Arthur Wright	1,011		
Liberal Democrats	Gilbert Napier Penlington	713		
Majority				
Turnout				
Conservative hold		Swing		

Binley and Willenhall ward
Party	Candidate	Votes	%	±%
Labour	Ram Parkash Lakha	1,386		
Conservative	Heather Jean Johnson	1,247		
Independent	Brian Anthony McCarney	486		
Socialist Alternative	Samantha Elizabeth Ashby	230		
Majority				
Turnout				
Labour hold		Swing		

Cheylesmore ward
Party	Candidate	Votes	%	±%
Conservative	Linda Ann Reece	1,840		
Labour	Raymond Stewart Byers	1041		
Liberal Democrats	Vincent McKee	563		
Majority				
Turnout				
Conservative gain from Labour		Swing		

Earlsdon ward
Party	Candidate	Votes	%	±%
Conservative	Andrew MacDonald Matchet	2,166		
Labour	Lindsley Harvard	1,366		
Liberal Democrats	Adrian Edward Dyke	822		
Socialist Alternative	Anthony Paul Smith	223		
Majority				
Turnout				
Conservative hold		Swing		

Foleshill ward
Party	Candidate	Votes	%	±%
Labour	Heather Ann Parker	1,679		
Conservative	Shabbir Ahmed	819		
Socialist Alternative	Lakshman Hensman	348		
Majority				
Turnout				
Labour hold		Swing		

Henley ward
Party	Candidate	Votes	%	±%
Labour	Thomas Patrick Ruddy	1,228		
Conservative	Jean Margaret Tandy	778		
Liberal Democrats	Mandeep Singh Jandu	302		
Socialist Alternative	Martha Elsie Beatrice Young	262		
Majority				
Turnout				
Labour hold		Swing		

Holbrook ward
Party	Candidate	Votes	%	±%
Labour	Joseph Clifford	1,569		
Conservative	Harjinder Sehmi	775		
Liberal Democrats	Christine Nuala Coupe	701		
Majority				
Turnout				
Labour hold		Swing		

Longford ward
Party	Candidate	Votes	%	±%
Labour	George Arthur Duggins	1,561		
Conservative	Harry Maeers	777		
Liberal Democrats	Geoffrey Brian Sewards	515		
Majority				
Turnout				
Labour hold		Swing		

Lower Stoke ward
Party	Candidate	Votes	%	±%
Labour	Philip David Townshend	1,171		
Conservative	Margaret Veronica Rigby	957		
Liberal Democrats	Conrad Benefield	465		
Socialist Alternative	Jane Ashwell	345		
Majority				
Turnout				
Labour hold		Swing		

Radford ward
Party	Candidate	Votes	%	±%
Labour	Anthony Charles Skipper	1,262		
Liberal Democrats	Peter Simpson	712		
Conservative	Ronald John Carr	605		
Marxist	David Anderson	134		
Majority				
Turnout				
Labour hold		Swing		

Sherbourne ward
Party	Candidate	Votes	%	±%
Conservative	Heather Rutter	1,394		
Labour	Howard Peter Lacy	1,186		
Liberal Democrats	William George Haymes	681		
Majority				
Turnout				
Conservative gain from Labour		Swing		

St Michael's ward
Party	Candidate	Votes	%	±%
Socialist Alternative	Karen McKay	1,185		
Labour	James Matthew O'Boyle	1,005		
Conservative	Marc Cedric Howson	270		
Majority				
Turnout				
Socialist Alternative hold		Swing		

Upper Stoke ward
Party	Candidate	Votes	%	±%
Liberal Democrats	Russell Field	2,201		
Labour	David Henry Edwards	1,294		
Conservative	Hazel Ann Reece	244		
Majority				
Turnout				
Liberal Democrats gain from Labour		Swing		

Wainbody ward
Party	Candidate	Votes	%	±%
Conservative	Gary Edward Crookes	2,194		
Labour	Christopher Nicholas Youett	800		
Liberal Democrats	Francis Peter Lockett	957		
Majority				
Turnout				
Conservative hold		Swing		

Westwood ward
Party	Candidate	Votes	%	±%
Labour	David Henry Batten	1,304		
Conservative	Nigel Charles Lee	1,086		
Independent	James Richard Donnelly	251		
Socialist Alternative	James Richard Donnelly	218		
Majority				
Turnout				
Labour hold		Swing		

Whoberley ward
Party	Candidate	Votes	%	±%
Conservative	Joan Ann Griffin	1,497		
Conservative	Clifford Leonard Ridge	1,383		
Labour	Kevin Barry Maton	1,043		
Labour	John French	1,000		
Liberal Democrats	Arthur Hugh Thomas	734		
Liberal Democrats	Jacqueline Bridget Basu	712		
Socialist Alternative	Michael Jeffrey Holton	268		
Socialist Alternative	Mark Edward Power	253		
Majority				
Turnout				
Conservative gain from Labour		Swing		
Conservative hold		Swing		

Woodlands ward
Party	Candidate	Votes	%	±%
Conservative	Diana Margaret Tuson	1,827		
Labour	Jean Jackson	1,276		
BNP	Mark Andrew Payne	1,013		
Liberal Democrats	Stephen Howarth	811		
Majority				
Turnout				
Conservative hold		Swing		

Wyken ward
Party	Candidate	Votes	%	±%
Conservative	Susanna Ella Dixon	1,594		
Labour	Marilyn Ann Mutton	1,334		
Liberal Democrats	Brian Rees Lewis	794		
Majority				
Turnout				
Conservative gain from Labour		Swing		
