= 2000 Coventry City Council election =

2000 UK local government election

Elections to Coventry City Council were held on Thursday May 4, 2000. The Labour Party kept overall control of the council.
