= 2002 Coventry City Council election =

2002 UK local government election

The 2002 Coventry City Council election to the Coventry City Council was held on 3 May 2002. One third of the council was up for election and the Labour Party retained overall control of the council.

== Election results ==
Coventry local election result 2002
Party	Seats	Gains	Losses	Net gain/loss	Seats %	Votes %	Votes	+/−
Labour	11	0	4	-4				
Conservative	6	4	0	+4				
Socialist	1	0	0	0				
Liberal Democrats	0	0	0	0				
Independent	0	0	0	0				
Others	0	0	0	0	0.00			

== Council Composition ==
The composition of the council before and after the election can be found in the following table:

Party	Previous council	Staying councillors	Seats up for election	Election result	New council
Labour	35	20	15	11	31
Conservative	15	13	2	6	19
Socialist	3	2	1	1	3
Liberal Democrats	1	1	0	0	1
Independent	0	0	0	0	0
Other	0	0	0	0	0
Total	54	36	18	18	54

== Ward results ==
Bablake ward
Party	Candidate	Votes	%	±%
Conservative	John Gazey	2,349	57.53%	
Labour	Beverley Patton	1,205	29.51%	
Liberal Democrats	Gilbert Penlington	529	12.96%	
Majority		1144	28.02%	
Turnout		4083		
Conservative hold		Swing		

Binley and Willenhall ward
Party	Candidate	Votes	%	±%
Labour	David Chater	1,834	52.00%	
Conservative	Linda Reece	1,400	39.69%	
Socialist	Rebecca Tustain	293	8.31%	
Majority		434	12.31%	
Turnout		3257		
Labour hold		Swing		

Cheylesmore ward
Party	Candidate	Votes	%	±%
Conservative	Kevin Foster	1,666	52.00%	
Labour	Marilyn Mutton	1,245	38.86%	
Liberal Democrats	Vincent McKee	501	15.64%	
Majority		421	13.14%	
Turnout		3204		
Conservative gain from Labour		Swing		

Earlsdon ward
Party	Candidate	Votes	%	±%
Conservative	Kenneth Taylor	2,479	50.44%	
Labour	Lindsley Harvard	1,528	31.09%	
Liberal Democrats	Adrian Dyke	659	13.41%	
Socialist	Pearl Chick	249	5.07%	
Majority		951	19.35%	
Turnout		4915		
Conservative hold		Swing		

Foleshill ward
Party	Candidate	Votes	%	±%
Labour	Malkiat Auluck	2,010		
Conservative	Shabbir Ahmed	1,617		
Socialist	Lakshman Hensman	213		
Majority				
Turnout				
Labour hold		Swing		

Henley ward
Party	Candidate	Votes	%	±%
Labour	Brian Patton	1,387		
Conservative	Ian Jamie	890		
Socialist	Martha Young	381		
Majority				
Turnout				
Labour hold		Swing		

Holbrook ward
Party	Candidate	Votes	%	±%
Labour	Margaret Lancaster	2,017		
Conservative	Harjinder Sehmi	1,028		
Majority				
Turnout				
Labour hold		Swing		

Longford ward
Party	Candidate	Votes	%	±%
Labour	Sheila Collins	1,664		
Conservative	Heather Rutter	764		
Liberal Democrats	Geoffrey Sewards	341		
Socialist	Martin Reynolds	243		
Majority				
Turnout				
Labour hold		Swing		

Lower Stoke ward
Party	Candidate	Votes	%	±%
Labour	John McNicholas	1,394		
Conservative	Margaret Rigby	988		
Socialist	Jane Ashwell	397		
Liberal Democrats	Conrad Benefield	337		
Majority				
Turnout				
Labour hold		Swing		

Radford ward
Party	Candidate	Votes	%	±%
Labour	Keiran Mulhall	1,347		
Liberal Democrats	Peter Simpson	609		
Conservative	David Chapman	545		
Marxist	David Anderson	131		
Majority				
Turnout				
Labour hold		Swing		

Sherbourne ward
Party	Candidate	Votes	%	±%
Conservative	Gary Ridley	1,354		
Labour	Eric Linton	1,293		
Liberal Democrats	Brian Lewis	584		
Majority				
Turnout				
Conservative gain from Labour		Swing		

St Michael's ward
Party	Candidate	Votes	%	±%
Socialist	David Nellist	1,417		
Labour	James O'Boyle	1,022		
Conservative	Jane Westerman	237		
Majority				
Turnout				
Socialist hold		Swing		

Upper Stoke ward
Party	Candidate	Votes	%	±%
Labour	Sucha Bains	1,666		
Liberal Democrats	Russell Field	1,655		
Conservative	James Griffin	306		
Majority		11		
Turnout				
Labour hold		Swing		

Wainbody ward
Party	Candidate	Votes	%	±%
Conservative	John Blundell	2,163		
Labour	Christopher Youett	961		
Liberal Democrats	Francis Lockett	765		
Majority				
Turnout				
Conservative hold		Swing		

Westwood ward
Party	Candidate	Votes	%	±%
Labour	Arthur Waugh	1,281		
Conservative	Nigel Lee	1,098		
Socialist	Mary Manley	364		
Majority				
Turnout				
Labour hold		Swing		

Whoberley ward
Party	Candidate	Votes	%	±%
Conservative	John Hillier	1,685		
Labour	John Fletcher	1,580		
Socialist	Mark Power	450		
Majority				
Turnout				
Conservative gain from Labour		Swing		

Woodlands ward
Party	Candidate	Votes	%	±%
Conservative	Christian Cliffe	2,168		
Labour	Joseph Clifford	1,653		
Liberal Democrats	Stephen Howarth	705		
Majority				
Turnout				
Conservative gain from Labour		Swing		

Wyken ward
Party	Candidate	Votes	%	±%
Conservative	Suzanna Dixon	1,373		
Labour	Colleen Fletcher	1,521		
Liberal Democrats	Wiliam Haymes	619		
Majority				
Turnout				
Labour hold		Swing		
