= 2004 Coventry City Council election =

2004 UK local government election

Map of the results of the 2004 Coventry council election. Conservatives in blue, Labour in dark red, Liberal Democrats in yellow and Socialist Alternative in light red.

Elections to Coventry City Council were held in June 2004. Due to boundary changes, the entire council was up for election. The council remained with no overall control, but the Conservatives became the largest party.

After the election, the composition of the council was

- Conservative 27
- Labour 22
- Liberal Democrat 3
- Socialist Alternative 2

== Election result ==
Coventry local election result 2008
Party	Seats	Gains	Losses	Net gain/loss	Seats %	Votes %	Votes	+/−
Conservative	27	4	1	+4	50.00			
Labour	22	2	4	-2	40.74			
Liberal Democrats	3	1	0	+1	5.56			
Socialist Alternative	2	0	1	-1	3.70			
BNP	0	0	0	0	0.00			
Independent	0	0	-2	-2	0.00			

== Ward results ==
Note that seat gains and losses are compared with the previous seat of the same name. All eighteen seats had redrawn boundaries.

Bablake ward
Party	Candidate	Votes	%	±%
Conservative	John Victor Gazey	3,035		
Conservative	Brian Kelsey	2,522		
Conservative	Andrew John Williams	2,359		
Labour	William Shakespeare	1,470		
Labour	Pamela June Darville	1,326		
Labour	Gordon Arthur Wright	1,184		
Liberal Democrats	Kevin John Weaver	974		
Majority				
Turnout				
Conservative hold		Swing		
Conservative hold		Swing		
Conservative hold		Swing		

Binley and Willenhall ward
Party	Candidate	Votes	%	±%
Labour	David Chater	1,722		
Labour	Ram Parkesh Lakha	1,647		
Labour	John Roderick Mutton	1,639		
Conservative	Joseph Andrew Featherstone	1,399		
Conservative	Graham Richard Williams	1,332		
Conservative	Mimi Francesca Hwangpo	1,159		
Independent	Craig Deniro	845		
Liberal Democrats	David Richard Farren	784		
Socialist Alternative	David Bryan Runnalls	423		
Majority				
Turnout				
Labour hold		Swing		
Labour hold		Swing		
Labour hold		Swing		

Cheylesmore ward
Party	Candidate	Votes	%	±%
Conservative	Kevin John Foster	2,284		
Conservative	Hazel Margaret Noonan	2,395		
Conservative	Linda Ann Reece	2,230		
Labour	John Boynton	1,530		
Labour	Helen Elizabeth Sinclair	1,385		
Labour	Rois Ali	1,323		
Liberal Democrats	Terence Kenny	1,084		
Independent	Irene Elizabeth Rogers	673		
Majority				
Turnout				
Conservative hold		Swing		
Conservative hold		Swing		
Conservative hold		Swing		

Earlsdon ward
Party	Candidate	Votes	%	±%
Conservative	Catherine Harper	2,789		
Conservative	Andrew McDonald Matchet	2,598		
Conservative	Kenneth John Taylor	2,657		
Labour	Kathleen Mary Fletcher	1,782		
Labour	Peter Francis Davis	1,724		
Labour	Baljinder Singh	1,341		
Liberal Democrats	Vincent John McKee	1,193		
Independent	Paul Anthony Smith	703		
Majority				
Turnout				
Conservative hold		Swing		
Conservative hold		Swing		
Conservative hold		Swing		

Foleshill ward
Party	Candidate	Votes	%	±%
Conservative	Shabbir Ahmed	2,171		
Conservative	Mohammed Asif	2,155		
Labour	Malkiat Singh Auluck	1,923		
Labour	Satnam Singh Gill	1,899		
Conservative	Harjinder Singh Sehmi	1,876		
Labour	Marilyn Ann (Mal) Mutton	1,856		
Liberal Democrats	Geoffrey Brian Sewards	516		
Socialist Alternative	Lakshman James Hensman	332		
Majority				
Turnout				
Conservative gain from Labour		Swing		
Conservative gain from Labour		Swing		
Labour hold		Swing		

Henley ward
Party	Candidate	Votes	%	±%
Labour	Brian David Patton	1,643		
Labour	Lynnette Catherine Kelly	1,431		
Labour	Thomas Patrick Ruddy	1,380		
Conservative	Jean Margaret Tandy	1,323		
Conservative	Avril Rosemary Johnson	1,262		
Conservative	Mary Winifred Lee	1,222		
Liberal Democrats	Mandeep Singh Jandu	715		
Socialist Alternative	Paul David Hunt	527		
Majority				
Turnout				
Labour hold		Swing		
Labour hold		Swing		
Labour hold		Swing		

Holbrook ward
Party	Candidate	Votes	%	±%
Labour	Margaret Lancaster	1,727		
Labour	Joseph Clifford	1,652		
Labour	Evelyn Ann (Ann) Lucas	1,626		
Conservative	Scot Kereck Hatfield	992		
Conservative	Gareth David Peters	957		
Conservative	Amrit Pal Kaur Singh	881		
Liberal Democrats	Dennis Herbert Jeffrey	794		
Liberal Democrats	David Michael Field	793		
Liberal Democrats	Alice Rachel Turner	693		
Socialist Alternative	Michael Jeffrey Holton	284		
Majority				
Turnout				
Labour hold		Swing		
Labour hold		Swing		
Labour hold		Swing		

Longford ward
Party	Candidate	Votes	%	±%
Labour	George Arthur Duggins	2,052		
Labour	Linda Joyce Bigham	2,041		
Labour	Jill Valerie (Val) Stone	1,881		
Conservative	Allan Robert Andrews	1,226		
Conservative	Harry Maeers	1,090		
Conservative	Ian Thomas Jamie	1,070		
Liberal Democrats	Derek Arthur Franklin	831		
Majority				
Turnout				
Labour hold		Swing		
Labour hold		Swing		
Labour gain from		Swing		

Lower Stoke ward
Party	Candidate	Votes	%	±%
Labour	Jack Harrison	1,975		
Labour	John Douglas McNicholas	1,852		
Labour	Philip David Townshend	1,603		
Conservative	Michael Antony Hammon	1,396		
Conservative	Margaret Veronica Rigby	1,334		
Conservative	Marcus Edgar Lapsa	1,163		
Independent	Christine Margaret Oddy	1,156		
Liberal Democrats	Richard Ian Kay	765		
Socialist Alternative	Jane Ashwell	561		
Majority				
Turnout				
Labour hold		Swing		
Labour hold		Swing		
Labour hold		Swing		

Radford ward
Party	Candidate	Votes	%	±%
Labour	Kate Hunter	1,516		
Labour	Anthony Charles Skipper	1,345		
Labour	Keiran Pascal Mulhall	1,309		
Conservative	Mary Craggs	858		
Conservative	Brenda Mary Kelsey	812		
Conservative	Bruce William Peace	776		
Liberal Democrats	Peter Simpson	764		
Liberal Democrats	Sofia Angelica Bridger	728		
Liberal Democrats	Warwick Michael Dumas	716		
Independent	John Joseph Ryan	357		
Marxist Party	David Anderson	222		
Socialist Alternative	Frances Ann Flint	220		
Majority				
Turnout				
Labour hold		Swing		
Labour hold		Swing		
Labour hold		Swing		

St Michael's ward
Party	Candidate	Votes	%	±%
Socialist Alternative	David John Nellist	1,586		
Socialist Alternative	Karen McKay	1,449		
Labour	Suleman Ismail (Solly) Bhyat	1,217		
Socialist Alternative	Robert Piers Windsor	1,201		
Labour	James Matthew O'Boyle	1,201		
Labour	Steven Peter Thomas	1,118		
Conservative	Duncan Thomas Flynn	469		
Conservative	Mary Taylor	436		
Liberal Democrats	Ian Thomas Holmes	409		
Liberal Democrats	Faye Langston	391		
Conservative	Jane Marie Westerman	361		
Majority				
Turnout				
Socialist Alternative hold		Swing		
Socialist Alternative hold		Swing		
Labour gain from Socialist Alternative		Swing		

Sherbourne ward
Party	Candidate	Votes	%	±%
Conservative	Gary Christopher Ridley	1,787		
Conservative	Heather Rutter	1,767		
Conservative	David Arrowsmith	1,727		
Labour	Jayne Elisabeth Innes	1,395		
Labour	Eric Lloyd Linton	1,392		
Labour	Patrick Joseph Walsh	1,316		
Liberal Democrats	William George Haymes	897		
Socialist Alternative	Jason Arnold Toynbee	446		
Majority				
Turnout				
Conservative hold		Swing		
Conservative hold		Swing		
Conservative hold		Swing		

Upper Stoke ward
Party	Candidate	Votes	%	±%
Liberal Democrats	Derek Stephen Benefield	2,119		
Liberal Democrats	Russell David Field	2,047		
Liberal Democrats	Jacqueline Bridget Basu	1,865		
Labour	Sucha Singh Bains	1,776		
Labour	Howard Peter Lacy	1,504		
Labour	David Stuart Welsh	1,480		
Conservative	Roger Bailey	526		
Conservative	Sharon Jane Featherstone	480		
Conservative	Hazel Ann Reece	457		
Socialist Alternative	Eleanor Griffiths	251		
Majority				
Turnout				
Liberal Democrats gain from Labour		Swing		
Liberal Democrats hold		Swing		
Liberal Democrats hold		Swing		

Wainbody ward
Party	Candidate	Votes	%	±%
Conservative	John Anthony Blundell	2,811		
Conservative	Timothy Winspear Sawdon	2,753		
Conservative	Gary Edward Crookes	2,736		
Labour	Pamela Phillips	1,382		
Liberal Democrats	Edward Rhys Williams	1,356		
Labour	Jaswant Singh Sambi	1,240		
Labour	Mohammed Saeed	1,032		
Majority				
Turnout				
Conservative hold		Swing		
Conservative hold		Swing		
Conservative hold		Swing		

Westwood ward
Party	Candidate	Votes	%	±%
Labour	David Henry Batten	1,780		
Conservative	Nigel Charles Lee	1,699		
Labour	Sheila Lacy	1,664		
Conservative	David John Skinner	1,658		
Conservative	Hannah Jane (Jane) O'Neill	1,647		
Labour	Lindsley Harvard	1,459		
Liberal Democrats	Conrad George Stephen Benefield	792		
Independent	Henderson Easton (Harry) Brooks	585		
Socialist Alternative	James Richard Donnelly	424		
Majority				
Turnout				
Labour hold		Swing		
Conservative gain from Independent		Swing		
Labour hold		Swing		

Whoberley ward
Party	Candidate	Votes	%	±%
Conservative	Joan Ann Griffin	1,951		
Conservative	Kenneth Henry Charley	1,906		
Conservative	Clifford Leonard Ridge	1,766		
Labour	Kevin Barry Maton	1,511		
Labour	Joan Ellen Stanton	1,437		
Labour	Michael John Rawson	1,436		
Liberal Democrats	Arthur Hugh Thomas	1,242		
Socialist Alternative	Mark Edward Power	563		
Majority				
Turnout				
Conservative hold		Swing		
Conservative hold		Swing		
Conservative hold		Swing		

Woodlands ward
Party	Candidate	Votes	%	±%
Conservative	Heather Jean Johnson	2,588		
Conservative	Christian Michael Cliffe	2,584		
Conservative	Anthony John O'Neill	2,487		
Labour	Sarah Elizabeth Gold	1,541		
Labour	Myra Stella	1,308		
Labour	Joseph Akpati Ijoma	1,264		
Liberal Democrats	Gilbert Napier Penlington	982		
BNP	Roderick Malcolm Rowley	894		
Socialist Alternative	Jonathan Donald Morley	348		
Majority				
Turnout				
Conservative hold		Swing		
Conservative hold		Swing		
Conservative hold		Swing		

Wyken ward
Party	Candidate	Votes	%	±%
Conservative	Susanna Ella Dixon	1,871		
Conservative	Michael Patrick Noonan	1,647		
Conservative	Yvette Maskell	1,617		
Labour	Colleen Margaret Fletcher	1,469		
Liberal Democrats	Adrian Edward Dyke	1,278		
Labour	John French	1,215		
Labour	Terence Rollings	1,169		
Liberal Democrats	Stephen Howarth	1,129		
Liberal Democrats	Brian Rees Lewis	1,018		
Majority				
Turnout				
Conservative hold		Swing		
Conservative hold		Swing		
Conservative gain from Labour		Swing		
