= 1998 Coventry City Council election =

1998 UK local government election

Elections to Coventry City Council were held on 7 May 1998. One third of the council was up for election and the Labour Party kept overall control of the council.

After the election, the composition of the council was:

- Labour 45
- Conservative 7
- Independent 1
- Others 1

== Election result ==
Coventry local election result 1998
Party	Seats	Gains	Losses	Net gain/loss	Seats %	Votes %	Votes	+/−
Labour	15			-2	78.9			
Conservative	3			+1	15.8			
Others	1			+1	5.3			
