= 2007 Coventry City Council election =

2007 UK local government election

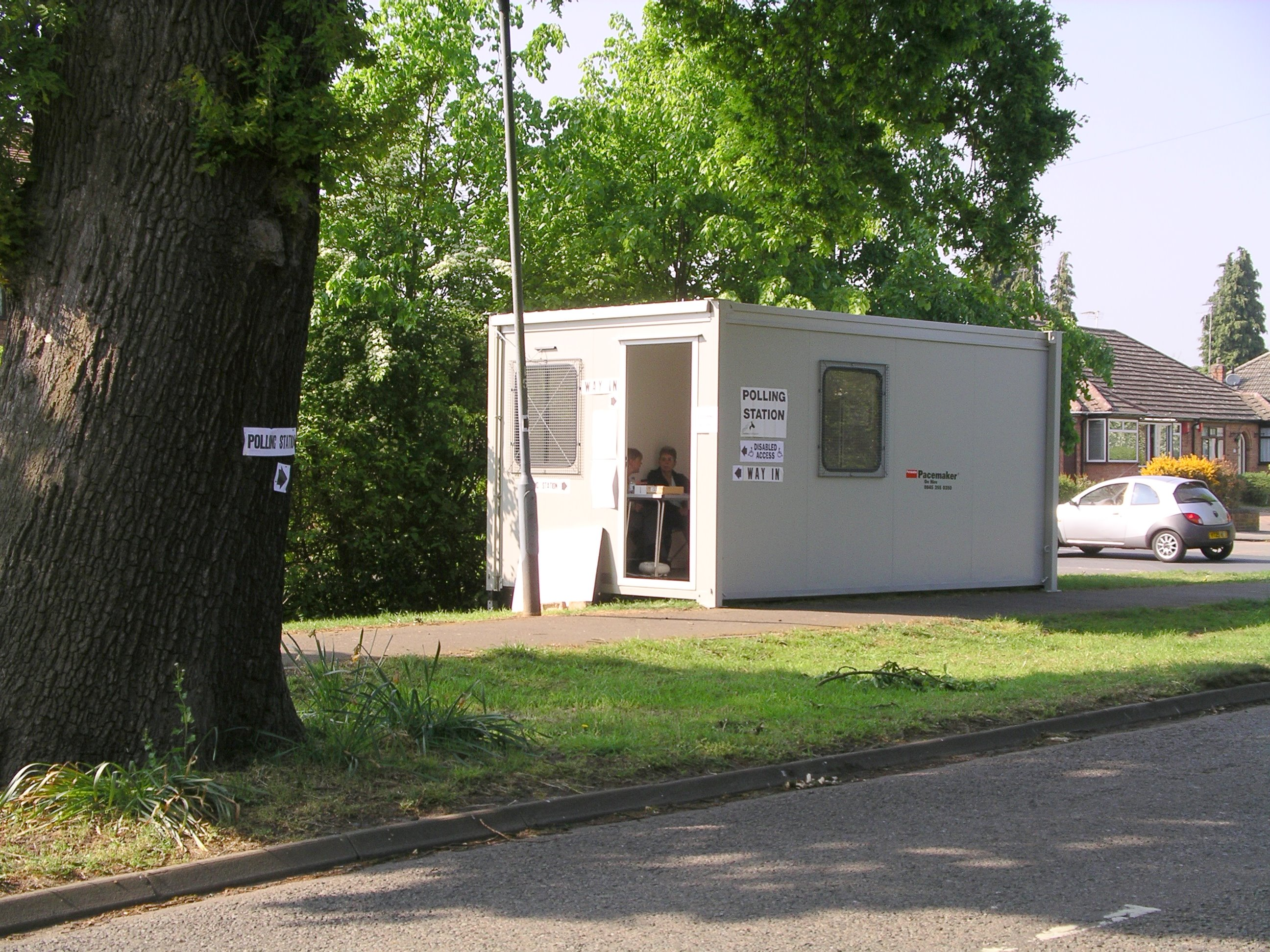
A temporary cabin being used as a polling station in Coventry for the council elections on 3 May 2007

2007 Elections for Coventry City Council were held on Thursday 3 May 2007. As the council is elected by thirds, one seat in each of the wards was up for election.

The Labour Party gained two seats (Foleshill and Wyken) from the Conservative Party one seat (St Michaels) from Socialist Alternative, and one seat (Upper Stoke) from the Liberal Democrats.

The Conservative Party held overall control of the council.

== Election results ==
Map of the results of the 2007 Coventry council election. Labour in red and Conservative in blue.

Coventry local election result 2007
Party	Seats	Gains	Losses	Net gain/loss	Seats %	Votes %	Votes	+/−
Conservative	8	0	2	-2	44.44	34.07	23,974	-3.34
Labour	10	4	0	+4	55.56	38.33	26,978	+2.95
Liberal Democrats	0	0	1	-1	0.00	10.19	7,168	-4.45
BNP	0	0	0	0	0.00	8.53	6,002	N/A
Green	0	0	0	0	0.00	3.07	2,159	N/A
Independent	0	0	0	0	0.00	3.00	2,111	-2.07
Socialist Alternative	0	0	1	-1	0.00	2.48	1,744	-1.41
Respect	0	0	0	0	0.00	0.22	156	N/A

== Council Composition ==
The composition of the council before and after the election can be found in the following table:

Party	Previous council	Staying councillors	Seats up for election	Election result	New council
Conservative	29	19	10	8	28
Labour	19	13	6	10	23
Socialist Alternative	3	2	1	0	2
Liberal Democrats	2	1	1	0	1
BNP	0	0	0	0	0
Green	0	0	0	0	0
Independent	0	0	0	0	0
Respect	0	0	0	0	0
Total	54	36	18	18	54

== Ward results ==
Bablake ward
Party	Candidate	Votes	%	±%
Conservative	Brian Kelsey	2,126	47.96	
Labour	Mal Mutton	1,147	25.87	
Liberal Democrats	Peter Simpson	510	11.50	
BNP	Michele Jean Stone	401	9.05	
Green	Gianluca Grimalda	249	5.62	
Majority		979	22.08	
Turnout		4,433	37.70	
Conservative hold		Swing		

Binley and Willenhall ward
Party	Candidate	Votes	%	±%
Labour	Ram Lakha	1,733	46.39	
Conservative	Denise Beech	1,010	27.03	
BNP	David Clarke	561	15.02	
Liberal Democrats	Geoffrey Brian Sewards	306	8.19	
Green	Cathy Wattebot	126	3.37	
Majority		723	19.35	
Turnout		3,736	32.40	
Labour hold		Swing		

Cheylesmore ward
Party	Candidate	Votes	%	±%
Conservative	Kevin John Foster	1,803	42.49	
Labour	Jean Jackson	1,342	31.63	
Liberal Democrats	Terence Kenny	423	9.97	
BNP	Zoe Gale Hughes	350	8.25	
Green	Bryn Tittle	325	7.66	
Majority		461	10.86	
Turnout		4,243	36.40	
Conservative hold		Swing		

Earlsdon ward
Party	Candidate	Votes	%	±%
Conservative	Ken Taylor	2,364	48.51	
Labour	Christopher Nicholas Youett	1,241	25.46	
Green	Scott Gordon Redding	652	13.38	
Liberal Democrats	Vincent John McKee	427	8.76	
BNP	Joanne Felvus-McCarron	189	3.89	
Majority		1,123	23.05	
Turnout		4,873	41.96	
Conservative hold		Swing		

Foleshill ward
Party	Candidate	Votes	%	±%
Labour	Abdul Salam Khan	2,577	57.77	
Conservative	Mohammed Asif	1,359	30.46	
Respect	Caron McKenna	156	3.50	
Liberal Democrats	Susan Jane Johnston-Wilder	155	3.48	
BNP	Thomas Paul Jones	105	2.35	
Green	Penny Walker	92	2.06	
Independent	Andrew Murdoch	17	0.38	
Majority		1,218	27.30	
Turnout		4,461	44.47	
Labour gain from Conservative		Swing		

Henley ward
Party	Candidate	Votes	%	±%
Labour	Lynnette Catherine Kelly	1,672	49.39	
Conservative	Harbans Gumman	910	26.88	
BNP	Mark Badrick	422	12.47	
Socialist Alternative	Josie Kenny	381	11.26	
Majority		762	22.51	
Turnout		3,385	27.86	
Labour hold		Swing		

Holbrook ward
Party	Candidate	Votes	%	±%
Labour	Joe Clifford	1,673	48.66	
Conservative	Hazel Ann Reece	833	24.23	
Liberal Democrats	Dennis Herbert Jeffery	481	13.99	
BNP	Simon Bien	451	13.12	
Majority		840	24.43	
Turnout		3,438	29.67	
Labour hold		Swing		

Longford ward
Party	Candidate	Votes	%	±%
Labour	Linda Joyce Bigham	2,073	56.78	
Conservative	Val Stone	1.079	29.55	
BNP	Leisel Dawn Wagstaff	286	7.83	
Green	Natalia Grana	213	5.84	
Majority		994	27.23	
Turnout		3,651	29.23	
Labour hold		Swing		

Lower Stoke ward
Party	Candidate	Votes	%	±%
Labour	John Douglas McNicholas	1,810	46.20	
Conservative	Jaswant Singh Birdi	1,060	27.06	
Independent	Christine Margaret Oddy	629	16.05	
BNP	Darren Thomas	419	10.69	
Majority		750	19.14	
Turnout		3,918	33.39	
Labour hold		Swing		

Radford ward
Party	Candidate	Votes	%	±%
Labour	Tony Skipper	1,663	51.17	
Conservative	Jane Marie Williams	670	20.61	
BNP	Tracey Whitehouse	359	11.05	
Liberal Democrats	Peter Jonathon Johnston-Wilder	282	8.68	
Green	Daniel Joseph Finnan	144	4.43	
Independent	Dave Anderson	132	4.06	
Majority		993	30.55	
Turnout		3,250	27.64	
Labour hold		Swing		

Sherbourne ward
Party	Candidate	Votes	%	±%
Conservative	David Vincent Smith	1,197	32.55	
Labour	Faye Sweet	1,175	31.96	
Independent	Heather Rutter	416	11.31	
Liberal Democrats	Arthur Hugh Thomas	392	10.66	
BNP	Justin Baldwin	290	7.89	
Socialist Alternative	Jason Arnold Toynbee	207	5.63	
Majority		22	0.60	
Turnout		3,677	31.39	
Conservative hold		Swing		

Heather Rutter was the former Conservative councillor for Sherbourne ward who stood as an independent after being deselected. The result of Conservative hold is a comparison to when this seat was last contested.

St Michael's ward
Party	Candidate	Votes	%	±%
Labour	Jim O'Boyle	1,240	43.43	
Socialist Alternative	Lindsay Margaret Currie	1,156	40.49	
Conservative	Roger Bailey	459	16.08	
Majority		84	2.94	
Turnout		2,855	25.57	
Labour gain from Socialist Alternative		Swing		

Upper Stoke ward
Party	Candidate	Votes	%	±%
Labour	Raja Mohammed Asif	1,620	38.05	
Liberal Democrats	Russell David Field	1,617	37.98	
Conservative	Brinder Kaur Seni	521	12.24	
BNP	Robert James Gillon	291	6.84	
Independent	Jack Gould	208	4.30	
Independent	Jack Clement Kybird	25	0.59	
Majority		3	0.07	
Turnout		4,257	35.60	
Labour gain from Liberal Democrats		Swing		

Wainbody ward
Party	Candidate	Votes	%	±%
Conservative	Tim Sawdon	2,324	55.51	
Labour	Joe Ijoma	981	23.43	
Liberal Democrats	Napier Penlington	524	12.51	
Green	Emma Biermann	358	8.55	
Majority		1,343	32.08	
Turnout		4,187	35.30	
Conservative hold		Swing		

Westwood ward
Party	Candidate	Votes	%	±%
Conservative	Nigel Charles Lee	1,426	38.10	
Labour	Peter Lacy	1,326	35.43	
BNP	Davied Edward Clarke	456	12.18	
Liberal Democrats	Jacqueline Bridget Basu	374	9.99	
Independent	Judi Lawson	161	4.30	
Majority		100	2.67	
Turnout		3,743	32.20	
Conservative hold		Swing		

Whoberley ward
Party	Candidate	Votes	%	±%
Conservative	Kenneth Henry Charley	1,370	35.14	
Labour	David Stuart Welsh	1,243	31.88	
Liberal Democrats	Brian Rees Lewis	604	15.49	
Independent	Bill Brennan	384	9.85	
BNP	Stephen John Pittaway	298	7.64	
Majority		127	3.26	
Turnout		3,899	34.13	
Conservative hold		Swing		

Woodlands ward
Party	Candidate	Votes	%	±%
Conservative	Christian Michael Cliffe	2,055	47.34	
Labour	Bilal Akhtar	877	20.20	
Liberal Democrats	Stephen Howarth	719	16.56	
BNP	Julie Margaret Allen	690	15.90	
Majority		1,178	27.14	
Turnout		4,341	35.91	
Conservative hold		Swing		

Wyken ward
Party	Candidate	Votes	%	±%
Labour	Hazel Jean Sweet	1,585	39.39	
Conservative	Allan Robert Andrews	1,408	34.99	
BNP	Steven Turner	434	10.78	
Liberal Democrats	Sarah Jane McKenzie-Gill	354	8.80	
Independent	Mick Noonan	164	4.08	
Independent	Adrian Roll	79	1.96	
Majority		177	4.40	
Turnout		4,024	33.81	
Labour gain from Conservative		Swing		

Mick Noonan was the former Conservative councillor for Wyken ward who stood as an independent after being deselected. The result of Conservative hold is a comparison to when this seat was last contested.
