= 2014 Coventry City Council election =

2014 UK local government election

Map of the results

The 2014 Coventry City Council election took place on 22 May 2014 to elect members of Coventry City Council in England. This was on the same day as other local elections.

== Ward results ==
Asterisks denote incumbent councillors seeking re-election.

=== Bablake ===
Bablake (1)
Party	Candidate	Votes	%	±%
Conservative	Jaswant Singh Birdi*	1,506	35	
Labour	Auluck Randhir	1188	28	
UKIP	Paul Robert McNamara	929	22	
Independent	John Gazey	320	7	
Green	John Edward Griffiths	143	3	
Liberal Democrats	Mark Edward Widdop	80	2	
BNP	Mark Badrick	74	2	
TUSC	Dan Crowter	50	1	
Majority		318	7	
Rejected ballots		22		
Turnout		4312	34.11	
Conservative hold		Swing		

=== Binley and Willenhall ===
Binley and Willenhall (1)
Party	Candidate	Votes	%	±%
Labour	John Roderick Mutton*	1,619	45	
UKIP	Colin Aldous Stubbs	1134	32	
Conservative	Sundeep Singh Virk	519	14	
Green	Andy Jones	163	5	
BNP	David Clarke	108	3	
TUSC	Calum Williams	54	2	
Majority		485	13	
Rejected ballots		19		
Turnout		3616	29.14	
Labour hold		Swing		

=== Cheylesmore ===
Cheylesmore (2)
Party	Candidate	Votes	%	±%
Conservative	Roger Maurice James Bailey	1,777	22	
Labour	Richard James Brown	1,738	21	
Conservative	Shabbir Ahmed	1449	18	
Labour	Harjinder Singh Sehmi*	1444	18	
Green	Pete Duckworth	521	6	
Green	John Verdult	392	5	
BNP	Stephen Frances Comer	327	4	
Liberal Democrats	Dennis Herbert Jeffery	206	3	
TUSC	Judy Griffiths	121	1	
TUSC	Jamie Edgar	120	1	
Rejected ballots		32		
Turnout		4331	42.66	
Conservative gain from Labour		Swing		
Labour gain from Vacant		Swing		

=== Earlsdon ===
Earlsdon (1)
Party	Candidate	Votes	%	±%
Conservative	Michael Hammon*	2,129	42	
Labour	Martin Patrick Hartnett	1962	39	
Green	Cathy Wattebot	561	11	
Liberal Democrats	Derek Stephen Benefield	277	5	
TUSC	Fiona Pashazadeh	135	3	
Majority		167	3	
Rejected ballots		40		
Turnout		5106	40.89	
Conservative hold		Swing		

=== Foleshill ===
Foleshill (1)
Party	Candidate	Votes	%	±%
Labour	Tariq Khan*	2,662	74	
Conservative	Marcus Masih	559	16	
Green	Paul Andrews	263	7	
TUSC	Lakshman James Hensman	116	3	
Majority		2103	58	
Rejected ballots		34		
Turnout		3634	29.5	
Labour hold		Swing		

=== Henley ===
Henley (1)
Party	Candidate	Votes	%	±%
Labour	Kevin Barry Maton*	1,663	46	
UKIP	Jim Bench	1124	31	
Conservative	Christian Michael Cliffe	549	15	
Green	George Robinson	161	4	
BNP	Rose Morris	109	3	
TUSC	Kristian Sucilla O'Sullivan	35	1	
Majority		539	15	
Rejected ballots		10		
Turnout		3651	26.98	
Labour hold		Swing		

=== Holbrook ===
Holbrook (1)
Party	Candidate	Votes	%	±%
Labour	Ann Lucas*	1,962	55	
Conservative	David Milner	525	15	
Green	Laura Vesty	489	14	
BNP	Christine Alison Wilkins	292	8	
Independent	Brain David Patton	235	7	
TUSC	Ryan Rochester	69	2	
Majority		1437	40	
Rejected ballots		26		
Turnout		3598	28.37	
Labour hold		Swing		

=== Longford ===
Longford (1)
Party	Candidate	Votes	%	±%
Labour	Lindsley Harvard*	1,970		
UKIP	Eugene Austin	1393		
Conservative	Jennifer Wells	400		
Green	Craig Davenport	159		
BNP	Frankie Bates	78		
TUSC	Lee Cooper	76		
Majority		919		
Rejected ballots		12		
Turnout		3746	27.44	
Labour hold		Swing		

=== Lower Stoke ===
Lower Stoke (1)
Party	Candidate	Votes	%	±%
Labour	Phil Townshend*	1,854	47	
UKIP	Ivor Harold Davies	938	24	
Conservative	Michael Arthur Ballinger	600	15	
Green	Danny Foulstone	259	7	
TUSC	Rob McArdle	248	6	
BNP	Keith Oxford	70	2	
Majority		916	23	
Rejected ballots		15		
Turnout		3984	28.04	
Labour hold		Swing		

=== Radford ===
Radford (1)
Party	Candidate	Votes	%	±%
Labour	Keiran Pascal Mulhall*	1,928	58	
Conservative	Myooran Sri	553	17	
BNP	Arnold Clements	372	11	
Green	Gavin Collins	341	10	
TUSC	Thomas House	124	4	
Majority		1375	41	
Rejected ballots		36		
Turnout		3353	25.35	
Labour hold		Swing		

=== Sherbourne ===
Sherbourne (1)
Party	Candidate	Votes	%	±%
Labour	Seamus Walsh*	1,459	41	
UKIP	Glyn Gordon Davies	937	26	
Conservative	Steven Henry Charles Keough	710	20	
Green	Stephen Gray	285	8	
TUSC	Jason Toynbee	93	3	
BNP	Mark Graham	73	2	
Majority		522	15	
Rejected ballots		14		
Turnout		3573	28.92	
Labour hold		Swing		

=== St Michaels ===
St Michaels (1)
Party	Candidate	Votes	%	±%
Labour	David Welsh*	1,872	57	
TUSC	Dave Nellist	974	30	
Conservative	Maharshi Shrimali	261	8	
Green	Scott Redding	174	5	
Majority		898	27	
Rejected ballots		25		
Turnout		3306	22.31	
Labour hold		Swing		

=== Upper Stoke ===
Upper Stoke (1)
Party	Candidate	Votes	%	±%
Labour	Sucha Singh Bains*	1,912	50	
UKIP	Avtar Taggar	809	21	
Liberal Democrats	Russel David Field	417	11	
Conservative	Laura Dodd	389	10	
Green	John Halpin	134	4	
BNP	John Paul Hurren	94	2	
TUSC	Paul Smith	56	1	
Majority		1103	29	
Rejected ballots		14		
Turnout		3825	28.63	
Labour hold		Swing		

=== Wainbody ===
Wainbody (1)
Party	Candidate	Votes	%	±%
Conservative	Gary Edward Crookes*	1,823	38	
Labour	Rois Ali	1497	31	
UKIP	Mark Taylor	742	15	
Green	Matthew Handley	499	10	
Liberal Democrats	Napier Penlington	227	5	
TUSC	Ellen White	45	1	
Majority		326	7	
Rejected ballots		20		
Turnout		4855	37.08	
Conservative hold		Swing		

=== Westwood ===
Westwood (1)
Party	Candidate	Votes	%	±%
Conservative	David John Skinner*	1,616	41	
Labour	Patricia Seaman	1408	36	
BNP	Darren Thomas	348	9	
Green	Merle Ross Gering	318	8	
Liberal Democrats	Christopher Mark Glenn	150	4	
TUSC	James Richard Donnelly	119	3	
Majority		208	5	
Rejected ballots		25		
Turnout		3979	30.41	
Conservative hold		Swing		

=== Whoberley ===
Whoberley (1)
Party	Candidate	Votes	%	±%
Labour	Bally Singh*	2,015	50	
UKIP	Brian Legge	775	19	
Conservative	Peter Roger Male	643	16	
Green	Rachel Adshead	331	8	
Liberal Democrats	Brian Rees Lewis	180	5	
TUSC	Richard Groves	77	2	
BNP	Leisel Dawn Wagstaff	54	1	
Majority		1240	31	
Rejected ballots		15		
Turnout		4062		
Labour hold		Swing		

=== Woodlands ===
Woodlands (1)
Party	Candidate	Votes	%	±%
Conservative	Julie Elizabeth Lepoidevin*	1,608	37	
Labour	Anne Frances Arlidge	1360	32	
UKIP	Peter John Morris	885	21	
Liberal Democrats	Jacqueline Bridget Basu	179	4	
Green	Anne Patterson	175	4	
BNP	Hunter Hurtsley Helmsley	69	2	
TUSC	Daniel James Smart	40	1	
Majority		248	5	
Rejected ballots		10		
Turnout		4327		
Conservative hold		Swing		

=== Wyken ===
Wyken (1)
Party	Candidate	Votes	%	±%
Labour	Faye Abbott*	1,666	45	
UKIP	Malcolm Scott	996	27	
Conservative	Denise Beech	736	20	
Green	Steven Adams	163	4	
Independent	Adrian Roll	108	3	
TUSC	Glen Martin Watson	40	1	
Majority		670	18	
Rejected ballots		9		
Turnout		3719	28.69	
Labour hold		Swing		
