= Aimee Knight =

British politician and activist

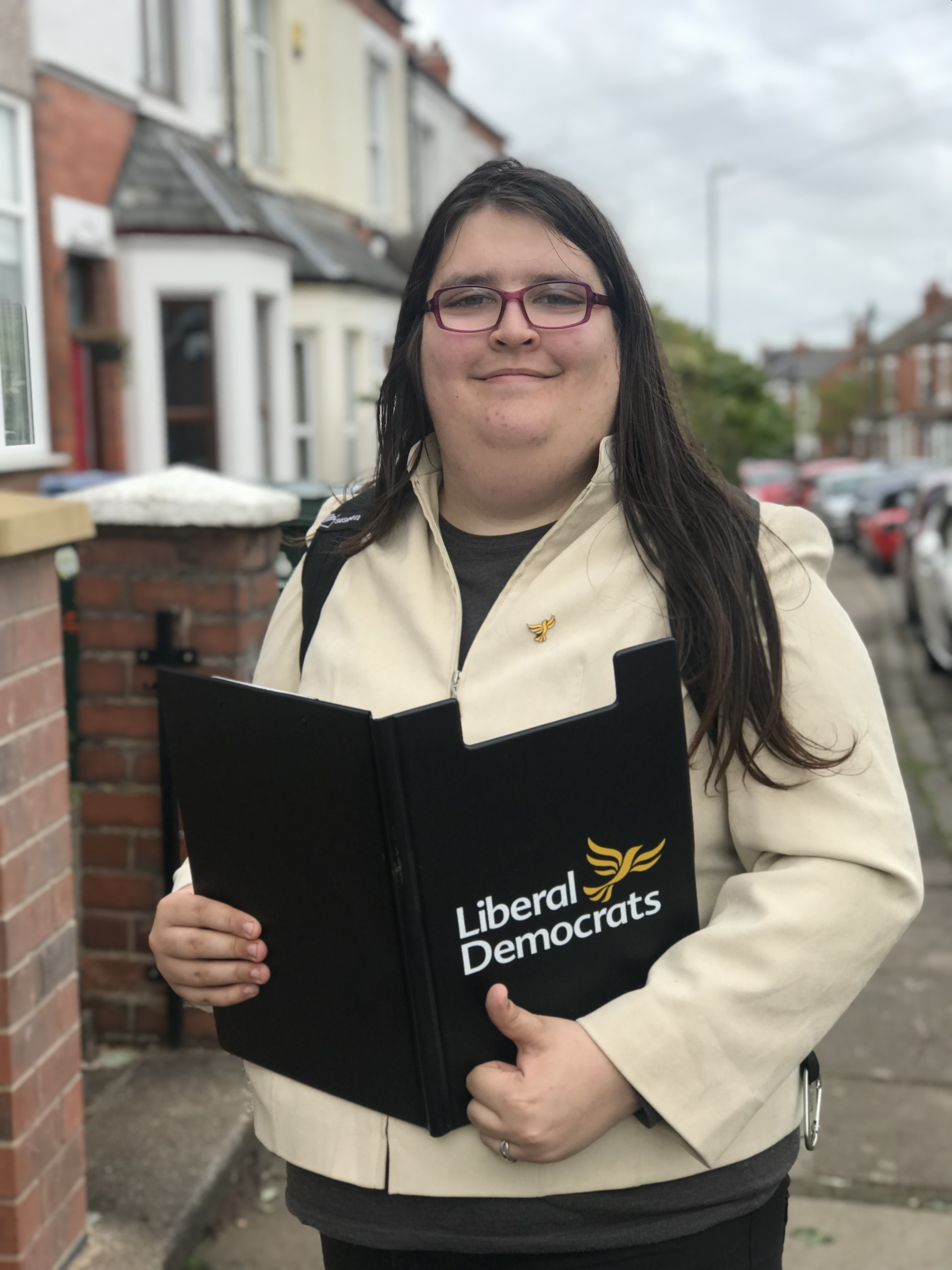
- Knight campaigning for the Liberal Democrats in 2019
- Born: Coventry, West Midlands, England
- Education: Open University
- Organisation: Reddit; (formerly)
- Political party: Liberal Democrats (2018–2020); Green Party (2014–2018)
- Movement: Transgender rights
- Spouse: Nathaniel Knight (m. 2019)
- Parents: David Challenor (father); Tina Challenor (mother)

Aimee Knight (née Challenor) is a British transgender activist and former politician. She was described as a rising star in the Green Party and its equalities spokesperson. In 2018, her father, who had been her election agent, was convicted of raping a child and she was no-fault suspended during an investigation into safeguarding failures by the party. She subsequently joined the Liberal Democrats in 2019 and was suspended after tweets appeared on her fiancé's account stating he fantasized about children having sex, which she attributed to hacking.

Knight later worked for Reddit as an administrator. In March 2021, a moderator was banned for linking to an article which mentioned her. Approximately 200 subreddits went private in protest of the ban and Knight's employment, arguing she hadn't been vetted properly due to her father and fiancé. Reddit's CEO issued a statement that the ban had been the result of an overzealous automated moderating system meant to prevent doxxing and that she was no longer employed by the company.

She has been subject to harassment from anti-trans activists who have attempted to use her to link trans women and transgender rights with child abuse.

== Early life ==
Knight was diagnosed with autism when she was 4. She began identifying as a girl around the age of 10. Knight and her two younger siblings were taken into care in 2013 after social services expressed concerns about her parents. She was educated at Lewis Charlton Learning Centre.

In February 2013, Knight, then 15 and affiliated with Anonymous, was arrested on suspicion of planning to carry out a cyberattack on the Bull Ring website in protest of tax evasion. No charges were brought and the case was eventually dropped.

Knight came out publicly as trans in 2014 at her school's graduation prom when she was 16. The headmaster said she wasn't allowed to wear a dress because it was "unnecessarily attention-seeking" and would make the school "look stupid" but allowed it, following complaints from her parents. She has stated that her transgender identity was questioned because she was autistic, by her extended family when she came out and later by the NHS, which required her to have the autism diagnosis re-confirmed over six months before being referred to a gender services clinic.

Knight then attended Henley College Coventry, where she was the college's National Union of Students (NUS) lesbian, gay, bisexual, and transgender (LGBT) officer. Knight lived with her parents in Coventry in 2018, while studying for a B.A. in philosophy, politics and economics at the Open University.

== Career ==
=== LGBT activism ===
In 2015, Knight was the LGBTQ Officer for Henley College Coventry; she protested the college's censoring of websites such as Birmingham Pride, which were considered "Gay or Lesbian or Bisexual Interest" by the college web blocker. Knight became a member of Stonewall's Trans Advisory Group in 2015, and was an organiser of Coventry Pride in 2016 and 2017.

Knight campaigned for reform the Gender Recognition Act 2004 to make it easier for transgender and non-binary minors to get legal gender recognition to avoid misgendering and difficulties at school. She has compared the struggles trans people face in the UK to the struggles gay people faced under Section 28 with trans people portrayed as sexual predators.

In 2016, after a Transport for London (TfL) helpline employee told Knight that she "didn't sound like a Miss", she successfully campaigned to get TfL to investigate the incident and to use gender-neutral language in announcements, avoiding phrases such as "ladies and gentlemen".

Knight has campaigned against the deportation of LGBTQ+ asylum seekers and criticized British Airways' role in them.

=== Green Party ===
Knight joined the Green Party of England and Wales in November 2014. She was the chair of LGBTIQA+ Greens (LGBT, plus intersex, queer, asexual, and other) between 2015 and 2017. Knight became the party's equality spokesperson in 2016. According to the Green Party, Knight was the only trans spokesperson for a UK political party. Knight stood for Coventry City Council elections as a member of the Green Party in February 2016 and May 2016.

In April 2017, Knight helped co-found the Global Greens LGBT+ Network alongside colleagues from Die Grünen, Groen, Taiwan Tree Party, and Taiwan Green Party.

In 2017, Knight was elected to the Greens' national executive committee. In June 2017, Knight was the Green candidate for Coventry South. She received 1.3% of the vote share, with 604 votes. Knight stood in the 2018 party election to be deputy leader, which closed at the end of August. Knight chose her father as her election agent for the 2017 general election and also the 2018 council elections while he was on bail.

==== Verita investigation ====
Knight's father, David Challenor, became a member of the Green Party in December 2015 when Knight gifted him a membership. The same year he was reported to the West Midlands Police for raping and torturing a 10 year old girl. He was charged in court in November 2016 and on the same day Knight alerted the chair of the Green's national executive committee and one of its PR chiefs that he had been charged with sexual offenses but neglected to mention he was a party member. In 2017 and 2018 Knight hired her father as her election agent while he was out on bail. She did not know the full details of the charges. In August 2018, Knight's father was sentenced to 22 years in prison for the crime. After her father's sentencing, Knight stood down from the Green Party's deputy leadership election, releasing a statement that she was horrified and saddened by his crimes and had only learnt the details of them just before his conviction.

Knight was consequently suspended from the party on a no-fault basis, and the party launched an inquest into possible safeguarding failures as her father was allowed to act as her election agent after having been charged. In September 2018, Knight resigned from the Green Party citing transphobia and criticizing former party leader Caroline Lucas for meeting with Woman's Place UK, who Knight described as a "hate group". She denied this was due to the investigation.

Verita, the firm hired to perform the inquiry, found in January 2019 that she had committed a "serious error of judgement" in appointing her father as her campaign manager though she was in difficult circumstances and not given "training and support". It found the colleagues she alerted had "closed the matter off too quickly and should have followed up more" and failed to inform the local party. The report recommended the party update its code of conduct, review its safeguarding policies, and speak to the police department about whether it should have notified them of the charges.

=== Liberal Democrats ===
In October 2018, she joined the Liberal Democrats, becoming the Diversity Officer for Coventry. She was suspended from the party in July 2019 following an investigation after tweets appeared on her partner's account stating he fantasized about children having sex with other children and adults. Knight told The Sunday Times that her partner's account had been hacked and that she and him condemned the messages in them.

She stated she would be quitting politics by December following abuse and harassment.

=== Reddit ===
Knight began working as an unpaid moderator for subreddits such as r/lgbt, then did contract work, for the Reddit Public Access Network, and was hired as an administrator by Reddit. In 2020, she helped write an open letter to Reddit's administrators about anti-LGBT harassment.

In March 2021, Reddit banned a moderator for the r/ukpolitics subreddit for sharing a Spectator Magazine article mentioning Knight. The r/ukpolitics sub went private, followed by over 200 subreddits in protest of both the bans and of the hiring of Knight, arguing she was not suitable due to her hiring of her father. Reddit reversed the ban and posted a statement from their CEO Steve Huffman that Knight had been "the target of harassment and doxxing" earlier that month and Reddit had activated an automated moderation rule which had been too broad. He stated that Knight had been inadequately vetted before being hired, was no longer employed at the company, and that they would review their relevant internal processes.

During the Reddit controversy, she received transphobic abuse on Twitter; anti-trans activist Graham Linehan widely publicized her employment at Reddit using her deadname and derogatory language.

== Personal life ==
She is married to Nathaniel Knight and moved to the USA following her suspension from the Liberal Democrats. Since coming out, she has been attacked on social media, including barrages of offensive tweets. Anti-trans activists have harassed Knight and attempted to use her story to link the transgender rights movement and trans women with child abuse.

In May 2018, BBC News published an article that quoted trans writer Miranda Yardley describing Knight as a "man". Knight said that the BBC did not contact her about the article before its publication, though following readers' complaints she was asked to comment, and her response was added to the article.
