= Socialist Party (England and Wales) =

Political party in England and Wales

Socialist Party Welsh: Plaid Sosialaidd Cymru
- General Secretary: Hannah Sell
- Founder: Peter Taaffe
- Founded: 1997; 29 years ago
- Preceded by: Militant (1964–1991); Militant Labour (1991–1997)
- Headquarters: Enfield, London, England
- Newspaper: The Socialist
- Youth wing: Young Socialists
- Membership: c. 2,000 (2016)
- Ideology: Trotskyism; Marxism; Socialism; Revolutionary socialism
- Political position: Far-left
- National affiliation: Socialist Green Unity Coalition (2005–2010)
- European affiliation: European Anti-Capitalist Left
- International affiliation: Committee for a Workers' International
- Electoral alliance: TUSC
- Colours: Red

Website
- socialistparty.org.uk

The Socialist Party (Welsh: Plaid Sosialaidd Cymru) is a Trotskyist political party in England and Wales. Founded in 1997, it had formerly been Militant tendency, a Trotskyist entryist group in the Labour Party from 1964 to 1991, which became Militant Labour from 1991 until 1997. It is a member of the refounded Committee for a Workers' International, and the Trade Unionist and Socialist Coalition

== History ==
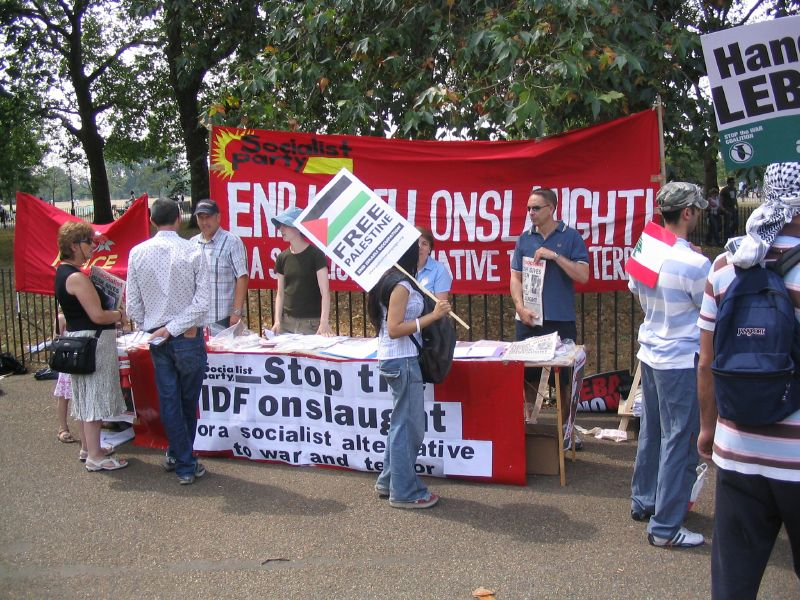
Socialist Party booth at a protest against the 2006 Lebanon War.

The Socialist Party was formerly the Militant group, which practised entryism in the Labour Party. In the 1980s, Militant supporters Dave Nellist, Pat Wall and Terry Fields were elected to the House of Commons as Labour MPs. In 1982, Liverpool District Labour Party adopted Militant's policies for Liverpool City Council in its battle against cuts in the rate support grant from government, and came into conflict with the Conservative government.

In 1991, there was a debate within Militant as to whether to continue working within the Labour Party, centred around whether they could still effectively operate in the party following the expulsions. The group became Militant Labour in 1991, after leaving the Labour Party. In 1997, Militant Labour changed its name to the Socialist Party, and the Militant newspaper was renamed The Socialist.

The party was involved in founding the Socialist Alliance in the late 1990s, being chaired by Dave Nellist. The group left the alliance in November 2001 following a change to a One Member, One Vote system by the SWP leading to fears of SWP domination.

The 2009 Lindsey Oil Refinery strikes were one of the only times the party received attention from outside the far left.

In March 2009, the Socialist Party was invited to participate in No to EU – Yes to Democracy (No2EU), a left-wing alter-globalisation coalition by the RMT union leader Bob Crow, for the 2009 European Parliament elections. This alliance later developed into the Trade Unionist and Socialist Coalition (TUSC), of which the party is a member.

During Jeremy Corbyn's leadership of the Labour Party, members of the Socialist Party attempted to join the former, with then leader of the Socialist Party, Peter Taaffe, stating they hoped to be able to affiliate to the Labour Party and stand joint candidates at future general elections. Labour Party sources however distanced themselves from such attempts, highlighting the rules preventing active members of other parties joining the Labour Party.

In 2018 and 2019, the party was involved in a dispute within the predecessor Committee for a Workers' International (1974) around the questions of socialism and identity politics. The Socialist Party, as part of the “In Defence of a Working Class and Trotskyist CWI” (IDWCTCWI) faction, re-established a revived Committee for a Workers' International in 2019 that considers itself a continuance of the original CWI (though this is disputed).

== Youth and student campaigning ==
The SP founded Young Socialists, which is organised as a caucus as a 'youth group' within the party.

Socialist Students is another organisation founded by members of the SP. Although not considered the student faction of the party, they operate independently to ensure inclusivity of political belief between its members to control the freedom of discourse and discussion. Socialist Students are affiliated and co-affiliated with university and college societies around the UK.

The SP have helped Socialist Students in past campaigns by promoting them in their newspaper The Socialist and sharing them with its members, such as their 'Funding Not Fees' campaign in February 2025 after the Leicester Socialist Students Conference.

== Electoral activity ==
Due to the existence of the Socialist Party of Great Britain, the Socialist Party is registered with the UK Government Electoral Commission under the name of Socialist Alternative.

The Socialist Party contested three seats at the 1992 United Kingdom general election, and 21 at the 1997 United Kingdom general election.

== Trade union activity ==
In 2025, the New Statesman reported that left groups, including the Socialist Party, had united behind Andrea Egan's campaign for Unison General Secretary. Egan, expelled from Labour in 2022, had "reached out to other left groups, including the Socialist Party, to avoid dividing support". In 2021, The Guardian reported that Unite General Secretary Sharon Graham’s successful election campaign for General Secretary was "backed by the Socialist Workers Party and the Socialist Party.” A 2025 article in The Daily Telegraph claimed that Sharon Graham, as Unite General Secretary, ‘surrounded herself with people from the Socialist Party’.

== See also ==
- Campaign for a New Workers' Party
- History of socialism in Great Britain
- Anti-austerity movement in the United Kingdom
- Politics of the United Kingdom
- Socialist Party (Ireland)
