= 1903 Warwick and Leamington by-election =

UK parliamentary by-election

Warwick and Leamington by-election, 1903
← 1900	23 October 1903	1906 →
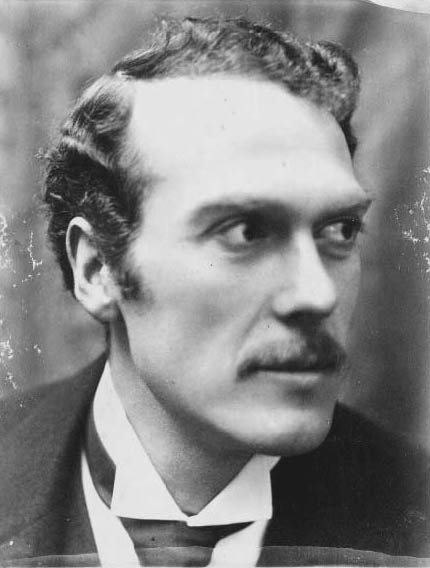

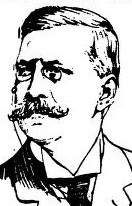
Candidate	Lyttelton	Berridge
Party	Liberal Unionist	Liberal
Popular vote	2,689	2,499
Percentage	51.8%	48.2%
MP before election
Alfred Lyttelton
Conservative
Subsequent MP
Alfred Lyttelton
Conservative

The 1903 Warwick and Leamington by-election was a Parliamentary by-election held on 23 October 1903. The constituency returned one Member of Parliament (MP) to the House of Commons of the United Kingdom, elected by the first past the post voting system.

== Electoral history ==
General Election 1900: Warwick and Leamington
Party	Candidate	Votes	%	±%
Liberal Unionist	Alfred Lyttelton	2,785	58.8	N/A
Liberal	Halford Mackinder	1,954	41.2	New
Majority		831	17.6	N/A
Turnout		4,739	80.1	N/A
Liberal Unionist hold		Swing	N/A	

== Result ==
The Liberal Unionist Party held the seat:

Warwick and Leamington by-election, 1903
Party	Candidate	Votes	%	±%
Liberal Unionist	Alfred Lyttelton	2,689	51.8	−7.0
Liberal	Thomas Berridge	2,499	48.2	+7.0
Majority		190	3.6	−14.0
Turnout		5,188	86.5	+6.4
Liberal Unionist hold		Swing	-7.0	

== Aftermath ==
At the following General Election the result was:

General Election 1906: Warwick and Leamington
Party	Candidate	Votes	%	±%
Liberal	Thomas Berridge	3,011	51.8	+3.6
Liberal Unionist	Alfred Lyttelton	2,802	48.2	−3.6
Majority		209	3.6	N/A
Turnout		5,813	92.3	+5.8
Liberal gain from Liberal Unionist		Swing	+3.6	
