= Dudley Smith =

British Conservative politician (1926-2016)

Sir Dudley Smith

President of the Assembly of Western European Union
- In office 14 June 1993 – 1996
- Preceded by: Hartmut Soell
- Succeeded by: Lluís Maria de Puig

Chairman of the Western European Union Defence Committee
- In office 1989–1993

Secretary-General of the European Democratic Group
- In office 1983–1986

Under-Secretary of State for the Army
- In office 7 January 1974 – 4 March 1974
- Prime Minister: Edward Heath
- Preceded by: Peter Blaker
- Succeeded by: Desmond Brayley

Parliamentary Under-Secretary of State for Employment
- In office 24 June 1970 – 7 January 1974
- Prime Minister: Edward Heath
- Preceded by: Harold Walker
- Succeeded by: David Howell

Member of Parliament
- In office 29 March 1968 – 8 April 1997
- Preceded by: John Hobson
- Succeeded by: James Plaskitt
- Constituency: Warwick and Leamington
- In office 8 October 1959 – 10 March 1966
- Preceded by: Laddie Lucas
- Succeeded by: Michael Barnes
- Constituency: Brentford & Chiswick

Personal details
- Born: 14 November 1926 Cambridge, England
- Died: 14 December 2016 (aged 90) Warwickshire, England
- Citizenship: British
- Party: Conservative
- Children: 3
- Education: Chichester High School
- Occupation: Journalist, Politician

Sir Dudley Gordon Smith (14 November 1926 – 14 December 2016) was a British Conservative politician who served as a junior minister under Edward Heath. He was a Member of Parliament for a total of 35 years, latterly for Warwick and Leamington, which he represented for almost 30 years before he lost his seat in the Labour landslide in the 1997 general election.

== Early life and career ==
Smith was born on 14 November 1926 in Cambridge to Hugh and Elizabeth Smith. His father ran a small business. He attended Chichester High School in West Sussex but left at the age of 16 to pursue in career in journalism which he started by joining the local paper. In 1945 he joined Portsmouth Evening News, then The News of the World as a Fleet Street reporter. Finally, by 1953 he had joined the Sunday Express, going onto become Assistant News Editor under the Editor Sir John Junor.

== Political career ==
Eager to become a politician, Smith unsuccessfully fought Peckham in 1955, losing to incumbent Freda Corbet by 13,768. He went onto serve on the Middlesex county council, becoming its youngest member. Smith served as the Conservative council's Chief Whip, alongside his parliamentary duties, until 1965.

=== Member of Parliament for Brentford & Chiswick: 1959–1966 ===
Dudley Smith was eventually successful in winning the Brentford & Chiswick by 2,919 votes in the 1959 general election.

Despite only being in the House for 4 years, in 1963 Smith played the leading role in opposing deportation of Anthony Enahoro to Nigeria where he would face charges of treason. The fact that he took on this challenge was largely due to Enahoro's arrest taking place in his constituency. For 2 months, he used all parliamentary means to persuade the Home Secretary, Henry Brooke, to not deport the Chief. Smith claimed that Enahoro could not be deported as he would potentially face execution. Despite this, his efforts failed, and Anthony Enahoro was deported and subsequently jailed for 15 years.

Other areas that Smith took an interest in during his first parliament included sanitary concerns over the River Thames, and more radically local tax reform. Sixty Conservative MPs called for education to be funded directly by the Treasury instead of by local rates.

As troubles grew for the then Prime Minister Harold Macmillan, Smith was part of a group of relatively young Tory MPs in early 1963 who called for a change in leadership. Their preference was Edward Heath, the Lord Privy Seal who would subsequently become leader and prime minister, or Reginald Maudling, the Chancellor of the Exchequer over that of then favourite Rab Butler, or Iain Macleod. Ultimately Lord Home was chosen as the successor.

1963 also saw Smith became PPS to Robert Carr, Minister for Technical Cooperation, then as an opposition whip in 1964. However, his climb in power was cut short by the Labour victory in the 1964 general election, and then Smith losing his seat in 1966 to Labour's Michael Barnes by 607 votes.

=== Member of Parliament for Warwick & Leamington: 1968–1997 ===
Following a brief 2 years as director for public relations for the Beecham Group, Dudley Smith yet again found himself in the Commons as MP for Warwick and Leamington which he won with a majority of 21,922 in the 1968 Warwick and Leamington by-election. It was triggered by the death of the former Attorney General, Sir John Hobson.

As the opposition spokesman on employment and productivity, and with his former boss Robert Carr who was now Shadow Minister of Labour, Smith argued in 1969 that the Secretary of State for Employment and Productivity, Barbara Castle, should hold to her ‘In Place of Strife’ white paper which proposed to restrict the powers of the trade unions. She did adhere to their advice. As a result of the Conservative Party returning to power as a result of the 1970 general election, the new prime minister, Edward Heath, put Smith under Carr as Under-Secretary for Employment. He played a key role in the passage of the controversial Industrial Relations Bill. 1974 saw him moved to the Ministry of Defence as Under-Secretary of State for the Army, a post he held for a mere nine weeks due to Heath's failed re-election bid in the February 1974 snap general election which saw the Prime Minister's rival, Harold Wilson, returned to power. It was not, however, an uneventful time at the MoD since Smith did visit the survivors of the 1974 IRA's M62 coach bombing in hospital.

Dudley Smith never returned to government, spending his time as vice-chairman of the Select Committee on Race Relations and Immigration between 1978 and 1979. With the Conservative victory in the 1979 general election, the new prime minister, Margaret Thatcher, sent him to Europe as part of the British delegation to the Council of Europe and the Western European Union (WEU). During his eighteen years in Europe, Smith served from 1983 to 1986 as secretary-general of the European Democratic Group, from 1989 to 1993 as chairman of the WEU Defence Committee and finally as president of the WEU Assembly until 1997.

Dudley Smith had been an early admirer of Mrs Thatcher, evidenced by his verbal support of the Public Bodies (Admission to Meetings) Act 1960, which she had drawn up and introduced her maiden speech. During the Thatcher years, Smith showed signs of being an ardent Thatcherite, indeed often being to the right of his prime minister on many social issues. Despite this, he demonstrated clear dissatisfaction with her leadership, which had been damaged by the resignation of Nigel Lawson and the Poll Tax, by using a football analogy in May 1990: “Do you sack the manager or don’t you? You may have a good manager but what if the team isn’t scoring goals?”. This sentiment was felt by many Tory MPs which ultimately led to her downfall.

He was knighted in 1983.

Smith found himself in controversy in 1995 when a Greek Cypriot claimed that a holiday home in Northern Cyprus, which Smith has leased for twelve years, had in fact been his property prior to the 1974 Turkish invasion. Smith denied the man had ever owned the property.

Although previously Warwick and Leamington had been considered a safe seat, the 1997 general election saw Tony Blair’s New Labour win a landslide leading the 70-year-old Smith to losing his seat after over 35 years in parliament.

== Outside of parliament ==
Prior to the 1964 general election, Dudley Smith published a biography of Harold Wilson, the Leader of the Opposition, entitled Harold Wilson: A critical biography. In 1981 he became the Chairman of the Wilderness Foundation UK. In 1988, he became Deputy Lieutenant for Warwickshire. He was a Freeman of the City of London and was Chairman from 1985 to 1990 for the United and Cecil Club. He was a governor Mill Hill School for three decades.

Over the latter half of his career, his business interests grew which led to criticism that he was just a voice for big drug companies in the House of Commons. In 1995 it was revealed that he was the third-highest earner for MPs with outside interests with contracts worth £55,000.

== Political ideology and views ==
Dudley Smith views could often be described as socially conservative, with him calling for tighter restrictions on pornography. He even went as far as to call for the Guardian to be prosecuted for quoting from D. H. Lawrence’s ‘explicit’ book, Lady Chatterley's Lover. Despite this, he has generally promoted press freedom as a former journalist. He believed in hanging, thought life imprisonment should mean at least 25 years, was against anti-homosexual law reform and was for curbs on abortion. He took a fairly sceptical view of mass immigration, calling for "a final halt to immigration as we know it” in 1979. He criticised the then Labour Home Secretary, Merlyn Rees, who he felt had “completely failed to grasp the problem” of illegal immigration. Smith opposed allowing immigrant women who had British citizenship to bring in their partners.

Smith's views on the European Union became increasingly Eurosceptic during the 1990s, especially after the Maastricht Treaty. In 1996, he warned that the EU was becoming too federalist, stating in an interview with Jane's Defence Weekly that “the $64,000 question is how we deal with the predatory attitude of the EU as it tries to take over defence…We’re not against the EU, but it doesn’t have to run everything”. This view was to become Conservative Party policy for the next two decades with the view that Britain should be “in Europe but not run by Europe".

== Personal life and death ==
Smith was married twice, first in 1958 Anthea Higgins with whom he had three children, a son, Russell, and two daughters, Charlotte and Antonia. They divorced in 1973 following his wife's affair with her husband's fellow Conservative MP Tim Fortescue, member for Liverpool Garston, who she later married. In 1976, Smith married again, this time to a management consultant called Catherine Amos. However, this also ended in divorce in 2011.

Dudley Smith died in Warwickshire on 14 December 2016, at the age of 90.

Parliament of the United Kingdom
| Preceded by Percy Lucas | Member of Parliament for Brentford and Chiswick; 1959–1966 | Succeeded by Michael Barnes |
| Preceded by John Hobson | Member of Parliament for Warwick and Leamington; 1968–1997 | Succeeded by James Plaskitt |
