= Jim Garton =

British electrical engineer and socialist activist

Charles George Garton (born 29 August 1901) was a British electrical engineer and socialist activist.

Born in Rugby, Garton left school at the age of fourteen to undertake an apprenticeship as a blacksmith, but later studied electrical engineering at the Rugby College of Technology. He joined the Independent Labour Party (ILP), and was also active in the Labour Guild of Youth, although a local vicar condemned him for leading moonlight rambles including both men and women. At the 1929 United Kingdom general election, he stood as the Labour Party candidate for Warwick and Leamington, taking third place with 16% of the vote. During the campaign, the Leamington Courier described him as "a revolutionary in the matter of dress . . . wearing in winter and summer alike an open-necked tennis shirt and no hat".

Garton stood again at the 1931 United Kingdom general election. He was unable to win the backing of either the Labour Party or the ILP, but was supported by the local Constituency Labour Party. Against a single opponent, he managed only 19.4% of the vote. He served as the Midlands District representative on the ILP's National Administrative Committee from 1931, and in 1932 moved the motion arguing that the ILP should remain affiliated to the Labour Party provided that certain conditions were met - hoping that the Labour Party was moving to the left and would agree to them. This position was approved at the ILP's conference, but the conditions were not met, and so the ILP disaffiliated.

Late in 1933, Garton moved to Moscow, to work for the All Union Electro-technical Institute. The following year, he spoke at the ILP's summer school in support of the Communist Party of the Soviet Union and the ILP's Revolutionary Policy Committee. He remained in Russia until 1937, when he returned to the UK, to become a research officer with the Electrical Research Association, then served as head of its materials department from 1946, retiring in 1966.

Garton wrote a number of publications on electrical engineering. He was made a Fellow of the Institute of Physics, and a Fellow of the Institution of Electrical Engineers. The Garton Effect is named for him.

Party political offices
Preceded by Frank Wise	Midlands Division representative on the National Administrative Council of the Independent Labour Party; 1931–1933	Succeeded by Sam Leckie
