= 1957 Warwick and Leamington by-election =

UK Parliamentary by-election

The 1957 Warwick and Leamington by-election was fought on 7 March 1957 when the incumbent Conservative MP, the ex-Prime Minister Sir Anthony Eden, retired from Parliament. The seat was retained by the Conservative candidate John Hobson.

== Result ==
Warwick and Leamington by-election, 1957
Party	Candidate	Votes	%	±%
Conservative	John Hobson	24,948	52.26	−12.22
Labour	William Wilson	22,791	47.74	+12.22
Majority		2,157	4.52	−24.44
Turnout		47,739		
Conservative hold		Swing	−12.2	
