= Anthony Eden =

Prime Minister of the United Kingdom from 1955 to 1957

The Right Honourable The Earl of Avon KG MC PC
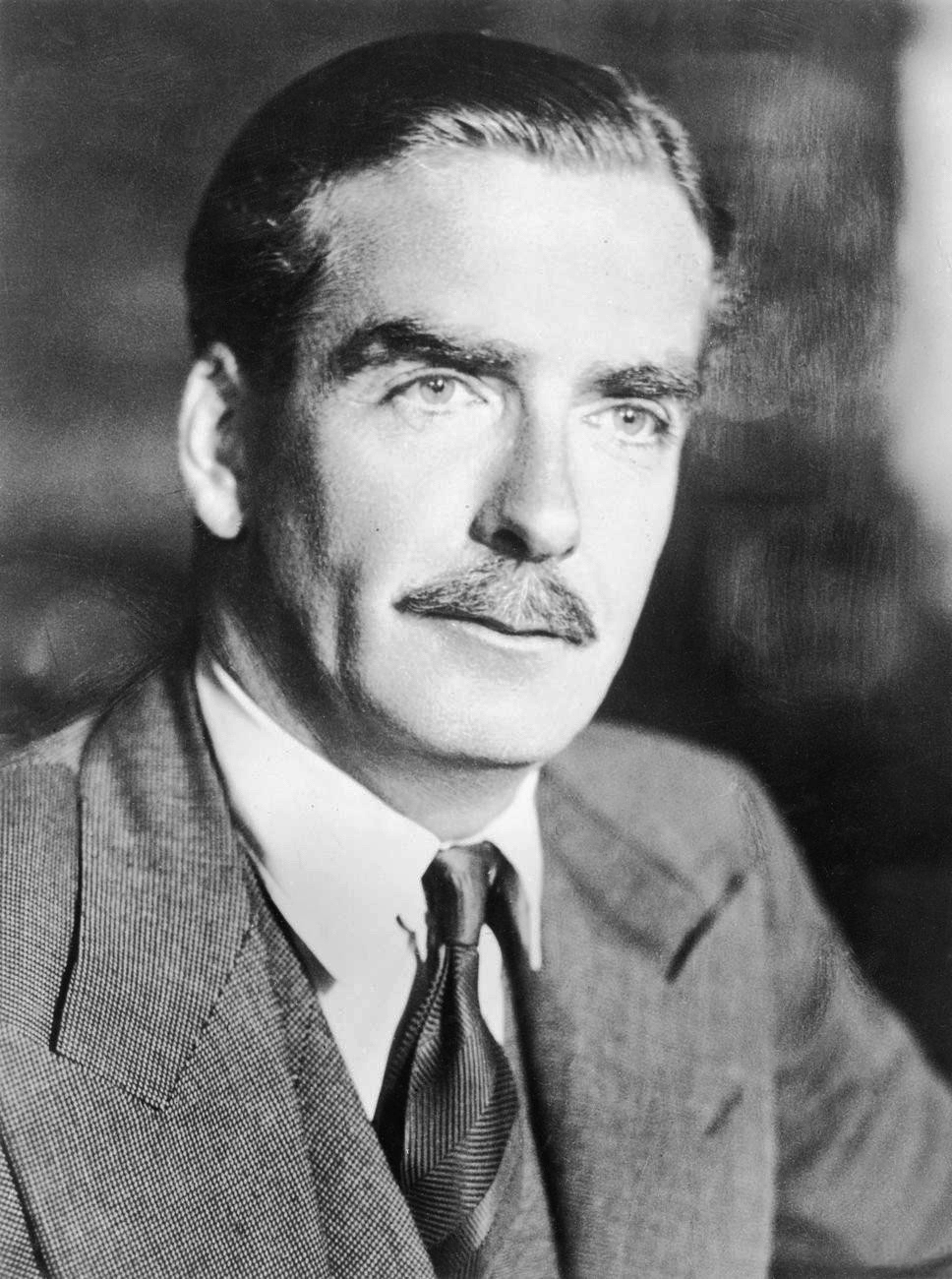
- Eden, c. 1941-42

Prime Minister of the United Kingdom
- In office 6 April 1955 – 9 January 1957
- Monarch: Elizabeth II
- Preceded by: Winston Churchill
- Succeeded by: Harold Macmillan

Leader of the Conservative Party
- In office 6 April 1955 – 10 January 1957
- Chairman: The Viscount Woolton; The Lord Poole
- Preceded by: Winston Churchill
- Succeeded by: Harold Macmillan

Deputy Prime Minister of the United Kingdom
- De facto 26 October 1951 – 6 April 1955
- Prime Minister: Winston Churchill
- Preceded by: Herbert Morrison (de facto)
- Succeeded by: Rab Butler (de facto)
Ministerial offices
Secretary of State for Foreign Affairs
In office 28 October 1951 – 6 April 1955
Prime Minister	Winston Churchill
Preceded by	Herbert Morrison
Succeeded by	Harold Macmillan
In office 22 December 1940 – 26 July 1945
Prime Minister	Winston Churchill
Preceded by	The Viscount Halifax
Succeeded by	Ernest Bevin
In office 22 December 1935 – 20 February 1938
Prime Minister	Stanley Baldwin; Neville Chamberlain
Preceded by	Samuel Hoare
Succeeded by	The Viscount Halifax
Leader of the House of Commons
In office 22 November 1942 – 26 July 1945
Prime Minister	Winston Churchill
Preceded by	Stafford Cripps
Succeeded by	Herbert Morrison
Secretary of State for War
In office 11 May 1940 – 22 December 1940
Prime Minister	Winston Churchill
Preceded by	Oliver Stanley
Succeeded by	David Margesson
Secretary of State for Dominion Affairs
In office 3 September 1939 – 14 May 1940
Prime Minister	Neville Chamberlain; Winston Churchill
Preceded by	Thomas Inskip
Succeeded by	The Viscount Caldecote
Lord Keeper of the Privy Seal
In office 31 December 1933 – 7 June 1935
Prime Minister	Ramsay MacDonald
Preceded by	Stanley Baldwin
Succeeded by	The Marquess of Londonderry
Parliamentary Under-Secretary of State for Foreign Affairs
In office 3 September 1931 – 18 January 1934
Prime Minister	Ramsay MacDonald
Preceded by	Hugh Dalton
Succeeded by	The Earl Stanhope

Member of the House of Lords
- Lord Temporal
- Hereditary peerage 12 July 1961 – 14 January 1977
- Preceded by: Peerage established
- Succeeded by: The 2nd Earl of Avon

Member of Parliament for Warwick and Leamington
- In office 6 December 1923 – 10 January 1957
- Preceded by: Ernest Pollock
- Succeeded by: John Hobson

Personal details
- Born: Robert Anthony Eden; 12 June 1897 Rushyford, County Durham, England
- Died: 14 January 1977 (aged 79) Alvediston, Wiltshire, England
- Resting place: St Mary's Churchyard, Alvediston
- Party: Conservative
- Spouses: Beatrice Beckett (m. 1923; div. 1950) Clarissa Spencer-Churchill (m. 1952)
- Children: 3, including Nicholas (by Beckett)
- Parent: Sir William Eden, 7th Bt (father)
- Education: Christ Church, Oxford

Military service
- Branch/service: British Army
- Years of service: 1915–1919; 1920–1923; 1939 (as Territorial)
- Rank: Major
- Unit: King's Royal Rifle Corps; Durham Light Infantry
- Battles/wars: First World War; Battle of the Somme; Battle of Messines; Battle of Passchendaele; Operation Michael; Hundred Days Offensive
- Awards: Military Cross; British War Medal; Victory Medal

Robert Anthony Eden MC, 1st Earl of Avon (12 June 1897 – 14 January 1977), was a British statesman, diplomat and military officer who served as Prime Minister of the United Kingdom and Leader of the Conservative Party from 1955 to 1957.

Achieving rapid promotion as a young Conservative member of Parliament, he became foreign secretary aged 38, before resigning in protest at Neville Chamberlain's appeasement policy towards Benito Mussolini's Fascist regime in Italy. He returned to that position for most of the Second World War, and held it for a third time in the early 1950s. Having been deputy to Winston Churchill for almost 15 years, Eden succeeded him as the leader of the Conservative Party and prime minister in 1955, and a month later won a general election.

Eden's reputation as a skilled diplomat was overshadowed in 1956 when the United States refused to support the Anglo-French military response to the Suez Crisis, which critics across party lines regarded as a historic setback for British foreign policy, signalling the end of British influence in the Middle East. Most historians argue that he made a series of blunders, especially not realising the depth of American opposition to military action. Two months after ordering an end to the Suez operation, he resigned as Prime Minister on grounds of ill health, and because he was widely suspected of having misled the House of Commons over the degree of collusion with France and Israel.

Eden is generally considered to be among the least successful of British prime ministers in the 20th century, although two broadly sympathetic biographies have gone some way to shifting the balance of opinion. He was the first of fifteen British prime ministers to be appointed by Queen Elizabeth II in her seventy-year reign.

== Family ==
Robert Anthony Eden was born on 12 June 1897 at Windlestone Hall, County Durham, into a conservative family of landed gentry. He was the third of four sons of Sir William Eden, 7th and 5th Baronet, and Sybil Frances Grey, a member of the prominent Grey family of Northumberland. Sir William was a former colonel and local magistrate from an old titled family. An eccentric and often foul-tempered man, he was a talented water-colourist, portraitist, and collector of Impressionists. Eden's mother had wanted to marry Francis Knollys, who later became a significant Royal adviser, but the match was forbidden by the Prince of Wales. Although she was a popular figure locally, she had a strained relationship with her children, and her profligacy ruined the family fortunes, meaning Eden's elder brother Tim had to sell Windlestone Hall in 1936. Referring to his parentage, Rab Butler would later quip that Anthony Eden — a handsome but ill-tempered man — was "half mad baronet, half beautiful woman".

One of Eden's great-grandfathers was William Iremonger, who commanded the 2nd Regiment of Foot during the Peninsular War and fought at the Battle of Vimeiro under Sir Arthur Wellesley (the later Duke of Wellington). He was also descended from Governor Sir Robert Eden, 1st Baronet, of Maryland, and, through the Calvert family of Maryland, he was connected to the ancient Roman Catholic aristocracy of the Arundell and Howard families (including the Dukes of Norfolk), as well as Anglican families including the earls of Carlisle, Effingham and Suffolk. The Calverts had converted to the Established Church early in the 18th century to regain the proprietorship of Maryland. He also had some Danish (the Schaffalitzky de Muckadell family) and Norwegian (the Bie family) descent. Eden was once amused to learn that one of his ancestors had, like Churchill's ancestor the Duke of Marlborough, been the lover of Barbara Castlemaine.

There was speculation for many years that Eden's biological father was the politician and man of letters George Wyndham, but this is considered impossible as Wyndham was in South Africa at the time of Eden's conception. Eden's mother was rumoured to have had an affair with Wyndham. His mother and Wyndham exchanged affectionate communications in 1896 but Wyndham was an infrequent visitor to Windlestone and probably did not reciprocate Sybil's feelings. Eden was amused by the rumours but, according to his biographer Robert Rhodes James, probably did not believe them. He did not resemble his siblings, but his father Sir William attributed this to his being "a Grey, not an Eden".

Eden had an elder brother, John, who was killed in action in 1914, and a younger brother, Nicholas, who was killed when the battlecruiser HMS Indefatigable blew up and sank at the Battle of Jutland in 1916.

== Early life ==
=== School ===
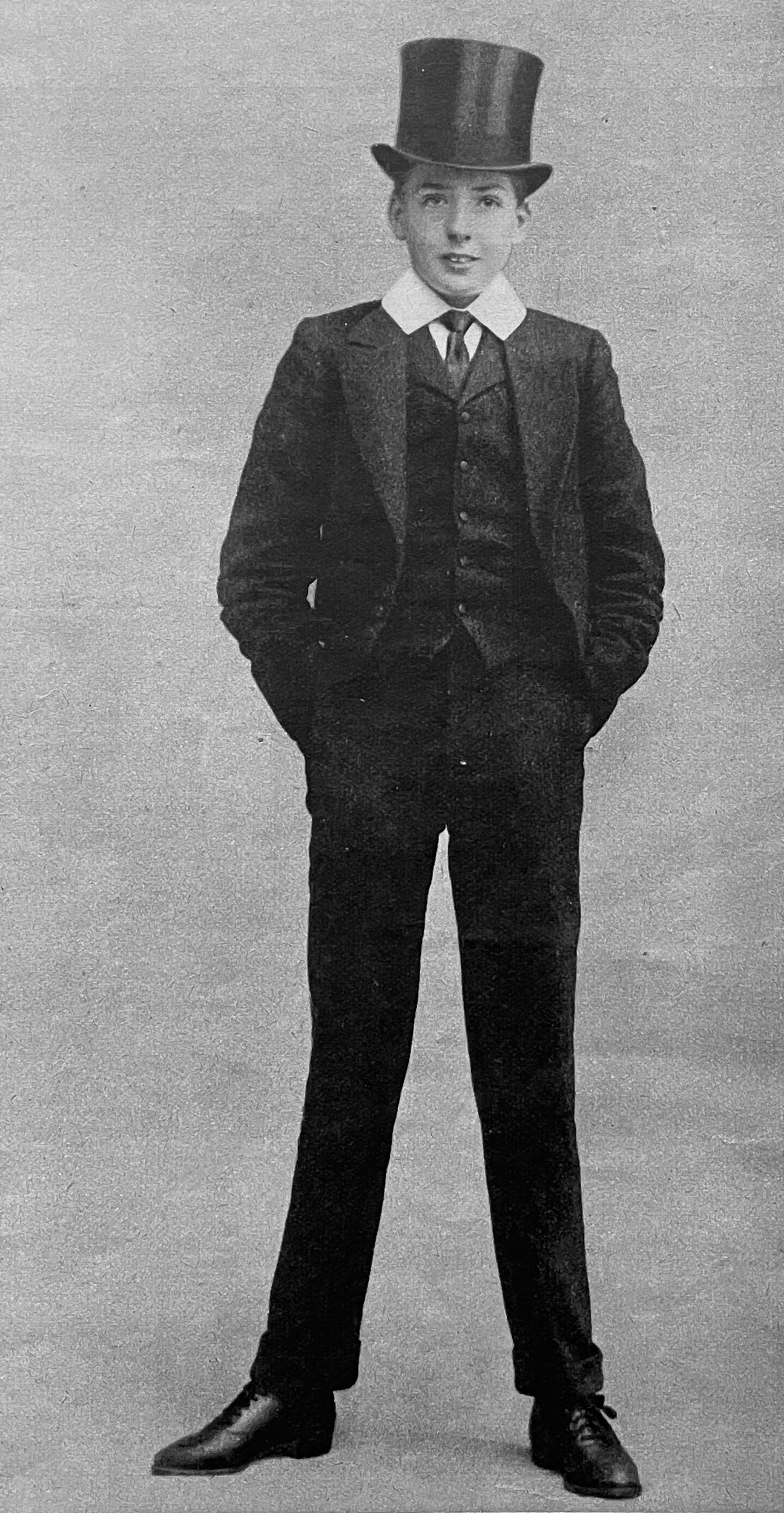
Anthony Eden aged 14 in 1911, in his first term at Eton College

Eden was educated at two independent schools. He attended Sandroyd School in Surrey from 1907 to 1910, where he excelled in languages. He then started at Eton College in January 1911. There, he won a Divinity prize and excelled at cricket, rugby and rowing, winning House colours in the last.

Eden learned French and German on continental holidays and, as a child, is said to have spoken French better than English. Although Eden was able to converse with Adolf Hitler in German in February 1934 and with Chinese Premier Zhou Enlai in French at Geneva in 1954, he preferred, out of a sense of professionalism, to have interpreters translate at formal meetings.

Although Eden later claimed to have had no interest in politics until the early 1920s, his biographer writes that his teenage letters and diaries "only really come to life" when discussing the subject. He was a strong, partisan Conservative, thinking his protectionist father "a fool" in November 1912 for trying to block his free-trade supporting uncle from a Parliamentary candidacy. He rejoiced in the defeat of Charles Masterman at a by-election in May 1914 and once astonished his mother on a train journey by telling her the MP and the size of his majority for each constituency through which they passed. By 1914 he was a member of the Eton Society ("Pop").

=== First World War ===
During the First World War, Eden's elder brother, Lieutenant John Eden, was killed in action on 17 October 1914, at the age of 26, while serving with the 12th (Prince of Wales's Royal) Lancers. He is buried in Larch Wood (Railway Cutting) Commonwealth War Graves Commission Cemetery in Belgium. Their uncle Robin was later shot down and captured whilst serving with the Royal Flying Corps.

Volunteering for service in the British Army, like many others of his generation, Eden served with the 21st (Service) Battalion, King's Royal Rifle Corps (Yeoman Rifles) (KRRC), a Kitchener's Army unit, initially recruited mainly from County Durham country labourers, who were increasingly replaced by Londoners after losses at the Somme in mid-1916. He was commissioned as a temporary second lieutenant on 2 November 1915 (antedated to 29 September 1915). His battalion transferred to the Western Front on 4 May 1916 as part of the 41st Division. On 31 May 1916, Eden's younger brother, Midshipman William Nicholas Eden, was killed in action, aged 16, on board HMS Indefatigable during the Battle of Jutland. He is commemorated on the Plymouth Naval Memorial. His brother-in-law, Lord Brooke, was wounded during the war.

One summer night in 1916, near Ploegsteert, Eden had to lead a small raid into an enemy trench to kill or capture enemy soldiers to identify the enemy units opposite. He and his men were pinned down in no man's land under enemy fire, his sergeant seriously wounded in the leg. Eden sent one man back to British lines to fetch another man and a stretcher, and he and three others carried the wounded sergeant back with, as he later put it in his memoirs, a "chilly feeling down our spines", unsure whether the Germans had not seen them in the dark or were chivalrously declining to fire. He omitted to mention that he had been awarded the Military Cross (MC) for the incident, of which he made little mention in his political career.

On 18 September 1916, after the Battle of Flers-Courcelette (part of the Battle of the Somme), he wrote to his mother, "I have seen things lately that I am not likely to forget." On 3 October, he was appointed an adjutant, with the rank of temporary lieutenant for the duration of that appointment. At the age of 19, he was the youngest adjutant on the Western Front.

Eden's MC was gazetted in the 1917 Birthday Honours list. His battalion fought at Messines Ridge in June 1917. On 1 July 1917 Eden was confirmed as a temporary lieutenant, relinquishing his appointment as adjutant three days later. His battalion fought in the first few days of the Third Battle of Ypres (31 July – 4 August). Between 20 and 23 September 1917 his battalion spent a few days on coastal defence on the Franco-Belgian border.

On 19 November Eden was transferred to the General Staff as a General Staff Officer Grade 3 (GSO3), with the temporary rank of captain. He served at Second Army HQ between mid-November 1917 and 8 March 1918, missing out on service in Italy (as the 41st Division had been transferred there after the Italian Second Army was defeated at the Battle of Caporetto). Eden returned to the Western Front as a major German offensive was clearly imminent, only for his former battalion to be disbanded to help alleviate the British Army's acute manpower shortage. Although David Lloyd George, then the British prime minister, was one of the few politicians of whom Eden reported frontline soldiers speaking highly, he wrote to his sister (23 December 1917) in disgust at his "wait and see twaddle" in declining to extend conscription to Ireland.

In March 1918, during the German spring offensive, he was stationed near La Fère on the Oise, opposite Adolf Hitler, as he learned at a conference in 1935. At one point, when brigade HQ was bombed by German aircraft, his companion told him, "There now, you have had your first taste of the next war." On 26 May 1918, he was appointed brigade major of the 198th Infantry Brigade, part of the 66th Division. At the age of 20, Eden was the youngest brigade major in the British Army.

He considered standing for Parliament at the end of the war, but the general election was called too early for that to be possible. After the Armistice with Germany, he spent the winter of 1918–1919 in the Ardennes with his brigade; on 28 March 1919, he transferred to be brigade major of the 99th Infantry Brigade. Eden contemplated applying for a commission in the Regular Army, but these were very hard to come by with the army contracting so rapidly. He initially shrugged off his mother's suggestion of studying at Oxford. He also rejected the thought of becoming a barrister. His preferred career alternatives at this stage were standing for Parliament for Bishop Auckland, the Civil Service in East Africa or the Foreign Office. He was demobilised on 13 June 1919. He retained the rank of captain.

=== Oxford ===
The Uffizi Society Oxford, ca. 1920. First row standing: later Sir Henry Studholme (5th from left). Seated: Lord Balniel, later 28th Earl of Crawford (2nd from left); Ralph Dutton, later 8th Baron Sherborne (3rd from left); Anthony Eden, later Earl of Avon (4th from left); Lord David Cecil (5th from left).

Eden had dabbled in the study of Turkish with a family friend. After the war, he studied Oriental Languages (Persian and Arabic) at Christ Church, Oxford, starting in October 1919. Persian was his main and Arabic his secondary language. He studied under Richard Paset Dewhurst and David Samuel Margoliouth.

At Oxford, Eden took no part in student politics, and his main leisure interest at the time was art. Eden was in the Oxford University Dramatic Society and President of the Asiatic Society. Along with Lord David Cecil and R. E. Gathorne-Hardy he founded the Uffizi Society, of which he later became president. Possibly under the influence of his father, Eden gave a paper on Paul Cézanne, whose work was not yet widely appreciated. Eden was already collecting paintings.

In July 1920, still an undergraduate, Eden was recalled to military service as a lieutenant in the 6th Battalion of the Durham Light Infantry. In the spring of 1921, once again as a temporary captain, he commanded local defence forces at Spennymoor as serious industrial unrest seemed possible. He again relinquished his commission on 8 July. He graduated from Oxford in June 1922 with a Double First. He continued to serve as an officer in the Territorial Army until May 1923.

== Early political career, 1922–1931 ==
=== 1922–1924 ===
Captain Eden, as he was still known, was selected to contest Spennymoor, as a Conservative. He had initially hoped to win with some Liberal support, as the Conservatives were still supporting Lloyd George's coalition government, but by the time of the 1922 general election in November, it was clear that the surge in the Labour vote made that unlikely. His main sponsor was the Marquess of Londonderry, a local coal owner. The seat went from Liberal to Labour.

Eden's father had died on 20 February 1915. As a younger son, he had inherited capital of £7,675 and in 1922 he had a private income of £706 after tax (approximately £375,000 and £35,000 at 2014 prices).

Eden read the writings of Lord Curzon, and was hoping to emulate him by entering politics with a view to specialising in foreign affairs. Eden married Beatrice Beckett in the autumn of 1923, and after a two-day honeymoon in Essex, he was selected to fight Warwick and Leamington for a by-election in November 1923. His Labour opponent, Daisy Greville, Countess of Warwick, was, by coincidence, his sister Elfrida's mother-in-law, and also mother to his wife's step-mother, Marjorie Blanche Eve Beckett, née Greville. On 16 November 1923, during the by-election campaign, Parliament was dissolved for the December 1923 general election. He was elected to Parliament at the age of twenty-six.

The first Labour Government, under Ramsay MacDonald, took office in January 1924. Eden's maiden speech (19 February 1924) was a controversial attack on Labour's defence policy, and was heckled; he was thereafter careful to speak only after deep preparation. He later reprinted the speech in the collection Foreign Affairs (1939) to give the impression that he had been a consistent advocate of air strength. Eden admired H. H. Asquith, then in his final year in the Commons, for his lucidity and brevity. On 1 April 1924 Eden spoke to urge Anglo-Turkish friendship and the ratification of the Treaty of Lausanne, which had been signed in July 1923.

=== 1924–1929 ===
The Conservatives returned to power at the 1924 general election. In January 1925 Eden, disappointed not to have been offered a position, went on a tour of the Middle East and met King Feisal of Iraq. Feisal reminded him of the "Czar of Russia & (I) suspect that his fate may be similar" (a similar fate indeed befell the Iraqi Royal Family in 1958). During a visit to Pahlavi Iran he inspected the Abadan Refinery, which he likened to "a Swansea on a small scale".

Eden was appointed Parliamentary Private Secretary to Godfrey Locker-Lampson, Under-Secretary at the Home Office (17 February 1925), serving under Home Secretary William Joynson Hicks.

In July 1925 Eden went on a second trip to Canada, Australia and India. He wrote articles for The Yorkshire Post, controlled by his father-in-law Sir Gervase Beckett, under the pseudonym "Backbencher". In September 1925 he represented the Yorkshire Post at the Imperial Conference in Melbourne.

Eden continued to be PPS to Locker-Lampson when the latter was appointed Under-Secretary at the Foreign Office in December 1925. He distinguished himself with a speech on the Middle East (21 December 1925), that called for the readjustment of Iraqi frontiers in favour of Turkey but also for a continued British mandate, rather than a "scuttle". Eden ended his speech by calling for Anglo-Turkish friendship. On 23 March 1926 he spoke to urge the League of Nations to admit Germany, which would happen the following year. In July 1926 he became PPS to the Foreign Secretary Sir Austen Chamberlain.

Besides supplementing his parliamentary income of around £300 a year at that time by writing and journalism, he published a book about his travels, Places in the Sun in 1926 that was highly critical of the detrimental effect of socialism on Australia and to which Stanley Baldwin wrote a foreword.

In November 1928, with Austen Chamberlain away on a voyage to recover his health, Eden had to speak for the government in a debate on a recent Anglo-French naval agreement in reply to Ramsay MacDonald, then Leader of the Opposition. According to Austen Chamberlain, he would have been promoted to his first ministerial job, Under-Secretary at the Foreign Office, if the Conservatives had won the 1929 general election.

=== 1929–1931 ===
The 1929 general election was the only time that Eden received less than 50% of the vote at Warwick. After the Conservative defeat, he joined a progressive group of younger politicians consisting of Oliver Stanley, William Ormsby-Gore and the future Speaker W.S. "Shakes" Morrison. Another member was Noel Skelton, who had before his death coined the phrase "property-owning democracy", which Eden was later to popularise as a Conservative Party aspiration. Eden advocated co-partnership in industry between managers and workers, whom he wanted to be given shares.

In opposition between 1929 and 1931, Eden worked as a City broker for Harry Lucas, a firm that was eventually absorbed into S. G. Warburg & Co.

== Foreign Affairs Minister, 1931–1935 ==
In August 1931, Eden held his first ministerial office as Under-Secretary for Foreign Affairs in Prime Minister Ramsay MacDonald's National Government. Initially, the office was held by Lord Reading (in the House of Lords), but Sir John Simon held the position from November 1931.

Like many of his generation who had served in the First World War, Eden was strongly antiwar, and he strove to work through the League of Nations to preserve European peace. The government proposed measures superseding the post-war Versailles Treaty to allow Germany to rearm (albeit replacing its small professional army with a short-service militia) and to reduce French armaments. Winston Churchill criticised the policy sharply in the House of Commons on 23 March 1933, opposing "undue" French disarmament as this might require Britain to take action to enforce peace under the 1925 Locarno Treaty. Eden, replying for the government, dismissed Churchill's speech as exaggerated and unconstructive and commented that land disarmament had yet to make the same progress as naval disarmament at the Washington and London Treaties and arguing that French disarmament was needed to "secure for Europe that period of appeasement which is needed". Eden's speech was met with approval by the House of Commons. Neville Chamberlain commented shortly afterwards, "That young man is coming along rapidly; not only can he make a good speech but he has a good head and what advice he gives is listened to by the Cabinet".

Eden later wrote that in the early 1930s, the word "appeasement" was still used in its correct sense (from the Oxford English Dictionary) of seeking to settle strife. Only later in the decade would it come to acquire a pejorative meaning of acceding to bullying demands.

He was appointed Lord Privy Seal in January 1934, a position that was combined with the newly created office of Minister for League of Nations Affairs. As Lord Privy Seal, Eden was sworn of the Privy Council in the 1934 Birthday Honours.

On 25 March 1935, accompanying Sir John Simon, Eden met Hitler in Berlin and raised a weak protest after Hitler restored conscription against the Versailles Treaty. The same month, Eden also met Joseph Stalin and Maxim Litvinov in Moscow.

He entered the cabinet for the first time when Stanley Baldwin formed his third administration in June 1935. Eden later came to recognise that peace could not be maintained by appeasement of Nazi Germany and Fascist Italy. He privately opposed the policy of the Foreign Secretary, Sir Samuel Hoare, of trying to appease Italy during its invasion of Abyssinia (now Ethiopia) in 1935. After Hoare resigned after the failure of the Hoare-Laval Pact, Eden succeeded him as Foreign Secretary. When Eden had his first audience with King George V, the King is said to have remarked, "No more coals to Newcastle, no more Hoares to Paris".

In 1935 Baldwin sent Eden on a two-day visit to see Hitler, with whom he dined twice. Litvinov's biographer John Holroyd-Doveton believed that Eden shares with Molotov the experience of being the only people to have had dinner with Hitler, Churchill, Roosevelt and Stalin although not on the same occasion. Hitler never had dinner with any of the other three leaders, and as far as is known, Stalin never saw Hitler.

Attlee was convinced that public opinion could stop Hitler, saying in a speech in the House of Commons:

"We believe in a League system in which the whole world would be ranged against an aggressor. If it is shown that someone is proposing to break the peace let us bring the whole world opinion against her".

However, Eden was more realistic and correctly predicted:

"Hitler could only be stopped. There may be the only course of action open to us to join with those powers who are members of the League in affirming our faith in that institution and to uphold the principles of the Covenant. It may be the spectacle of the great powers of the League reaffirming their intentions to collaborate more closely than ever is not only the sole means of bringing home to Germany that the inevitable effect of persisting in her present policy will be to consolidate against her all those nations which believe in collective security but will also tend to give confidence to those less powerful nations which through fear of Germany's growing strength might well otherwise be drawn into her orbit".

Eden proceeded to Moscow for talks with Stalin and Soviet Minister Litvinov, Most of the British cabinet feared of the spread of Bolshevism to Britain and hated the Soviets, but Eden went with an open mind and had a respect for Stalin:

"(Stalin's) personality made itself felt without exaggeration. He had natural good manners, perhaps a Georgian inheritance. Though I knew the man was without mercy, I respected the quality of his mind and even felt a sympathy I have never been able to analyse. Perhaps it was because of the pragmatic approach. I cannot believe he had any affinity to Marx. Certainly no one could have been less doctrinaire".

Eden felt sure most of his colleagues would feel unenthusiastic about any favourable report on the Soviet Union but felt certain to be correct.

The representatives of both governments were happy to note that as a result of a full and frank exchange of views, there is at present no conflict of interest between them on any of the major issues of international policy, which provided a firm foundation between them in the cause of peace. Eden stated when he sent the communiqué to his government, he thought that his colleagues would be "Unenthusiastic, I am sure".

John Holroyd-Doveton argued that Eden would be proved right. Not only was the French army defeated by the German army, but France broke its treaty with Britain by seeking an armistice with Germany. In contrast, the Red Army finally defeated the Wehrmacht.

At that stage in his career, Eden was considered as something of a leader of fashion. He regularly wore a Homburg hat, which became known in Britain as an "Anthony Eden".

== Foreign Secretary and resignation, 1935–1938 ==
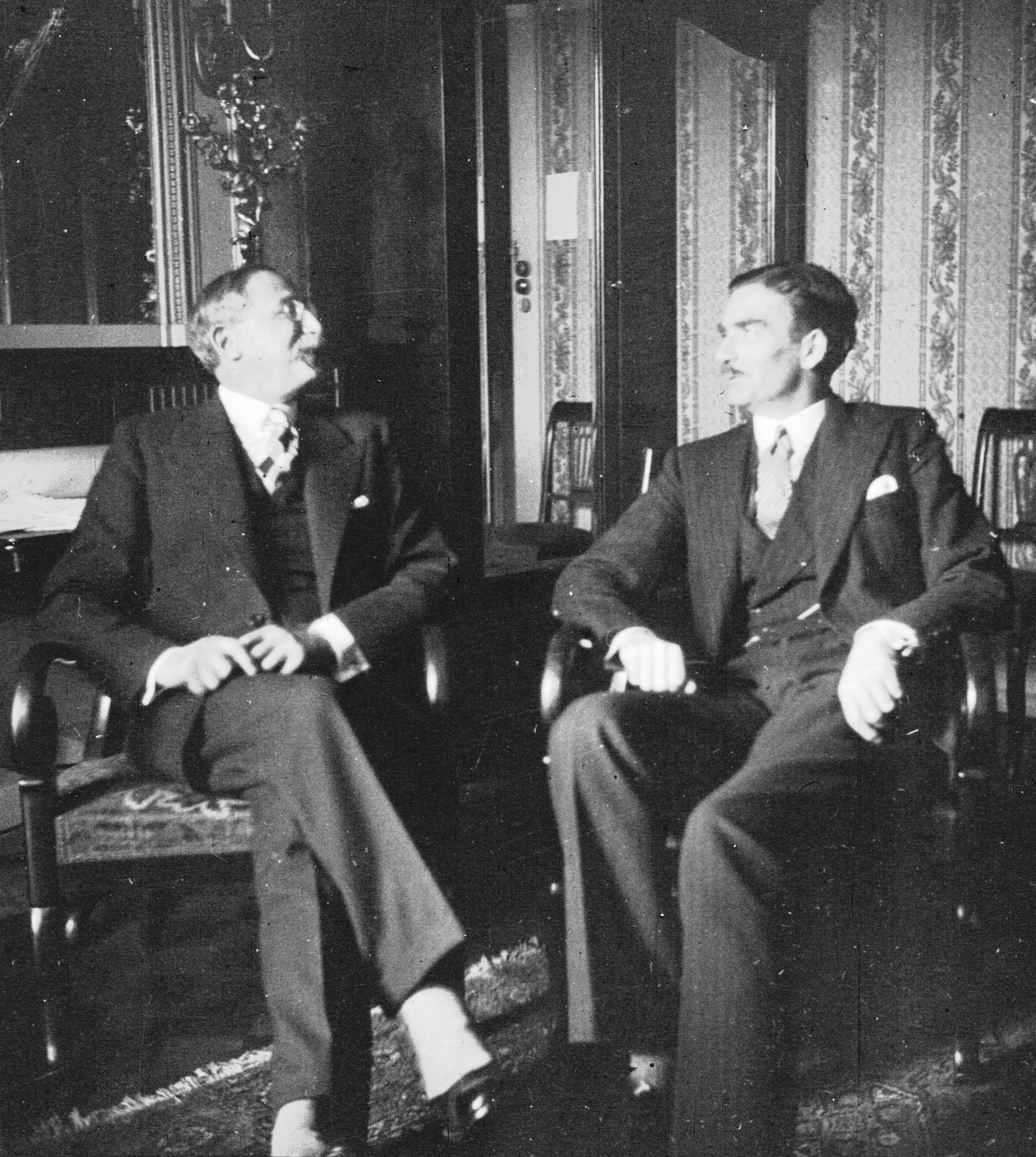
Eden with French Prime Minister Léon Blum (left) in Geneva in 1936

Eden became Foreign Secretary after Samuel Hoare had resigned after the collapse of the Hoare–Laval Pact. Britain had to adjust its foreign policy to face the rise of the fascist powers of Nazi Germany and Hitler as well as Italian fascism and Mussolini. He supported the policy of non-interference in the Spanish Civil War through conferences such as the Nyon Conference and supported Prime Minister Neville Chamberlain and his National Government in their efforts to preserve peace through seemingly reasonable concessions to Nazi Germany.

The Italian-Ethiopian War was brewing, and Eden tried in vain to persuade Mussolini to submit the dispute to the League of Nations. The Italian dictator scoffed at Eden publicly as "the best dressed fool in Europe". Eden did not protest when Britain and France failed to oppose Hitler's reoccupation of the Rhineland on 7 March 1936. When the French government (Sarraut II government) requested a meeting with a view to some kind of military action in response to Hitler's occupation, Eden's statement firmly ruled out any military assistance to France.

Eden resigned on 20 February 1938 as a public protest against Chamberlain's policy of coming to friendly terms with Fascist Italy. Eden used secret intelligence reports to conclude that the Mussolini regime in Italy posed a threat to Britain. In a 1967 interview, Eden explained his decision to resign: "we had an agreement with Mussolini about the Mediterranean and Spain, which he was violating by sending troops to Spain, and Chamberlain wanted to have another agreement. I thought Mussolini should honour the first one before we negotiated for the second. I was trying to fight a delaying action for Britain, and I could not go along with Chamberlain's policy".

In 1938, when Neville Chamberlain returned from Munich to Parliament with his and Hitler's signature on the Munich peace agreement, most of the MPs in the house rose in tumultuous acclamation. Eden walked out of the house pale with shame and anger. A few others remained seated: Churchill (who initially rose to catch the Speaker's eye to speak), Leo Amery, Vyvyan Adams, and Harold Nicolson.

He became a Conservative dissenter, leading a group that Conservative whip David Margesson called the "Glamour Boys". Meanwhile, the leading anti-appeaser Churchill led a similar group, "The Old Guard". They were not yet allies and would not see eye-to-eye until Churchill became prime minister in 1940. There was much speculation that Eden would become a rallying point for all the disparate opponents of Chamberlain, but Eden's position declined heavily among politicians since he maintained a low profile and avoided confrontation though he opposed the Munich Agreement and abstained in the vote on it in the House of Commons. However, he remained popular in the country at large and, in later years, was often wrongly supposed to have resigned as Foreign Secretary in protest at the Munich Agreement and appeasement generally.

== Second World War ==
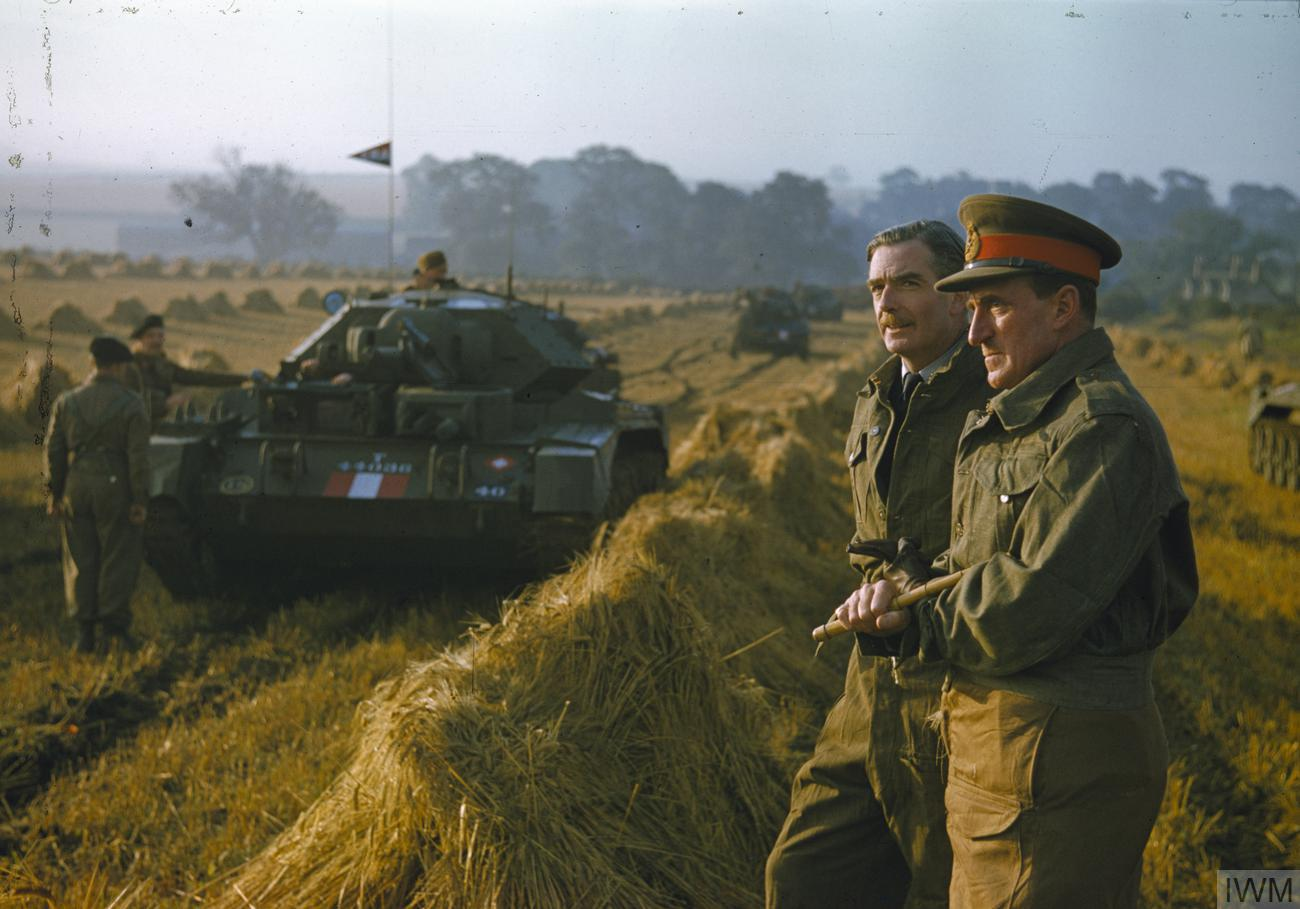
Eden and the Commander in Chief Home Forces, Bernard Paget, watching the 42nd Armoured Division exercise near Malton, North Yorkshire

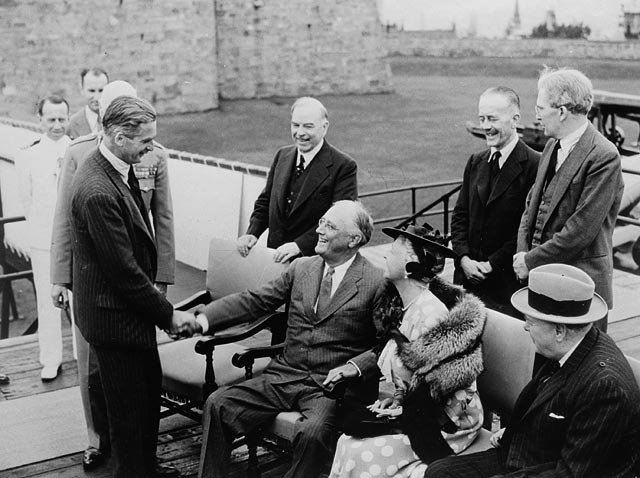
Eden with Canadian prime minister Mackenzie King and Churchill meeting US president Franklin D. Roosevelt at the Quebec Conference in 1943.

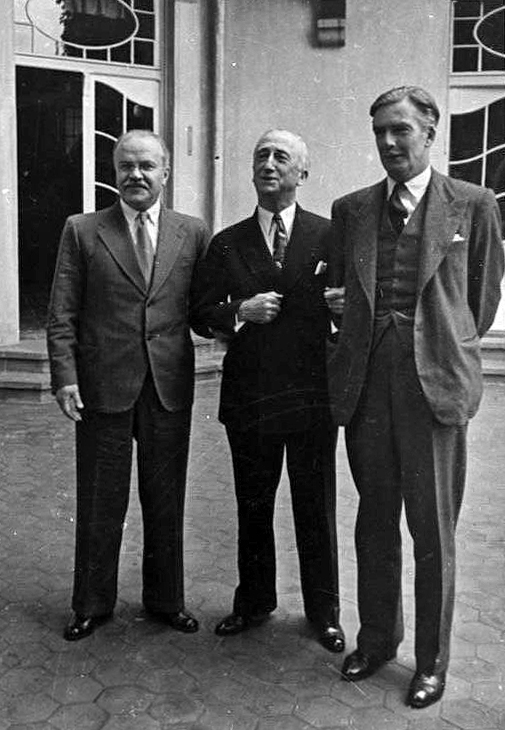
Potsdam Conference: The Foreign Ministers Vyacheslav Molotov, James F. Byrnes and Anthony Eden, July 1945.

During the last months of peace in 1939, Eden joined the Territorial Army with the rank of major, in the London Rangers motorised battalion of the King's Royal Rifle Corps and was at annual camp with them in Beaulieu, Hampshire, when he heard news of the Molotov–Ribbentrop Pact.

Two days after the outbreak of war, on 3 September 1939, Eden, unlike most Territorials, did not mobilise for active service. Instead, he returned to Chamberlain's government as Secretary of State for Dominion Affairs and he visited Mandatory Palestine in February 1940 to inspect the Second Australian Imperial Force. However, he was not in the War Cabinet. As a result, he was not a candidate for prime minister when Chamberlain resigned on 10 May 1940 after the Narvik Debate and Churchill became prime minister. Churchill appointed Eden Secretary of State for War.

At the end of 1940, Eden returned to the Foreign Office and became a member of the executive committee of the Political Warfare Executive in 1941. Although he was one of Churchill's closest confidants, his role in wartime was restricted because Churchill himself conducted the most important negotiations, those with Franklin D. Roosevelt and Stalin, but Eden served loyally as Churchill's lieutenant. In December 1941 he travelled by ship to the Soviet Union, where he met Stalin and surveyed the battlefields upon which the Soviets had successfully defended Moscow from the German Army attack in Operation Barbarossa.

Nevertheless, he was in charge of handling most of the relations between Britain and the Free French leader, Charles de Gaulle, during the last years of the war. Eden was often both critical of the emphasis Churchill put on the special relationship with the United States and disappointed by the American treatment of its British allies.

In 1942 Eden was given the additional role of Leader of the House of Commons. He was considered for various other major jobs during and after the war, including Commander-in-Chief Middle East in 1942 (which would have been a very unusual appointment as Eden was a civilian; General Harold Alexander would be appointed), Viceroy of India in 1943 (General Archibald Wavell was appointed to this job) or Secretary-General of the newly formed United Nations Organisation in 1945. In 1943, with the revelation of the Katyn massacre, Eden refused to help the Polish government-in-exile. Eden supported the idea of post-war expulsion of ethnic Germans from Czechoslovakia.

In early 1943 Eden blocked a request from the Bulgarian authorities to aid with deporting part of the Jewish population from newly acquired Bulgarian territories to the British territory of Mandatory Palestine. After his refusal, some of the people were transported to Treblinka extermination camp in Nazi-occupied Poland. That same spring, Eden visited Washington, D.C., for high-level talks with Roosevelt, Secretary of State Cordell Hull, and Harry Hopkins, where they discussed anticipated postwar issues, including the occupation and future political structure of Germany.

In 1944 Eden went to Moscow to negotiate with the Soviet Union at the Tolstoy Conference. Eden also opposed the Morgenthau Plan to deindustrialise Germany. After the Stalag Luft III murders, he vowed in the Commons to bring the perpetrators of the crime to "exemplary justice", which led to a successful manhunt after the war by the Royal Air Force's Special Investigation Branch. During the Yalta Conference (February 1945) he pressed the Soviet Union and the United States to allow France a zone of occupation in post-war Germany.

Eden's eldest son, Pilot officer Simon Gascoigne Eden, went missing in action and was later declared dead; he was serving as a navigator with the RAF in Burma in June 1945. There was a close bond between Eden and Simon, and Simon's death was a great personal shock to his father. Mrs Eden reportedly reacted to the loss of her son differently, which led to a breakdown in the marriage. De Gaulle wrote him a personal letter of condolence in French.

In 1945 he was mentioned by Halvdan Koht among seven candidates who were qualified for the Nobel Peace Prize. However, he did not explicitly nominate any of them. The person who was actually nominated was Cordell Hull.

== Postwar, 1945–1955 ==
=== In opposition, 1945–1951 ===
After the Labour Party won the 1945 election, Eden went into opposition as Deputy Leader of the Conservative Party. Many felt that Churchill should have retired and allowed Eden to become party leader, but Churchill refused to consider the idea. As early as the spring of 1946, Eden openly asked Churchill to retire in his favour. He was in any case depressed by the end of his first marriage and the death of his eldest son. Churchill was, in many ways, only "part-time Leader of the Opposition" because of his many journeys abroad and his literary work, and left the day-to-day work largely to Eden, who was largely regarded as lacking a sense of party politics and contact with the common man. In the opposition years, however, he developed some knowledge about domestic affairs and created the idea of a "property-owning-democracy", which Margaret Thatcher's government attempted to achieve decades later. His domestic agenda is overall considered to be centre-left.

During the Palestine Emergency, Eden narrowly avoided assassination by the Stern Gang via a letter bomb sent by Betty Knouth and Yaakov Levstein. Eden carried a letter bomb in his suitcase for a whole day, thinking it was a Whitehall pamphlet that he would read later in the day. He only realized it was a bomb after being warned by the police, who were informed by MI5. In September 1947, a Belgian court sentenced Knouth to one year in prison and Levstein to eight months in prison for illegally transporting explosives with intent to commit a felony.

=== Return to government, 1951–1955 ===
In 1951 the Conservatives returned to office and Eden became Foreign Secretary for a third time. Churchill was largely a figurehead in the government, and Eden had effective control of British foreign policy for the second time, with the decline of the empire and the intensifying of the Cold War. Churchill wanted to appoint Eden Deputy Prime Minister as well as Foreign Secretary, but King George VI objected and said that the office did not exist in the British constitution and might interfere with his ability to appoint a successor. Thus, Eden was not appointed Deputy Prime Minister. However, he still considered himself Churchill's "second-in-command" and had been regarded as Churchill's "crown prince" since 1942.

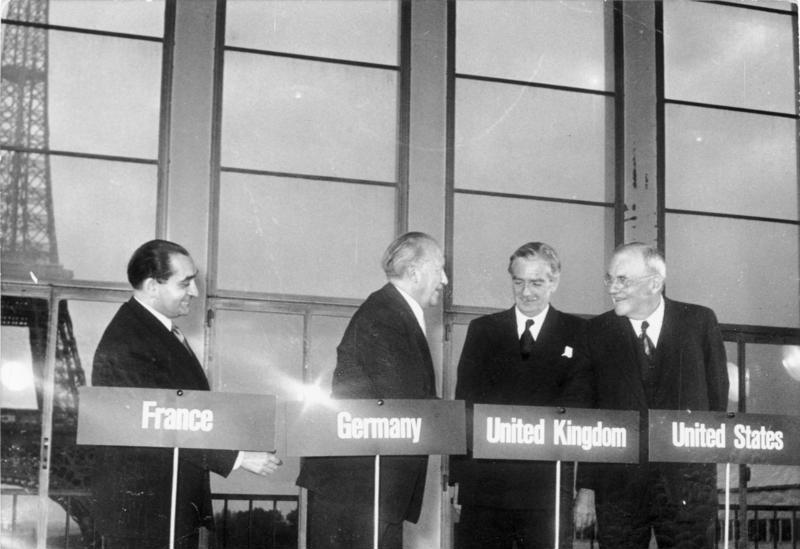
Negotiations in London and Paris in 1954 ended the allied occupation of West Germany and allowed for its rearmament as a NATO member.

Eden's biographer Richard Lamb said that Eden bullied Churchill into going back on commitments to European unity made in opposition. The truth appears to be more complex. Britain was still a world power or at least trying to be one in 1945–55, with the concept of sovereignty not as discredited as on the Continent. The United States encouraged moves towards European federalism so that it could withdraw troops and have the Germans rearmed under supervision. Eden was less Atlanticist than Churchill and had little time for European federalism. He wanted firm alliances with France and other Western European powers to contain Germany. Half of British trade was then with the sterling area and only a quarter with Western Europe.

Despite later talk of "lost opportunities", even Macmillan, who had been an active member of the European Movement after the war, acknowledged in February 1952 that Britain's special relationship with the United States and the Commonwealth would prevent it from joining a federal Europe at the time. Eden was also irritated by Churchill's hankering for a summit meeting with the Soviet Union in 1953 after Stalin's death. Eden became seriously ill from a series of botched bile duct operations in April 1953 that nearly killed him. After that, he had frequent bouts of poor physical health and psychological depression. Despite the ending of the British Raj in India, British interest in the Middle East remained strong. Britain had treaty relations with Jordan and Iraq and was the protecting power for Kuwait and the Trucial States, the colonial power in Aden, and the occupying power in the Suez Canal. Many right-wing Conservative MPs, organised in the so-called Suez Group, sought to retain the imperial role, but economic pressures made maintenance of it increasingly difficult.

Britain sought to maintain its huge military base in the Suez Canal zone and, in the face of Egyptian resentment, to further develop its alliance with Iraq, and the hope was that the Americans would assist Britain, possibly financially. While the Americans co-operated with the British in the 28 Mordad coup against the Mosaddegh government in Iran after it had nationalised British oil interests, the Americans developed their own relations in the region and took a positive view of the Egyptian Free Officers and developed friendly relations with Saudi Arabia. Britain was eventually forced to withdraw from the canal zone, and the Baghdad Pact security treaty was not supported by the United States, which left Eden vulnerable to the charge of having failed to maintain British prestige.

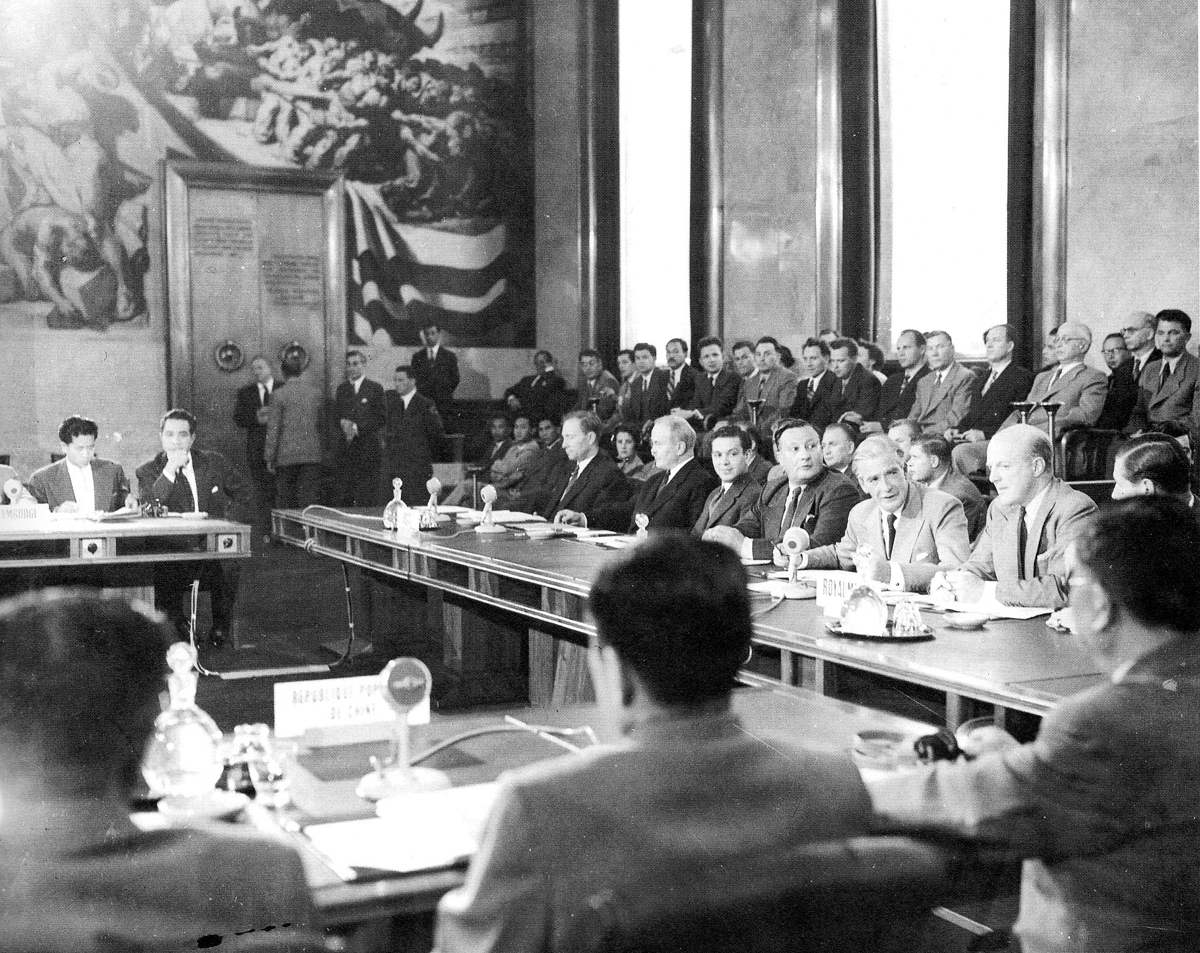
Geneva Conference, 21 July 1954. Last plenary session on Indochina in the Palais des Nations.

Eden had grave misgivings about American foreign policy under Secretary of State John Foster Dulles and President Dwight D. Eisenhower. As early as March 1953, Eisenhower was concerned at the escalating costs of defence and the increase of state power that it would bring. Eden was irked by Dulles's policy of "brinkmanship", the display of muscle, in relations with the communist world. In particular, both had heated exchanges with one another regarding the proposed American aerial strike operation (Vulture) to try to save the beleaguered French Union garrison at the Battle of Dien Bien Phu in early 1954. The operation was cancelled, in part, because of Eden's refusal to commit to it for fear of Chinese intervention and ultimately a third world war. Dulles then walked out early in the Geneva Conference talks and was critical of the American decision not to sign it. Nevertheless, the success of the conference ranked as the outstanding achievement of Eden's third term in the Foreign Office. During the summer and autumn of 1954, the Anglo-Egyptian agreement to withdraw all British forces from Egypt was also negotiated and ratified.

There were concerns that if the European Defence Community was not ratified as it wanted, the United States might withdraw into defending only the Western Hemisphere, but recent documentary evidence confirms that the US intended to withdraw troops from Europe anyway even if the EDC was ratified. After the French National Assembly rejected the EDC in August 1954, Eden offered a viable alternative. Between 11 and 17 September, with the help of the Foreign Office's Frank Roberts, he visited every major West European capital to negotiate the rearmament and NATO membership of West Germany. The intervention was a diplomatic triumph that marked a major step in the consolidation of the Western bloc.

In October 1954 Eden was appointed to the Order of the Garter and became Sir Anthony Eden.

== Prime Minister, 1955–1957 ==
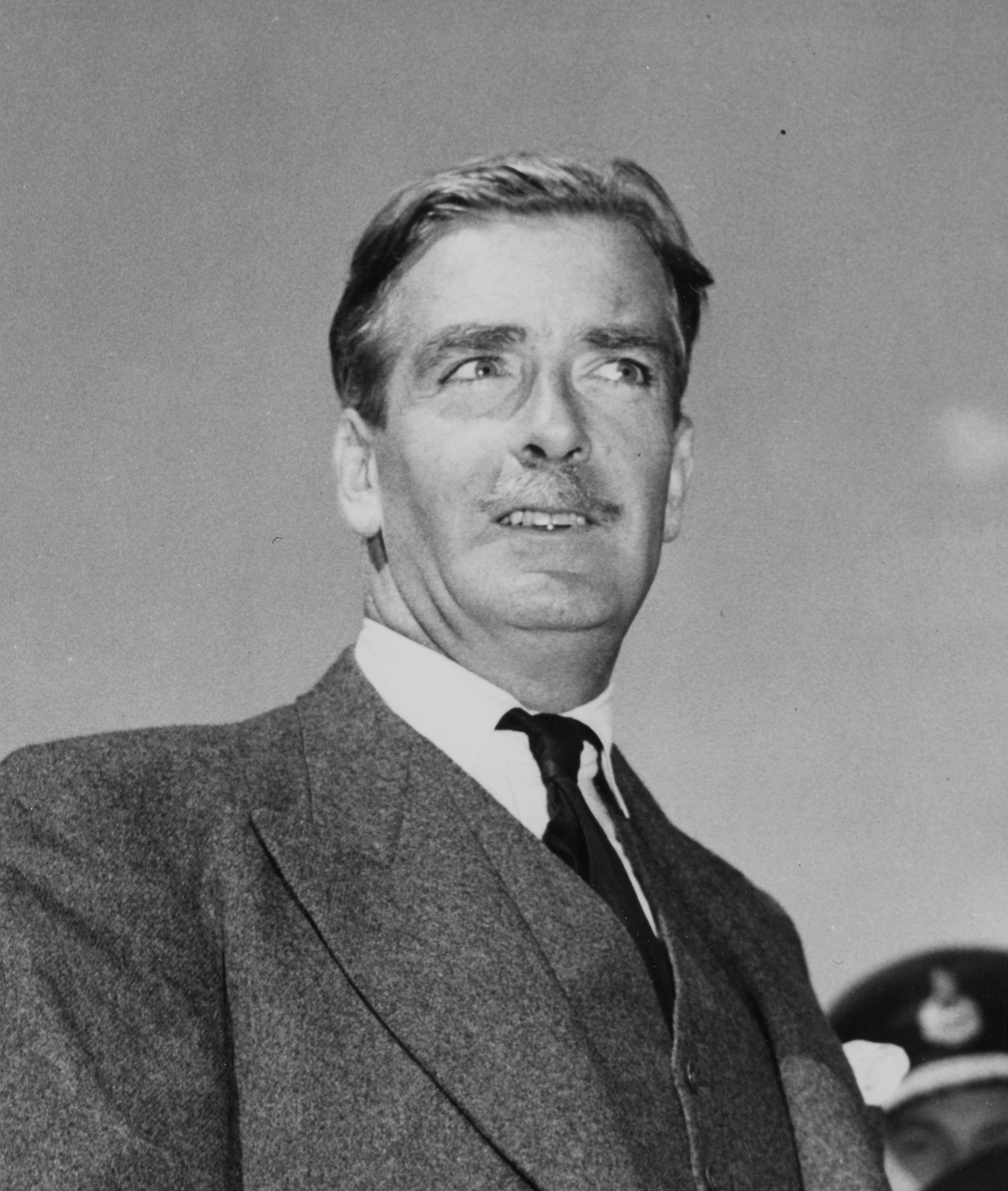
- Premiership of Anthony Eden; 6 April 1955 – 9 January 1957
- Monarch: Elizabeth II
- Cabinet: Eden ministry
- Party: Conservative
- Election: 1955
- Seat: 10 Downing Street
- Coat of arms of HM Government

In April 1955 Churchill retired, and Eden succeeded him as prime minister. Eden was well known due to his long wartime service and his public profile as a senior statesman. His statement, “Peace comes first, always,” reflected his emphasis on diplomacy and was widely reported at the time.

On taking office he immediately called a general election for 26 May 1955, at which he increased the Conservative majority from seventeen to sixty, an increase in majority that broke a ninety-year record for any British government. This election remains the last in which the Conservatives won the majority share of the votes in Scotland. However, Eden had never held a domestic portfolio and had little experience in economic matters. He left these areas to his lieutenants such as Rab Butler, and concentrated largely on foreign policy, forming a close relationship with US President Dwight Eisenhower. Eden's attempts to maintain overall control of the Foreign Office drew widespread criticism.

Eden has the distinction of being the British prime minister to oversee the lowest unemployment figures of the post-Second World War era, with unemployment standing at just over 215,000—barely one per cent of the workforce—in July 1955.

=== Suez (1956) ===
The alliance with the US proved not universal, however, when in July 1956 Gamal Abdel Nasser, President of Egypt, nationalised the Suez Canal, following the withdrawal of Anglo-American funding for the Aswan Dam. Eden believed the nationalisation was in violation of the Anglo-Egyptian treaty that Nasser had signed with the British and French governments in October 1954. This view was shared by Labour leader Hugh Gaitskell and Liberal leader Jo Grimond. In 1956 the Suez Canal was of vital importance since over two-thirds of the oil supplies of Western Europe (60 million tons annually) passed through it on 15,000 ships a year, one-third of them British; three-quarters of all Canal shipping belonged to NATO countries. Britain's total oil reserve at the time of the nationalisation was enough for only six weeks. The Soviet Union was certain to veto any sanctions against Nasser at the United Nations. Britain and a conference of other nations met in London following the nationalisation in an attempt to resolve the crisis through diplomatic means. However, the Eighteen Nations Proposals, including an offer of Egyptian representation on the board of the Suez Canal Company and a share of profits, were rejected by Nasser. Eden feared that Nasser intended to form an Arab Alliance that would threaten to cut off oil supplies to Europe and, in conjunction with France, decided Nasser should be removed from power.

Most people believed that Nasser was acting from legitimate patriotic concerns and the nationalisation was determined by the Foreign Office to be deliberately provocative but not illegal. The Attorney General, Sir Reginald Manningham-Buller, was not asked for his opinion officially but made known his view that the government's contemplated armed strike against Egypt would be unlawful.

Anthony Nutting recalled that Eden told him, "What's all this nonsense about isolating Nasser or 'neutralising' him as you call it? I want him destroyed, can't you understand? I want him murdered, and if you and the Foreign Office don't agree, then you'd better come to the cabinet and explain why." When Nutting pointed out that they had no alternative government to replace Nasser, Eden apparently replied, "I don't give a damn if there's anarchy and chaos in Egypt." At a private meeting at Downing Street on 16 October 1956 Eden showed several ministers a plan submitted two days earlier by France. Israel would invade Egypt, Britain and France would give an ultimatum telling both sides to stop and, when one refused, send in forces to enforce the ultimatum, separate the two sides – and occupy the Canal and get rid of Nasser. When Nutting suggested the Americans should be consulted, Eden replied, "I will not bring the Americans into this ... Dulles has done enough damage as it is. This has nothing to do with the Americans. We and the French must decide what to do and we alone." Eden openly admitted his view of the crisis was shaped by his experiences in the two world wars, writing, "We are all marked to some extent by the stamp of our generation. Mine is that of the assassination in Sarajevo and all that flowed from it. It is impossible to read the record now and not feel that we had a responsibility for always being a lap behind ... Always a lap behind, a fatal lap."

As Cyprus had no deep-water harbours, Malta, several days' sailing from Egypt, would have to be the main concentration point for an invasion fleet, if the Libyan government would not permit a land invasion from its territory. Eden initially considered using British forces in the Kingdom of Libya to regain the Canal, but then decided this risked inflaming Arab opinion. Unlike French prime minister Guy Mollet, who saw regaining the Canal as the primary objective, Eden believed the real need was to remove Nasser from office. He hoped that if the Egyptian army was swiftly and humiliatingly defeated by the Anglo-French forces the Egyptian people would rise up against Nasser. Eden told Field Marshal Bernard Montgomery that the overall aim of the mission was simply, "To knock Nasser off his perch." In the absence of a popular uprising, Eden and Mollet would say that Egyptian forces were incapable of defending their country and therefore Anglo-French forces would have to return to guard the canal.

Eden believed that if Nasser were seen to get away with seizing the canal then Egypt and other Arab countries might move closer to the Soviet Union. At that time, the Middle East accounted for 80–90 percent of Western Europe's oil supply. Other Middle East countries might also be encouraged to nationalise their oil industries. The invasion, he contended at the time, and again in a 1967 interview, was aimed at maintaining the sanctity of international agreements and at preventing future unilateral denunciation of treaties. Eden was energetic during the crisis in using the media, including the BBC, to incite public opinion to support his views of the need to overthrow Nasser. In September 1956 a plan was drawn up to reduce the flow of water in the Nile by using dams in an attempt to damage Nasser's position. However, the plan was abandoned because it would take months to implement, and due to fears that it could affect other countries such as Uganda and Kenya.

On 25 September 1956 the Chancellor of the Exchequer, Harold Macmillan, met informally with President Eisenhower at the White House. He misread Eisenhower's determination to avoid war and told Eden that the Americans would not in any way oppose the attempt to topple Nasser. Though Eden had known Eisenhower for years and had many direct contacts during the crisis, he also misread the situation. The Americans saw themselves as the champion of decolonisation and refused to support any move that could be seen as imperialism or colonialism. Eisenhower felt the crisis had to be handled peacefully; he told Eden that American public opinion would not support a military solution. Eden and other leading British officials incorrectly believed Nasser's support for Palestinian militia against Israel, as well as his attempts to destabilise pro-western regimes in Iraq and other Arab states, would deter the US from intervening with the operation. Eisenhower specifically warned that the Americans and the world would be "outraged" unless all peaceful routes had been exhausted, and even then "the eventual price might become far too heavy". At the root of the problem was the fact that Eden felt that Britain was still an independent world power. His lack of sympathy for British integration into Europe, manifested in his scepticism about the fledgling European Economic Community (EEC), was another aspect of his belief in Britain's independent role in world affairs.

Israel invaded the Sinai Peninsula at the end of October 1956. Britain and France moved in ostensibly to separate the two sides and bring peace, but in fact to regain control of the canal and overthrow Nasser. The United States immediately and strongly opposed the invasion. The United Nations denounced the invasion, the Soviets were bellicose, and only New Zealand, Australia, West Germany and South Africa spoke out for the British and French position.

The Suez Canal was of lesser economic importance to the US, which at the time acquired only 15 per cent of its oil through that route, compared to well over half of the total oil supply to Britain. Eisenhower wanted to broker international peace in "fragile" regions. He did not see Nasser as a serious threat to the West, but he was concerned that the Soviets, who were well known to want a permanent warm water base for their Black Sea Fleet in the Mediterranean, might side with Egypt. Eisenhower feared a pro-Soviet backlash amongst the Arab nations if, as seemed likely, Egypt suffered an humiliating defeat at the hands of the British, French and Israelis.

Eden, who faced domestic pressure from his party to take action, as well as stopping the decline of British influence in the Middle East, had ignored Britain's financial dependence on the US in the wake of the Second World War, and had assumed the US would automatically endorse whatever action taken by its closest ally. At the 'Law not War' rally in Trafalgar Square on 4 November 1956, Eden was ridiculed by Aneurin Bevan:

Sir Anthony Eden has been pretending that he is now invading Egypt to strengthen the United Nations. Every burglar of course could say the same thing; he could argue that he was entering the house to train the police. So, if Sir Anthony Eden is sincere in what he is saying, and he may be, then he is too stupid to be a prime minister.

Public opinion was mixed; some historians think that the majority of public opinion in the UK was on Eden's side.

Eden was forced to bow to American diplomatic and financial pressure, and protests at home, by calling a ceasefire when Anglo-French forces had captured only 23 miles (37 km) of the 120 miles (190 km) of the canal. With the US threatening to withdraw its financial support for the pound sterling, the cabinet divided and the Chancellor of the Exchequer Harold Macmillan threatening to resign unless an immediate ceasefire was called, Eden was under immense pressure. He considered defying the calls until the commander on the ground told him it could take up to six days for the Anglo-French troops to secure the entire Canal zone. Therefore, a ceasefire was called at quarter past midnight on 7 November.

In his 1987 memoir Spycatcher, the MI5 officer Peter Wright said that, following the imposed ending to the military operation, Eden reactivated the assassination option for a second time. However, all MI6 agents in Egypt had been caught by Nasser’s General Intelligence Service, and a new operation, using renegade Egyptian officers, was drawn up. It failed principally because the cache of weapons which had been hidden on the outskirts of Cairo was found to be defective.

Suez badly damaged Eden's reputation for statesmanship, and led to a breakdown in his health. He went on holiday to the Colony of Jamaica in November 1956, at a time when he was still determined to soldier on as prime minister. His health, however, did not improve, and during his absence from London, Macmillan and Rab Butler worked to manoeuvre him out of office. On the morning of the ceasefire Eisenhower agreed to meet with Eden to publicly resolve their differences, but this offer was later withdrawn after Secretary of State Dulles advised that it could inflame the Middle Eastern situation further.

The Observer accused Eden of lying to Parliament over the Suez Crisis, while MPs from all parties criticised his calling a ceasefire before the canal was taken. Churchill, while publicly supportive of Eden's actions, privately criticised his successor for not seeing the military operation through to its conclusion. Eden easily survived a vote of confidence in the Commons on 8 November.

==== 1957 resignation ====
While Eden was on holiday at the Goldeneye estate in Oracabessa Bay, other members of the government discussed on 20 November 1956 how to counter charges that Britain and France had worked in collusion with Israel to seize the Canal, but decided there was very little evidence in the public domain.

On his return from Jamaica on 14 December, Eden still hoped to continue as prime minister. He had lost his traditional base of support on the Tory left and amongst moderate opinion nationally, but appears to have hoped to rebuild a new base of support amongst the Tory right. However, his political position had eroded during his absence. He wished to make a statement attacking Nasser as a puppet of the Soviets, attacking the United Nations and speaking of the "lessons of the 1930s", but was prevented from doing so by Macmillan, Butler and Lord Salisbury.

On his return to the Commons on 17 December, he slipped into the chamber largely unacknowledged by his own party. One Conservative MP rose to wave his Order Paper, only to have to sit down in embarrassment whilst Labour MPs laughed. On 18 December he addressed the 1922 Committee (Conservative backbenchers), declaring "as long as I live, I shall never apologise for what we did", but was unable to answer a question about the validity of the Tripartite Declaration of 1950 (which he had in fact reaffirmed in April 1955, two days before becoming prime minister). In his final statement to the Commons as prime minister, on 20 December 1956, he performed well in a difficult debate, but told MPs that "there was not foreknowledge that Israel would attack Egypt". Victor Rothwell writes that the knowledge of his having misled the Commons in this way must have hung over him thereafter, as was the concern that the Americans might demand that Britain pay reparations to Egypt. Papers released in January 1987 showed the entire cabinet had been informed of the plan on 23 October 1956.

Eden suffered another fever at Chequers over Christmas, but was still talking of going on an official trip to the Soviet Union in April 1957, wanting a full inquiry into the Crabb affair and badgering Lord Hailsham (First Lord of the Admiralty) about the £6 million being spent on oil storage at Malta.

Eden resigned on 9 January 1957, after his doctors warned him his life was at stake if he continued in office. John Charmley writes "Ill-health ... provide(d) a dignified reason for an action (i.e. resignation) which would, in any event, have been necessary." Rothwell writes that "mystery persists" over exactly how Eden was persuaded to resign, although the limited evidence suggests that Butler, who was expected to succeed him as prime minister, was at the centre of the intrigue. Rothwell writes that Eden's fevers were "nasty but brief and not life-threatening" and that there may have been "manipulation of medical evidence" to make Eden's health seem "even worse" than it was. Macmillan wrote in his diary that "nature had provided a real health reason" when a "diplomatic illness" might otherwise have had to be invented. David Carlton (1981) even suggested that the Palace might have been involved, a suggestion discussed by Rothwell. As early as spring 1954 Eden had been indifferent to cultivating good relations with the new Queen. Eden is known to have favoured a Japanese- or Scandinavian-style monarchy (i.e. with no involvement in politics) and in January 1956 he had insisted that Nikita Khrushchev and Nikolai Bulganin should spend only the minimum amount of time in talks with the Queen. Evidence also exists that the Palace was concerned at not being kept fully informed during the Suez Crisis. In the 1960s Clarissa Eden was observed to speak of the Queen "in an extremely hostile and belittling way", and in an interview in 1976, Eden commented that he "would not claim she was pro-Suez".

Although the media expected Butler would get the nod as Eden's successor, a survey of the cabinet taken for the Queen showed Macmillan was the nearly unanimous choice, and he became prime minister on 10 January 1957. Shortly afterwards Eden and his wife left England for a holiday in New Zealand.

=== Britain–France rejected plan for union ===
British Government cabinet papers from September 1956, during Eden's premiership, have shown that French Prime Minister Guy Mollet approached the British Government suggesting the idea of an economic and political union between France and Britain. This was a similar offer, in reverse, to that made by Churchill (drawing on a plan devised by Leo Amery) in June 1940.

Mollet‘s offer was referred to by Sir John Colville, Churchill's former private secretary, in his collected diaries, The Fringes of Power (1985), his having gleaned the information in 1957 from Air Chief Marshal Sir William Dickson during an air flight (and, according to Colville, after several whiskies and soda). Mollet's request for Union with Britain was rejected by Eden, but the additional possibility of France joining the Commonwealth of Nations was considered, although similarly rejected. Colville noted, in respect of Suez, that Eden and his Foreign Secretary Selwyn Lloyd "felt still more beholden to the French on account of this offer".

== Retirement ==
When he stood down as prime minister, Eden also resigned from the Commons, where he had been a member for 33 years. Eden kept in touch with Lord Salisbury, agreeing with him that Macmillan had been the better choice as prime minister, but sympathising with his resignation over Macmillan's Cyprus policy. Despite a series of letters in which Macmillan almost begged him for a personal endorsement prior to the 1959 general election, Eden only issued a declaration of support for the Conservative Government. Eden retained much of his personal popularity in Britain and contemplated returning to Parliament. Several Conservative MPs were reportedly willing to give up their seats for him, although the party hierarchy was less keen. He finally gave up such hopes in late 1960 after an exhausting speaking tour of Yorkshire. Macmillan initially offered to recommend him for a viscountcy, which Eden assumed to be a calculated insult, and he was granted an earldom (which was then the traditional rank for a former prime minister) after reminding Macmillan that he had already been offered one by the Queen. He entered the House of Lords as the Earl of Avon in 1961.

In retirement Lord Avon, as he became, lived in 'Rose Bower' by the banks of the River Ebble in Broad Chalke, Wiltshire. Starting in 1961, he bred a herd of 60 Hereford cattle (one of whom was called "Churchill") until a further decline in his health forced him to sell them in 1975. In 1968 he bought Alvediston Manor in Wiltshire, where he lived until his death on 14 January 1977.

In July 1962 Lord Avon made front-page news by commenting that "Mr Selwyn Lloyd has been horribly treated" when the latter was dismissed as Chancellor in the reshuffle known as the "Night of the Long Knives". In August 1962, at a dinner party, he had a "slanging match" with Nigel Birch, who as Secretary of State for Air had not wholeheartedly supported the Suez Invasion. In 1963 Lord Avon initially favoured Hailsham for the Conservative leadership but then supported Douglas-Home as a compromise candidate.

From 1945 to 1973, Lord Avon was Chancellor of the University of Birmingham. In a television interview in 1966, he called on the United States to halt its bombing of North Vietnam to concentrate on developing a peace plan "that might conceivably be acceptable to Hanoi." The bombing of North Vietnam, he argued, would never settle the conflict in South Vietnam. "On the contrary," he declared, "bombing creates a sort of David and Goliath complex in any country that has to suffer—as we had to, and as I suspect the Germans had to, in the last war." Lord Avon sat for extensive interviews for the famed multi-part Thames Television production, The World at War, which was first broadcast in 1973. He also featured frequently in Marcel Ophüls' 1969 documentary Le chagrin et la pitié, discussing the occupation of France in a wider geopolitical context. He spoke impeccable, if accented, French.

Avon's occasional articles and his early 1970s television appearance were an exception to an almost total retirement. He seldom appeared in public, unlike other former prime ministers, e.g. James Callaghan who commented frequently on current affairs. He was even accidentally omitted from a list of Conservative prime ministers by Margaret Thatcher when she became Conservative leader in 1975, although she later went out of her way to establish relations with Lord Avon, and later, his widow. In retirement, he was highly critical of regimes such as Sukarno's Indonesia which confiscated assets belonging to their former colonial rulers, and appears to have reverted somewhat to the right-wing views which he had espoused in the 1920s.

=== Memoirs ===
In retirement, Lord Avon corresponded with Selwyn Lloyd, co-ordinating the release of information and with which writers they would agree to speak and when. Rumours that Britain had colluded with France and Israel appeared, albeit in garbled form, as early as 1957. By the 1970s they had agreed that Lloyd would only tell his version of the story after Avon's death (in the event, Lloyd would outlive Lord Avon by a year, struggling with terminal illness to complete his own memoirs).

In retirement, Lord Avon was particularly bitter that Eisenhower had initially indicated British and French troops should be allowed to remain around Port Said, only for the US ambassador Henry Cabot Lodge Jr., to press for an immediate withdrawal at the UN, thereby rendering the operation a complete failure. Avon felt the Eisenhower administration's unexpected opposition was hypocritical in light of the 1953 Iranian coup d'état and the 1954 Guatemalan coup d'état.

The Earl of Avon published three volumes of political memoirs, in which he denied that there had been any collusion with France and Israel. Like Churchill, Lord Avon relied heavily on the ghost-writing of young researchers, whose drafts he would sometimes toss angrily into the flowerbeds outside his study. One of them was the young David Dilks.

In his view, American Secretary of State John Foster Dulles, whom he particularly disliked, was responsible for the ill fate of the Suez adventure. In an October press conference, barely three weeks before the fighting began, Dulles had coupled the Suez Canal issue with colonialism, and his statement infuriated Eden and much of the UK as well. "The dispute over Nasser's seizure of the canal," wrote Eden, "had, of course, nothing to do with colonialism, but was concerned with international rights." He added that "if the United States had to defend her treaty rights in the Panama Canal, she would not regard such action as colonialism." His lack of candour further diminished his standing, and a principal concern in his later years was trying to rebuild his reputation that was severely damaged by Suez, sometimes taking legal action to protect his viewpoint.

Lord Avon faulted the United States for forcing him to withdraw, but he took credit for United Nations action in patrolling the Israeli-Egyptian borders. Eden said of the invasion, "Peace at any price has never averted war. We must not repeat the mistakes of the pre-war years, by behaving as though the enemies of peace and order are armed with only good intentions." Recalling the incident in a 1967 interview, Lord Avon declared, "I am still unrepentant about Suez. People never look at what would have happened if we had done nothing. There is a parallel with the 1930s. If you allow people to break agreements with impunity, the appetite grows to feed on such things. I don't see what other we ought to have done. One cannot dodge. It is hard to act rather than dodge." In his 1967 interview (which he stipulated would not be used until after his death), Avon acknowledged secret dealings with the French and "intimations" of the Israeli attack. He insisted, however, that "the joint enterprise and the preparations for it were justified in the light of the wrongs it [the Anglo-French invasion] was designed to prevent." "I have no apologies to offer," Eden declared.

At the time of his retirement, Eden had been short of money, although he was paid a £100,000 advance for his memoirs by The Times, with any profit over this amount to be split between himself and the newspaper. By 1970 they had brought him £185,000 (around £3,000,000 at 2014 prices), leaving him a wealthy man for the first time in his life. Towards the end of his life, he published a personal memoir of his early life, Another World (1976).

== Personal life ==
=== Relationships ===
On 5 November 1923, shortly before his election to Parliament, he married Beatrice Beckett, who was then eighteen. They had three sons: Simon Gascoigne (1924–1945), Robert, who died fifteen minutes after being born in October 1928, and Nicholas (1930–1985).

The marriage was not a success, with both parties apparently conducting affairs. By the mid-1930s his diaries seldom mention Beatrice. The marriage finally broke up under the strain of the loss of their son Simon, who was killed in action with the RAF in Burma in 1945. His plane was reported "missing in action" on 23 June and found on 16 July; Eden did not want the news to be public until after the election result on 26 July, to avoid claims of "making political capital" from it.

Between 1946 and 1950, whilst separated from his wife, Eden conducted an open affair with Dorothy, Countess Beatty, the wife of David, Earl Beatty. In 1950 Eden and Beatrice were finally divorced, and in 1952, he married Churchill's niece Clarissa Spencer-Churchill, a nominal Roman Catholic who was fiercely criticised by the Catholic writer Evelyn Waugh for marrying a divorced man.

Eden was the great-great-grandnephew of the author Emily Eden, and in 1947 he wrote an introduction to her novel The Semi-Attached Couple (1860).

=== Health issues ===
Eden had a stomach ulcer, exacerbated by overwork, as early as the 1920s. He also had gallstones, requiring surgery to remove the gallbladder (cholecystectomy). The physician consulted at the time was the Royal Physician, Sir Horace Evans. Three surgeons were recommended and Eden chose the one that had previously performed his appendectomy, John Basil Hume, surgeon from St Bartholomew's Hospital. During the open cholecystectomy on 12 April 1953, in London, it is thought that the common bile duct was damaged, leaving Eden susceptible to recurrent infections, biliary obstruction, and liver failure.

Eden suffered from cholangitis, an abdominal infection which became so agonising that he was admitted to hospital in 1956 with a temperature reaching 41 °C (106 °F). He was re-operated in London in an attempt to correct the injury with placement of a surgical drain. He suffered further with symptoms of biliary obstruction and required further revisional surgery on three more occasions in Boston, Massachusetts, to treat recurrent stricturing of the right hepatic duct.

He was also prescribed Benzedrine, an amphetamine, in the 1950s. It was regarded then as a harmless stimulant, and at that time, was prescribed and used casually. Among the side effects of Benzedrine are insomnia, restlessness, and mood swings, all of which Eden suffered during the Suez Crisis; indeed, earlier in his premiership he complained of being kept awake at night by the sound of motor scooters, being unable to sleep more than five hours per night or sometimes waking up at 3 am. Eden's drug regimen is now commonly agreed to have been a part of the reason for his bad judgment while prime minister. The Thorpe biography, however, denied Eden's abuse of Benzedrine, stating that the allegations were "untrue, as is made clear by Eden's medical records at Birmingham University, not yet [at the time] available for research".

The resignation document written by Eden for release to the Cabinet on 9 January 1957 admitted his dependence on stimulants while denying that they had affected his judgement during the Suez crisis in the autumn of 1956. "I have been obliged to increase the drugs [taken after the "bad abdominal operations"] considerably and also increase the stimulants necessary to counteract the drugs. This has finally had an adverse effect on my precarious inside," he wrote. However, in his book The Suez Affair (1966), the historian Hugh Thomas, quoted by David Owen, claimed that Eden had revealed to a colleague that he was "practically living on Benzedrine" at the time.

In all, at different points, but mostly simultaneously, he took a combination of sedatives, opioid painkillers and corresponding stimulants to counteract their depressant effects; these included Promazine (a strongly sedative antipsychotic Eden used to induce sleep and counteract the stimulants he took), Dextroamphetamine, Sodium Amytal (a barbiturate sedative), Secobarbital (a barbiturate sedative), Vitamin B12 and Pethidine (a unique opioid painkiller thought at the time to have the property of relaxing the bile ducts which is now known to be inaccurate).

== Final illness and death ==
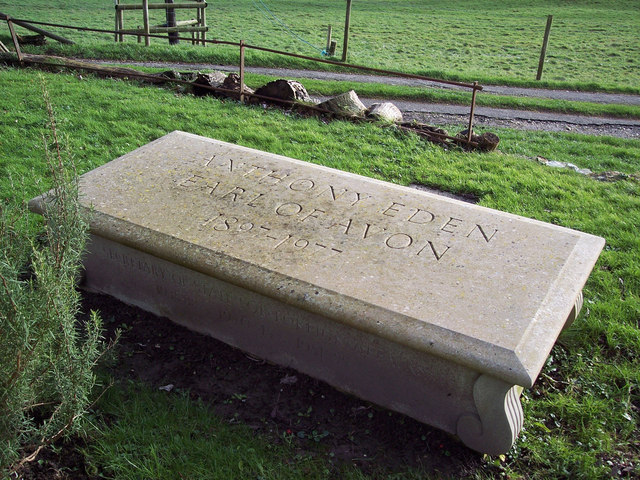
Tomb at St Mary's church, Alvediston, Wiltshire

In December 1976, Lord Avon, as Eden now was, felt well enough to travel with his wife to the United States to spend Christmas and New Year with W. Averell and Pamela Harriman; however, after reaching the United States, his health rapidly deteriorated. Prime Minister James Callaghan arranged for an RAF plane that was already in America to divert to Miami, to fly Avon home.

Lord Avon died of metastatic prostate cancer to bones and mediastinal nodes at his home, Alvediston Manor in Wiltshire, on 14 January 1977, aged 79. His will was proven on 17 March, with his estate amounting to £92,900 (equivalent to £545,815 in 2025).

He was buried in St Mary's churchyard at Alvediston, Wiltshire, just 3 miles (4.8 km) upstream from Rose Bower, at the source of the River Ebble. His papers are housed at the University of Birmingham Special Collections.

At his death, Lord Avon was the last surviving member of Churchill's War Cabinet. His surviving son, Nicholas Eden, 2nd Earl of Avon (1930–1985), known as Viscount Eden from 1961 to 1977, was also a politician and a minister in the Margaret Thatcher government until his death from AIDS at the age of 54.

== Legacy ==
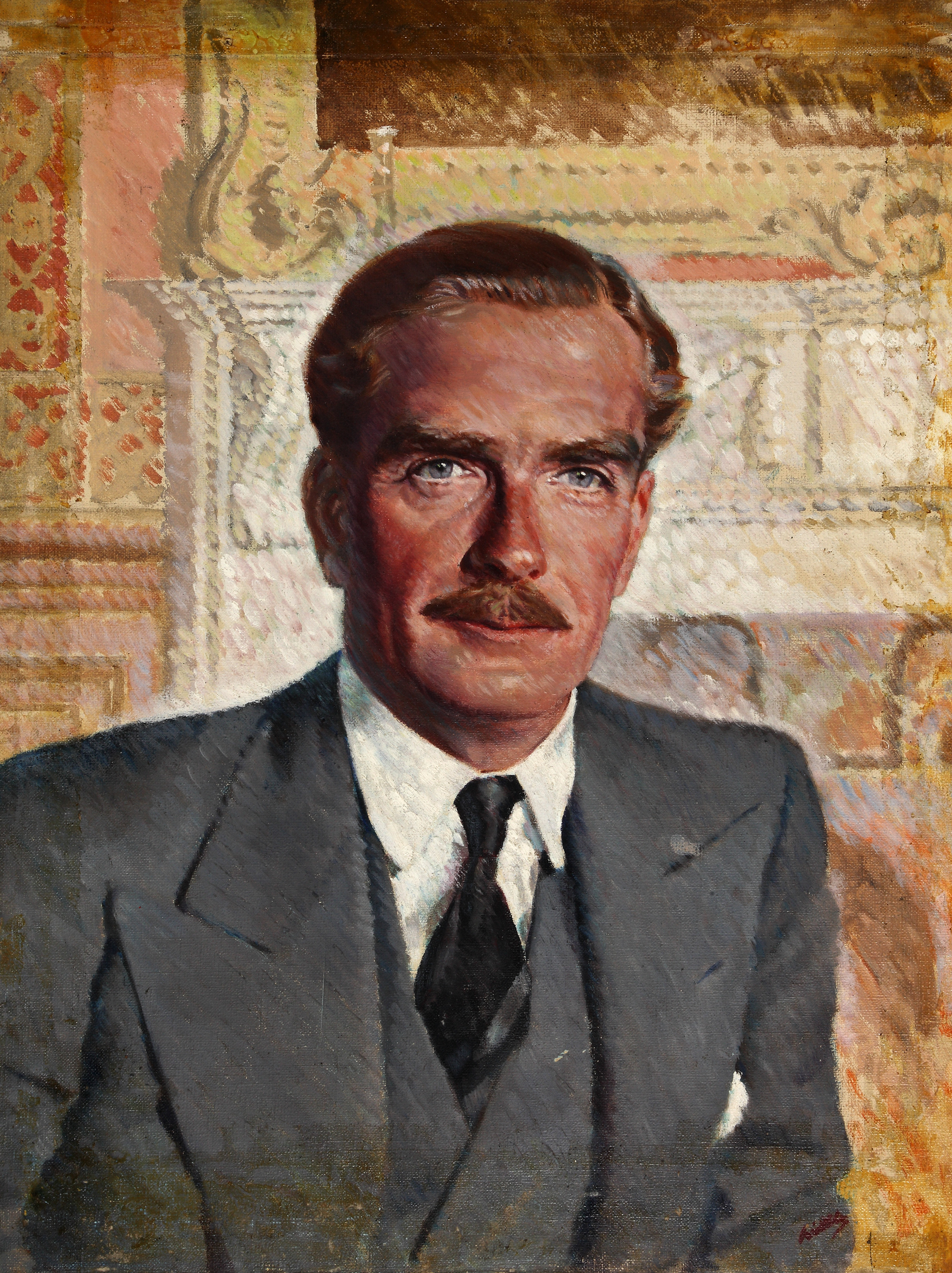
Portrait by William Little, c. 1945

Eden liked to portray himself as well-mannered and well-groomed. This image gave him huge popular support throughout his political life, but some contemporaries felt he was merely a superficial person lacking any deeper convictions. That view was enforced by his very pragmatic approach to politics. In 1947, Dick Crossman called Eden "that peculiarly British type, the idealist without conviction".

US Secretary of State Dean Acheson regarded Eden as quite an old-fashioned amateur in politics, typical of the British establishment. In contrast, Soviet Leader Nikita Khrushchev commented that until his Suez adventure Eden had been "in the top world class".

Eden was heavily influenced by Stanley Baldwin when he first entered Parliament. After earlier combative beginnings, he cultivated a low-key speaking style that relied heavily on rational argument and consensus-building, rather than rhetoric and party point-scoring, which was often highly effective in the Commons. However, he was not always an effective public speaker, and his parliamentary performances sometimes disappointed many of his followers, such as after his resignation from Neville Chamberlain's government. Sir Oswald Mosley said he never understood why Eden was so strongly pushed by the Conservative party, as he felt that Eden's abilities were very much inferior to those of Macmillan and Oliver Stanley. Winston Churchill once even commented on one of Eden's speeches that the latter had used every cliché except "God is love". That was deliberate; Eden often struck out original phrases from speech drafts and replaced them with clichés.

Eden's inability to express himself clearly is often attributed to shyness and lack of self-confidence. Eden is known to have been much more direct in meeting with his secretaries and advisers than in cabinet meetings and public speeches and sometimes tended to become enraged and behave "like a child", only to regain his temper within a few minutes. Many who worked for him remarked that he was "two men": one charming, erudite, and hard-working, and the other petty and prone to temper tantrums, during which he would insult his subordinates.

As prime minister, Eden was notorious for telephoning ministers and newspaper editors from 6 a.m. onward. Rothwell wrote that even before Suez, the telephone had become "a drug": "During the Suez Crisis Eden's telephone mania exceeded all bounds".

Eden was notoriously "unclubbable" and offended Churchill by declining to join The Other Club. He also declined honorary membership in the Athenaeum. However, he maintained friendly relations with Opposition MPs; for example, George Thomas received a kind two-page letter from Eden on learning that his stepfather had died. Eden was a Trustee of the National Gallery (in succession to MacDonald) between 1935 and 1949. He also had a deep knowledge of Persian poetry and of Shakespeare and would bond with anybody who could display similar knowledge.

Rothwell wrote that, although Eden was capable of acting with ruthlessness, for instance over the repatriation of the Cossacks in 1945, his main concern was to avoid being seen as "an appeaser", such as over the Soviet reluctance to accept a democratic Poland in October 1944. Like many people, Eden convinced himself that his past actions were more consistent than they had in fact been.

A. J. P. Taylor wrote in the 1970s: "Eden … destroyed (his reputation as a peacemaker) and led Great Britain to one of the greatest humiliations in her history … (he) seemed to take on a new personality. He acted impatiently and on impulse. Previously flexible he now relied on dogma, denouncing Nasser as a second Hitler. Though he claimed to be upholding international law, he in fact disregarded the United Nations Organisation which he had helped to create...The outcome was pathetic rather than tragic".

The biographer D. R. Thorpe says Eden's four goals were to secure the canal; to make sure it remained open and that oil shipments would continue; to depose Nasser; and to prevent the Soviets from gaining influence. "The immediate consequence of the crisis was that the Suez Canal was blocked, oil supplies were interrupted, Nasser's position as the leader of Arab nationalism was strengthened, and the way was left open for Russian intrusion into the Middle East.

Michael Foot pushed for a special inquiry along the lines of the Parliamentary Inquiry into the Attack on the Dardanelles in the First World War, although Harold Wilson (Labour Prime Minister 1964–70 and 1974–76) regarded the matter as a can of worms best left unopened. This talk ceased after the defeat of the Arab armies by Israel in the Six-Day War of 1967, after which Eden received a lot of mail telling him that he had been right, and his reputation, not least in Israel and the United States, soared. In 1986 Eden's official biographer, Robert Rhodes James, re-evaluated sympathetically Eden's stance over Suez and in 1990, following the Iraqi invasion of Kuwait, James asked: "Who can now claim that Eden was wrong?" Such arguments turn mostly on whether, as a matter of policy, the Suez operation was fundamentally flawed or whether, as such "revisionists" thought, the lack of American support conveyed the impression that the West was divided and weak. Anthony Nutting, who resigned as Minister of State for Foreign Affairs over Suez, expressed the former view in 1967, the year of the Arab–Israeli Six-Day War, when he wrote that "we had sown the wind of bitterness and we were to reap the whirlwind of revenge and rebellion". Conversely, Jonathan Pearson argues in Sir Anthony Eden and the Suez Crisis: Reluctant Gamble (2002) that Eden was more reluctant and less bellicose than most historians have judged. D. R. Thorpe, another of Eden's biographers, writes that Suez was "a truly tragic end to his premiership, and one that came to assume a disproportionate importance in any assessment of his careers"; he suggests that had the Suez venture succeeded, "there would almost certainly have been no Middle East war in 1967, and probably no Yom Kippur War in 1973 also".

Guy Millard, one of Eden's private secretaries, who thirty years later, in a radio interview, spoke publicly for the first time on the crisis, made an insider's judgement about Eden: "It was his mistake of course and a tragic and disastrous mistake for him. I think he overestimated the importance of Nasser, Egypt, the Canal, even of the Middle East." While British actions in 1956 have usually been described as "imperialistic", the main motivation was economic. Eden was a liberal supporter of nationalist ambitions, including Sudanese independence, and his 1954 Suez Canal Base Agreement, which withdrew British troops from Suez in return for certain guarantees, was negotiated with the Conservative Party against Churchill's wishes.

Rothwell believes that Eden should have cancelled the Suez invasion plans in mid-October, when Anglo-French negotiations at the United Nations were making some headway, and that in 1956 the Arab countries threw away a chance to make peace with Israel on her existing borders.

Recent biographies put more emphasis on Eden's achievements in foreign policy and perceive him to have held deep convictions regarding world peace and security, as well as a strong social conscience. Rhodes James applied Churchill's famous verdict on Lord Curzon (in Great Contemporaries) to Eden: "The morning had been golden; the noontime was bronze; and the evening lead. But all was solid, and each was polished until it shone after its fashion".

Both Eden Court, Leamington Spa, built in 1960, and Sir Anthony Eden Way, Warwick, built in the 2000s, as well as the Eden Arms Hotel in Eden's hometown of Rushyford, are named in his honour.

== Archives ==
Personal and political papers of Anthony Eden and papers of the Eden family can be found at the Cadbury Research Library, University of Birmingham in the Avon Papers collection. A collection of letters and other papers relating to Anthony Eden can also be found at the Cadbury Research Library, University of Birmingham.

== Memoirs ==
- Another World. London. Allen Lane, 1976. (covers early life)
- Facing the Dictators: The Memoirs of Anthony Eden. London. Cassell, 1962. (covers early career and first period as Foreign Secretary, to 1938)
- The Reckoning: The Memoirs of Anthony Eden. London. Cassell, 1965. (covers 1938–1945)
- Full Circle: The Memoirs of Anthony Eden. London. Cassell, 1960. (covers post-war career)

== Arms ==
Coat of arms of Sir Anthony Eden, 1st Earl of Avon
Crest A dexter arm embowed in armour couped at the shoulder proper and grasping a garb or banded vert. Escutcheon Gules on a chevron argent between three garbs or banded Vert as many escallops sable. Supporters Dexter, A leopard guardant or, resting the sinister hind paw on a garb or, banded vert; Sinister, A like leopard resting the dexter hind paw on a similar garb. Motto Si Sit Prudentia (If there be but prudence). Orders The Most Noble Order of the Garter.

== Bibliography ==
- Aster, Sidney (1976). Anthony Eden. London: St Martin's Press. ISBN 978-0-312-04235-6.
- Barker, Elisabeth (1978). Churchill & Eden at War. London: Macmillan.
- Broad, Lewis (1955). Sir Anthony Eden: The Chronicles of a Career. London: Hutchinson.
- Carlton, David (1981). Anthony Eden, a Biography. London: Allen Lane. ISBN 978-0-7139-0829-9.
- Churchill, Winston S. (1948). The Gathering Storm. Boston: Houghton Mifflin Co.
- Charmley, John (1989). Chamberlain and the lost peace. London: Hodder & Stoughton. ISBN 0340508531.
- Charmley, John (1996). Churchill's Grand Alliance: The Anglo-American Special Relationship 1940–57. London: Hodder & Stoughton. ISBN 978-0-340-59760-6. OCLC 247165348.
- Dutton, David. Anthony Eden: a life and reputation (1997) Online free
- Faber, David (2008). Munich: The 1938 Appeasement Crisis. New York & London: Simon & Schuster. ISBN 978-1-84737-008-2.
- Hathaway, Robert M. (1994). "Suez, the Perfect Failure: A Review Essay". Political Science Quarterly. 109 (2): 361–366. doi:10.2307/2152629. JSTOR 2152629.
- Hefler, H. Matthew (2018). "'In the way': Intelligence, Eden, and British foreign policy towards Italy, 1937–38". Intelligence and National Security. 33 (6): 1–19. doi:10.1080/02684527.2018.1444433. S2CID 158286069.
- Henderson, John T. (1976). "Leadership Personality and War: The Cases of Richard Nixon and Anthony Eden". Political Science. 28 (2): 141–164. doi:10.1177/003231877602800205. PMID 11635545.
- Jones, Matthew (1997). "Macmillan, Eden, the War in the Mediterranean and Anglo-American Relations". Twentieth Century British History. 8: 27–48. doi:10.1093/tcbh/8.1.27.
- Lamb, Richard (1987). The Failure of the Eden Government. London: Sidgwick & Jackson Ltd. ISBN 978-0-283-99534-7.
- Lomas, Daniel W. B. (2020). "Facing the Dictators: Anthony Eden, the Foreign Office and British Intelligence, 1935–1945". The International History Review. 42 (4): 794–812. doi:10.1080/07075332.2019.1650092.
- Mallett, Robert (2000). "Fascist Foreign Policy and Official Italian views of Anthony Eden in the 1930s". The Historical Journal. 43: 157–187. doi:10.1017/s0018246x99008808. S2CID 159698836.
- Morewood, Steven (2013). "Failure of a Mission: Anthony Eden's Balkans Odyssey to save Greece, 12 February – 7 April 1941". Global War Studies. 10: 6–75. doi:10.5893/19498489.10.01.01 (inactive 29 September 2025). OCLC 6896245183, 5222394318.
- Pearson, Jonathan (2002). Sir Anthony Eden and the Suez Crisis: Reluctant Gamble. Palgrave Macmillan UK. ISBN 978-0-333-98451-2.
- Peters, A. R. Anthony Eden at the Foreign Office 1931-1938. London: St. Martin's Press, 1986 ISBN 978-0-312-04236-3.
- Rhodes James, Robert (November 1986). "Anthony Eden and the Suez Crisis". History Today. Vol. 36, no. 11. pp. 8–15.
- Rhodes James, Robert (1987). Anthony Eden. Papermac. ISBN 978-0-333-45503-6.
- Rose, Norman. "The Resignation of Anthony Eden." Historical Journal 25.4 (1982): 911–931.
- Rothwell, V. Anthony Eden: a political biography, 1931–1957 (1992)
- Ruane, Kevin. "SEATO, MEDO, and the Baghdad Pact: Anthony Eden, British Foreign Policy and the Collective Defense of Southeast Asia and the Middle East, 1952–1955," Diplomacy & Statecraft, March 2005, 16#1, pp. 169–199
- Ruane, Kevin. "The Origins of the Eden–Dulles Antagonism: The Yoshida Letter and the Cold War in East Asia 1951–1952." Contemporary British History 25#1 (2011): 141–156.
- Ruane, Kevin, and James Ellison. "Managing the Americans: Anthony Eden, Harold Macmillan and the Pursuit of 'Power-by-Proxy' in the 1950s," Contemporary British History, Autumn 2004, 18#3, pp 147–167
- Ruane, Kevin; Jones, Matthew (2019). Anthony Eden, Anglo-American Relations and the 1954 Indochina Crisis. London: Bloomsbury Academic. ISBN 978-1-350-02117-4.
- Thorpe, D. R. "Eden, (Robert) Anthony, first earl of Avon (1897–1977)", Oxford Dictionary of National Biography (Oxford University Press, 2004) online Archived 8 November 2021 at the Wayback Machine
- Thorpe, D. R. Eden: The Life and Times of Anthony Eden, First Earl of Avon, 1897–1977. London: Chatto and Windus, 2003 ISBN 0-7126-6505-6.
- Trukhanovsky, V. Anthony Eden. Moscow: Progress Publishers, 1984.
- Thorpe, D. R. (2010). Supermac: The Life of Harold Macmillan. London: Chatto & Windus. ISBN 978-1-84413-541-7.
- Watry, David M. Diplomacy at the Brink: Eisenhower, Churchill, and Eden in the Cold War (LSU Press, 2014). online review Archived 8 November 2021 at the Wayback Machine
- Woodward, Llewellyn. British Foreign Policy in the Second World War (1962) Abridged version of his massive five volume history; focuses on Foreign Office and British missions abroad, under Eden's control. 592pp
- Woolner, David. Searching for Cooperation in a Troubled World: Cordell Hull, Anthony Eden and Anglo-American Relations, 1933–1938 (2015).
- Woolner, David B. "The Frustrated Idealists: Cordell Hull, Anthony Eden and the Search for Anglo-American Cooperation, 1933– 1938" (PhD dissertation, McGill University, 1996) online free Archived 11 July 2019 at the Wayback Machine bibliography pp 373–91.

=== Primary sources ===
- Boyle, Peter. Eden-Eisenhower Correspondence, 1955–1957 (2005) 230p.

Parliament of the United Kingdom
Preceded by Ernest Pollock	Member of Parliament for Warwick and Leamington; 1923–1957	Succeeded by John Hobson
Political offices
Preceded by Hugh Dalton	Under-Secretary of State for Foreign Affairs; 1931–1934	Succeeded by The Earl Stanhope
Preceded by Stanley Baldwin	Lord Privy Seal; 1934–1935	Succeeded by The Marquess of Londonderry
Unknown	Minister without Portfolio for League of Nations Affairs; 1935	Unknown
Preceded by Sir Samuel Hoare	Foreign Secretary; 1935–1938	Succeeded by The Viscount Halifax
Preceded by Sir Thomas Inskip	Secretary of State for Dominion Affairs; 1939–1940	Succeeded by The Viscount Caldecote
Preceded by Oliver Stanley	Secretary of State for War; 1940	Succeeded by David Margesson
Preceded by The Viscount Halifax	Foreign Secretary; 1940–1945	Succeeded by Ernest Bevin
Preceded by Sir Stafford Cripps	Leader of the House of Commons; 1942–1945	Succeeded by Herbert Morrison
Preceded by Herbert Morrison	Deputy Prime Minister; 1951–1955	Vacant Title next held by Rab Butler
Preceded by Herbert Morrison	Foreign Secretary; 1951–1955	Succeeded by Harold Macmillan
Preceded by Sir Winston Churchill	Prime Minister of the United Kingdom; 1955–1957	Succeeded by Harold Macmillan
Party political offices
Preceded by Sir Winston Churchill	Leader of the Conservative Party; 1955–1957	Succeeded by Harold Macmillan
Academic offices
Preceded by The Viscount Cecil of Chelwood	Chancellor of the University of Birmingham; 1945–1973	Succeeded by Peter Scott
Peerage of the United Kingdom
New creation	Earl of Avon; 1961–1977	Succeeded by Nicholas Eden
