= 1968 Warwick and Leamington by-election =

UK Parliamentary by-election

The 1968 by-election in Warwick and Leamington, in Warwickshire, England, occurred on 28 March 1968, following the death of the Conservative MP Sir John Hobson and resulted in a hold for the Conservatives.

== Result ==
Warwick and Leamington by-election, 1968
Party	Candidate	Votes	%	±%
Conservative	Dudley Smith	28,914	68.3	+16.7
Labour	Raymond Carter	6,992	16.5	−19.6
Liberal	Antony Butcher	6,415	15.2	+2.9
Majority		21,922	51.8	+36.8
Turnout		42,321		
Conservative hold		Swing	+18.2	
