= Warwick and Leamington =

Parliamentary constituency in the United Kingdom, 1885 onwards

Coordinates: 52.28°N 1.51°W

- Borough constituency for the House of Commons
- Boundaries since 2024
- Boundary of Warwick and Leamington in the West Midlands region
- County: Warwickshire
- Electorate: 66,278 (December 2010)
- Major settlements: Warwick and Leamington

Current constituency
- Created: 1885
- Member of Parliament: Matt Western (Labour)
- Created from: Warwick

Warwick and Leamington is a constituency (Note: A borough constituency (for the purposes of election expenses and type of returning officer).) in Warwickshire represented in the House of Commons of the UK Parliament since the 2017 general election by Matt Western of the Labour Party. As its name suggests, it encompasses the towns of Warwick and Leamington.

From 1923 to 1957, the seat was held by Anthony Eden (Sir Anthony Eden from 1954), who served as Prime Minister from 1955 to 1957.

== Boundaries ==
1885–1918: The existing parliamentary borough of Warwick, the municipal borough of Royal Leamington Spa, and the local government districts of Milverton and Lillington.

1918–1950: The Boroughs of Warwick, Royal Leamington Spa, and Stratford-on-Avon, the Urban District of Kenilworth, the Rural Districts of Warwick and Alcester, and parts of the Rural Districts of Stratford-on-Avon and Brailes.

1950–1974: The Boroughs of Warwick and Royal Leamington Spa, the Urban District of Kenilworth, and the Rural District of Warwick.

1974–1983: As 1950 but with redrawn boundaries.

1983–1997: The District of Warwick wards of Bishop's Tachbrook, Brunswick, Budbrooke, Clarendon, Crown, Cubbington, Lapworth, Leek Wootton, Manor, Milverton, Radford Semele, Warwick North, Warwick South, Warwick West, Whitnash, and Willes.

1997–2010: The District of Warwick wards of Bishop's Tachbrook, Brunswick, Budbrooke, Clarendon, Crown, Cubbington, Lapworth, Leek Wootton, Manor, Milverton, Radford Semele, Warwick North, Warwick South, Warwick West, Whitnash, and Willes, and the District of Stratford-on-Avon wards of Henley, Tanworth, and Tanworth Earlswood.

2010–2024: The District of Warwick wards of Bishop's Tachbrook, Brunswick, Budbrooke, Clarendon, Crown, Manor, Milverton, Warwick North, Warwick South, Warwick West, Whitnash, and Willes.

The 2010 boundary changes reduced the constituency's area by removing outlying villages, reflecting population and housing growth.

2024–present: The District of Warwick wards of: Bishop’s Tachbrook; Leamington Brunswick; Leamington Clarendon; Leamington Lillington; Leamington Milverton; Leamington Willes; Radford Semele; Warwick All Saints and Woodloes; Warwick Aylesford; Warwick Myton & Heathcote; Warwick Saltisford; Whitnash.

Minor changes to align boundaries with those of wards in the District of Warwick. Budbrooke transferred to Kenilworth and Southam in exchange for Radford Semele.

== Constituency profile ==
The seat comprises the two eponymous towns, with modest hills surrounding them, in the upper valley of the River Avon.

The towns of Warwick and Royal Leamington Spa are still distinct, however, and form, in the modern seat, a contiguous urban area. Both towns are relatively affluent, although there are pockets of deprivation in Leamington. Warwick, with its historic castle, is an internationally advertised tourist destination, while Leamington's economy is more dependent on storage, distribution, manufacturing, processing, engineering and industry. Leamington is also more ethnically diverse (e.g. five per cent of the constituency's population is of Asian ethnicity) and is home to some students of the University of Warwick that lies close to Coventry.

Unemployment claimants who were registered jobseekers were in November 2012 significantly lower than the national average of 3.8%, at 2.2% of the population based on a statistical compilation by The Guardian.

== History ==
The constituency was created under the Redistribution of Seats Act 1885, partially replacing the earlier and ancient Warwick constituency which until that year had sent two MPs to Westminster.

=== Political history ===
Represented solely by Members of Parliament from the Conservative Party for 87 years from 1910 to 1997, the seat was for much of this time a safe seat; seeing frequent majorities of more than 10,000 votes, and the seat was uncontested at both the 1918 and 1922 general elections. The seat had not been expected to change hands at the 1997 general election: as such James Plaskitt's defeat of Dudley Smith was a Portillo moment, without the decapitation of a government frontbencher. Plaskitt increased his majority at the 2001 general election, but on a lower turnout. At the 2005 general election, Warwick and Leamington was 85th on the Conservative list of target seats, meaning that to gain it they would have required a somewhat greater swing than was seen nationally. With a greater swing from Labour to the Liberal Democrats, Plaskitt narrowly retained the seat with a majority slashed from nearly 6,000 votes to a mere 266.

However, minor boundary changes in Labour's favour took effect at the 2010 general election and the winner was variously predicted. In 2010, the seat was gained by a Conservative, Chris White, with a majority of 7% of the vote. On this occasion, the Conservative Party was the main beneficiary from swings away from the Labour Party and the Green Party. White held the seat in 2015 with an increased majority of 6,606 votes. The Labour candidate, Matt Western gained the seat from the Conservatives on a swing of 7.6% at the 2017 snap general election, overturning a majority of 6,606 votes. (this was the fourth-largest lead overturned by Labour at the 2017 general election). This made Matt Western the second MP for Warwick and Leamington from the Labour Party in the history of the constituency. At the 2019 general election, Western held the seat with a slightly reduced majority, and in 2024 Western was re-elected with an increased majority of 12,412 votes, the largest majority for a Labour candidate in the seat's history.

=== Prominent members ===
From 1923 to 1957, the seat was represented by Anthony Eden, who served as Prime Minister of the United Kingdom from 1955 to 1957.

For part of the early 1920s, the Solicitor General for England and Wales, then Attorney General for England and Wales, represented the seat, Sir Ernest Pollock. Eden's successor, Sir John Hobson, was also in all of those senior positions for part of the early-1960s.

== Members of Parliament ==
Warwick prior to 1885

Election	Member	Party	Notes
1885	Arthur Peel	Liberal	Speaker of the House of Commons 1884–95
1886	Arthur Peel	Liberal Unionist	Speaker of the House of Commons 1884–95
1895 by-election	Alfred Lyttelton	Liberal Unionist	
1906	Thomas Berridge	Liberal	
Jan 1910	Ernest Pollock	Conservative	Solicitor General then Attorney General (1919–1922)
1923	Sir Anthony Eden	Conservative	Leader of the Conservative Party and Prime Minister (1955–1957), resigned January 1957
1957 by-election	John Hobson	Conservative	Solicitor General then Attorney General (1962–1964), died December 1967
1968 by-election	Dudley Smith	Conservative	
1997	James Plaskitt	Labour	
2010	Chris White	Conservative	
2017	Matt Western	Labour	

== Elections ==
=== Elections in the 2020s ===
General election 2024: Warwick and Leamington
Party	Candidate	Votes	%	±%
Labour	Matt Western	23,975	48.7	+5.4
Conservative	James Uffindell	11,563	23.5	−17.6
Reform	Nigel Clarke	5,154	10.5	+9.1
Green	Hema YellaPragada	4,471	9.1	+6.2
Liberal Democrats	Louis Adam	3,881	7.9	−3.0
UKIP	Laurie Steele	154	0.3	New
Majority		12,412	25.2	+23.7
Turnout		49,198	64.5	−6.5
Labour hold		Swing	+11.6	

=== Elections in the 2010s ===
General election 2019: Warwick and Leamington
Party	Candidate	Votes	%	±%
Labour	Matt Western	23,718	43.8	−2.9
Conservative	Jack Rankin	22,929	42.3	−2.1
Liberal Democrats	Louis Adam	4,995	9.2	+4.0
Green	Jonathan Chilvers	1,536	2.8	+0.6
Brexit Party	Tim Griffiths	807	1.5	New
Independent	Bob Dhillon	153	0.3	New
SDP	Xander Bennett	67	0.1	New
Majority		789	1.5	−0.8
Turnout		54,205	71.0	−1.8
Labour hold		Swing	−0.4	

General election 2017: Warwick and Leamington
Party	Candidate	Votes	%	±%
Labour	Matt Western	25,227	46.7	+11.8
Conservative	Chris White	24,021	44.4	−3.5
Liberal Democrats	Nick Solman	2,810	5.2	+0.2
Green	Jonathan Chilvers	1,198	2.2	−1.7
UKIP	Bob Dhillon	799	1.5	−6.8
Majority		1,206	2.3	N/A
Turnout		54,160	72.8	+2.1
Labour gain from Conservative		Swing	+7.6	

General election 2015: Warwick and Leamington
Party	Candidate	Votes	%	±%
Conservative	Chris White	24,249	47.9	+5.3
Labour	Lynnette Kelly	17,643	34.9	−0.5
UKIP	Alastair MacBrayne	4,183	8.3	+6.4
Liberal Democrats	Haseeb Arif	2,512	5.0	−13.3
Green	Azzees Minott	1,994	3.9	+2.5
Majority		6,606	13.0	+5.8
Turnout		50,770	70.7	−0.3
Conservative hold		Swing	+2.5	

General election 2010: Warwick and Leamington
Party	Candidate	Votes	%	±%
Conservative	Chris White	20,876	42.6	+8.2
Labour	James Plaskitt	17,363	35.4	−9.3
Liberal Democrats	Alan Beddow	8,977	18.3	+2.4
UKIP	Christopher Lenton	926	1.9	+0.2
Green	Ian Davison	693	1.4	−1.9
Independent	Jim Cullinane	197	0.4	New
Majority		3,513	7.2	N/A
Turnout		49,032	71.0	+5.3
Conservative gain from Labour		Swing	+8.75	

=== Elections in the 2000s ===
General election 2005: Warwick and Leamington
Party	Candidate	Votes	%	±%
Labour	James Plaskitt	22,238	40.6	−8.2
Conservative	Chris White	21,972	40.1	+2.5
Liberal Democrats	Linda Forbes	8,119	14.8	+3.7
Green	Ian Davison	1,534	2.8	New
UKIP	Greville Warwick	921	1.7	+0.5
Majority		266	0.5	−10.7
Turnout		54,744	67.4	+1.6
Labour hold		Swing	−5.4	

General election 2001: Warwick and Leamington
Party	Candidate	Votes	%	±%
Labour	James Plaskitt	26,108	48.8	+4.3
Conservative	David Campbell-Bannerman	20,155	37.6	−1.3
Liberal Democrats	Linda Forbes	5,964	11.1	−0.8
Socialist Alliance	Claire Kime	664	1.2	New
UKIP	Greville Warwick	648	1.2	New
Majority		5,953	11.2	+5.6
Turnout		53,539	65.8	−9.3
Labour hold		Swing	+2.8	

=== Elections in the 1990s ===
General election 1997: Warwick and Leamington
Party	Candidate	Votes	%	±%
Labour	James Plaskitt	26,747	44.5	+11.5
Conservative	Dudley Smith	23,349	38.9	−9.5
Liberal Democrats	Nigel Hicks	7,133	11.9	−4.7
Referendum	Val Davis	1,484	2.5	New
Green	Paul Baptie	764	1.3	−0.1
Independent	Greville Warwick	306	0.5	New
Independent	Michael Gibbs	183	0.3	New
Natural Law	Roddy McCarthy	125	0.2	−0.1
Majority		3,398	5.6	N/A
Turnout		60,091	75.1	−6.5
Labour gain from Conservative		Swing	+10.5	

General election 1992: Warwick and Leamington
Party	Candidate	Votes	%	±%
Conservative	Dudley Smith	28,093	48.4	−1.4
Labour	Matthew Taylor	19,158	33.0	+9.5
Liberal Democrats	S. Boad	9,645	16.6	−7.9
Green	Janet Alty	803	1.4	−0.8
Independent	R. Newby	251	0.4	New
Natural Law	J. Brewster	156	0.3	New
Majority		8,935	15.4	−9.9
Turnout		58,106	81.6	−5.6
Conservative hold		Swing	−5.5	

=== Elections in the 1980s ===
General election 1987: Warwick and Leamington
Party	Candidate	Votes	%	±%
Conservative	Dudley Smith	27,530	49.8	−1.1
Alliance	Kevin O'Sullivan	13,548	24.5	−1.4
Labour	Ann Christina	13,019	23.5	+1.5
Green	Janet Alty	1,214	2.2	+0.9
Majority		13,982	25.3	+0.3
Turnout		55,311	76.0	+2.4
Conservative hold		Swing	−1.3	

General election 1983: Warwick and Leamington
Party	Candidate	Votes	%	±%
Conservative	Dudley Smith	26,512	50.9	−3.5
Alliance	Robert Behrens	13,480	25.9	+10.9
Labour	Richard Chessum	11,463	22.0	−7.3
Ecology	Nicholas Charlton	685	1.3	−0.1
Majority		13,032	25.0	−0.1
Turnout		52,140	73.6	−4.1
Conservative hold		Swing	−7.2	

=== Elections in the 1970s ===
General election 1979: Warwick and Leamington
Party	Candidate	Votes	%	±%
Conservative	Dudley Smith	35,925	54.4	+7.3
Labour	C. J. Gray	19,367	29.3	−3.8
Liberal	D. Woodcock	9,905	15.0	−4.8
Ecology	P. Sizer	905	1.4	New
Majority		16,558	25.1	+11.1
Turnout		66,102	77.7	+2.9
Conservative hold		Swing	+5.6	

General election October 1974: Warwick and Leamington
Party	Candidate	Votes	%	±%
Conservative	Dudley Smith	27,721	47.1	−0.4
Labour	J. W. England	19,476	33.1	+3.4
Liberal	Timothy A. Jones	11,625	19.8	−3.0
Majority		8,245	14.0	−3.8
Turnout		58,822	74.8	−6.8
Conservative hold		Swing	−1.9	

General election February 1974: Warwick and Leamington
Party	Candidate	Votes	%	±%
Conservative	Dudley Smith	30,167	47.5	−15.9
Labour	J. W. England	18,874	29.7	−6.9
Liberal	Timothy A. Jones	14,500	22.8	New
Majority		11,293	17.8	−9.0
Turnout		63,541	81.6	+9.0
Conservative hold		Swing	−19.4	

General election 1970: Warwick and Leamington
Party	Candidate	Votes	%	±%
Conservative	Dudley Smith	36,994	63.4	+11.8
Labour	John Watkinson	21,355	36.6	+0.5
Majority		15,639	26.8	+11.3
Turnout		58,349	72.6	−6.3
Conservative hold		Swing	−12.5	

=== Elections in the 1960s ===
1968 Warwick and Leamington by-election
Party	Candidate	Votes	%	±%
Conservative	Dudley Smith	28,914	68.3	+16.7
Labour	Raymond Carter	6,992	16.5	−19.6
Liberal	Antony Butcher	6,415	15.2	+2.9
Majority		21,922	51.8	+36.3
Turnout		42,321		
Conservative hold		Swing	+18.2	

General election 1966: Warwick and Leamington
Party	Candidate	Votes	%	±%
Conservative	John Hobson	28,918	51.6	−2.2
Labour	Les Huckfield	20,221	36.1	+2.0
Liberal	Antony Butcher	6,912	12.3	+0.2
Majority		8,697	15.5	−4.2
Turnout		56,051	78.9	−1.5
Conservative hold		Swing	−2.1	

General election 1964: Warwick and Leamington
Party	Candidate	Votes	%	±%
Conservative	John Hobson	29,749	53.8	−8.8
Labour	Nigel Spearing	18,865	34.1	−3.3
Liberal	Peter Gibson	6,676	12.1	New
Majority		10,884	19.7	−5.5
Turnout		55,290	80.4	−2.3
Conservative hold		Swing	−10.5	

=== Elections in the 1950s ===
General election 1959: Warwick and Leamington
Party	Candidate	Votes	%	±%
Conservative	John Hobson	32,513	62.59	−1.89
Labour	William Wilson	19,434	37.41	+1.89
Majority		13,079	25.18	−3.78
Turnout		51,947	82.7	
Conservative hold		Swing		

1957 Warwick and Leamington by-election
Party	Candidate	Votes	%	±%
Conservative	John Hobson	24,948	52.26	−12.22
Labour	William Wilson	22,791	47.74	+12.22
Majority		2,157	4.52	−24.44
Turnout		47,739		
Conservative hold		Swing	−12.2	

General election 1955: Warwick and Leamington
Party	Candidate	Votes	%	±%
Conservative	Anthony Eden	29,979	64.48	+4.0
Labour	William Wilson	16,513	35.52	−4.0
Majority		13,466	28.96	
Turnout		46,492	78.77	
Conservative hold		Swing	+4.0	

General election 1951: Warwick and Leamington
Party	Candidate	Votes	%	±%
Conservative	Anthony Eden	28,282	60.48	+0.7
Labour	William Wilson	18,479	39.52	−0.7
Majority		9,803	20.96	
Turnout		46,761	82.38	
Conservative hold		Swing	+0.7	

General election 1950: Warwick and Leamington
Party	Candidate	Votes	%	±%
Conservative	Anthony Eden	27,353	59.78	−1.5
Labour	H. Bithell	18,400	40.22	+8.0
Majority		8,953	19.56	
Turnout		45,753	82.86	
Conservative hold		Swing	−4.8	

=== Elections in the 1940s ===
General election 1945: Warwick and Leamington
Party	Candidate	Votes	%	±%
Conservative	Anthony Eden	37,110	61.34	−15.3
Labour	Donald Chesworth	19,476	32.19	+8.8
Liberal	Walter Dingley	3,908	6.46	New
Majority		17,634	29.15	
Turnout		60,494	69.18	
Conservative hold		Swing	−12.1	

General Election 1939–40: Another General Election was required to take place before the end of 1940. The political parties had been making preparations for an election to take place from 1939 and by the end of this year, the following candidates had been selected;

- Conservative: Anthony Eden
- Liberal: Walter Dingley
- Labour: Theodore Besterman

=== Elections in the 1930s ===
General election 1935: Warwick and Leamington
Party	Candidate	Votes	%	±%
Conservative	Anthony Eden	35,746	76.58	−4.0
Labour	J. Perry	10,930	23.42	+4.0
Majority		24,816	53.16	
Turnout		46,676	65.66	
Conservative hold		Swing	−4.0	

General election 1931: Warwick and Leamington
Party	Candidate	Votes	%	±%
Conservative	Anthony Eden	38,584	80.64	
Independent Labour	Jim Garton	9,261	19.36	
Majority		29,323	61.28	
Turnout		47,845	72.43	
Conservative hold		Swing		

=== Elections in the 1920s ===
General election 1929: Warwick and Leamington
Party	Candidate	Votes	%	±%
Unionist	Anthony Eden	23,045	47.6	−12.6
Liberal	Walter Dingley	17,585	36.4	−3.4
Labour	Jim Garton	7,741	16.0	New
Majority		5,460	11.2	−9.2
Turnout		48,371	77.5	+3.9
Unionist hold		Swing	−4.6	

General election 1924: Warwick and Leamington
Party	Candidate	Votes	%	±%
Unionist	Anthony Eden	19,575	60.2	+8.4
Liberal	George Nicholls	12,966	39.8	+4.4
Majority		6,609	20.4	+4.0
Turnout		32,541	73.6	+0.7
Unionist hold		Swing	+2.0	

General election 1923: Warwick and Leamington
Party	Candidate	Votes	%	±%
Unionist	Anthony Eden	16,337	51.8	N/A
Liberal	George Nicholls	11,134	35.4	New
Labour	Daisy Greville	4,015	12.8	New
Majority		5,203	16.4	N/A
Turnout		31,486	72.9	N/A
Unionist hold		Swing	N/A	

General election 1922: Warwick and Leamington
Party	Candidate	Votes	%	±%
Unionist	Ernest Pollock	Unopposed		
Unionist hold				

=== Elections in the 1910s ===
General election 1918: Warwick and Leamington
Party		Candidate	Votes	%	±%
C	Unionist	Ernest Pollock	Unopposed		
	Unionist hold				
C indicates candidate endorsed by the coalition government.

General election December 1910: Warwick and Leamington
Party	Candidate	Votes	%	±%
Conservative	Ernest Pollock	3,321	56.1	−1.5
Liberal	Thomas Berridge	2,596	43.9	+1.5
Majority		725	12.2	−3.0
Turnout		5,917	89.1	−5.1
Registered electors		6,642		
Conservative hold		Swing	−1.5	

General election January 1910: Warwick and Leamington
Party	Candidate	Votes	%	±%
Conservative	Ernest Pollock	3,605	57.6	+9.4
Liberal	Thomas Berridge	2,651	42.4	−9.4
Majority		954	15.2	N/A
Turnout		6,256	94.2	+1.9
Registered electors		6,642		
Conservative gain from Liberal		Swing	+9.4	

=== Elections in the 1900s ===
General election 1906: Warwick and Leamington
Party	Candidate	Votes	%	±%
Liberal	Thomas Berridge	3,011	51.8	+10.6
Liberal Unionist	Alfred Lyttelton	2,802	48.2	−10.6
Majority		209	3.6	N/A
Turnout		5,813	92.3	+12.2
Registered electors		6,296		
Liberal gain from Liberal Unionist		Swing	+10.6	

1903 Warwick and Leamington by-election
Party	Candidate	Votes	%	±%
Liberal Unionist	Alfred Lyttelton	2,689	51.8	−7.0
Liberal	Thomas Berridge	2,499	48.2	+7.0
Majority		190	3.6	−14.0
Turnout		5,188	86.5	+6.4
Registered electors		5,999		
Liberal Unionist hold		Swing	−7.0	

General election 1900: Warwick and Leamington
Party	Candidate	Votes	%	±%
Liberal Unionist	Alfred Lyttelton	2,785	58.8	N/A
Liberal	Halford Mackinder	1,954	41.2	New
Majority		831	17.6	N/A
Turnout		4,739	80.1	N/A
Registered electors		5,920		
Liberal Unionist hold		Swing	N/A	

=== Elections in the 1890s ===
General election 1895: Warwick and Leamington
Party	Candidate	Votes	%	±%
Liberal Unionist	Alfred Lyttelton	Unopposed		
Liberal Unionist hold				

1895 Warwick and Leamington by-election
Party	Candidate	Votes	%	±%
Liberal Unionist	Alfred Lyttelton	2,815	55.7	N/A
Liberal	James Duckworth	2,236	44.3	New
Majority		579	11.4	N/A
Turnout		3,394	86.2	N/A
Registered electors		5,858		
Liberal Unionist hold		Swing	N/A	

- Caused by Peel's elevation to the peerage, becoming Viscount Peel.

General election 1892: Warwick and Leamington
Party	Candidate	Votes	%	±%
Speaker (Liberal Unionist)	Arthur Peel	Unopposed		
Speaker hold				

=== Elections in the 1880s ===
General election 1886: Warwick and Leamington
Party	Candidate	Votes	%	±%
Speaker (Liberal Unionist)	Arthur Peel	Unopposed		
Speaker hold				

General election 1885: Warwick and Leamington
Party	Candidate	Votes	%	±%
Speaker (Liberal)	Arthur Peel	2,644	53.8	
Conservative	Edward Montague Nelson	2,272	46.2	
Majority		372	7.6	
Turnout		4,916	89.6	
Registered electors		5,486		
Speaker win (new seat)				

== See also ==
- Parliamentary constituencies in Warwickshire
- Parliamentary constituencies in the West Midlands (region)

== Notes ==
Parliament of the United Kingdom
Preceded by Warwick	Constituency represented by the speaker 1885–1895	Succeeded by Carlisle
Preceded by Woodford	Constituency represented by the prime minister 1955–1957	Succeeded by Bromley
