= John Hobson (politician) =

British politician (1912-1967)

The Right Honourable Sir John Hobson OBE TD QC

Shadow Attorney General for England and Wales
- In office 16 October 1964 – 4 December 1967
- Leader: Alec Douglas-Home; Edward Heath
- Preceded by: Frank Soskice
- Succeeded by: Peter Rawlinson

Attorney General for England and Wales
- In office 16 July 1962 – 16 October 1964
- Prime Minister: Harold Macmillan; Alec Douglas-Home
- Preceded by: Sir Reginald Manningham-Buller
- Succeeded by: Sir Elwyn Jones

Solicitor General for England and Wales
- In office 8 February 1962 – 19 July 1962
- Prime Minister: Harold Macmillan
- Preceded by: Sir Jocelyn Simon
- Succeeded by: Sir Peter Rawlinson

Member of Parliament for Warwick and Leamington
- In office 7 March 1957 – 4 December 1967
- Preceded by: Sir Anthony Eden
- Succeeded by: Dudley Smith

Personal details
- Born: John Gardiner Sumner Hobson; 18 April 1912 Melton Mowbray, Leicestershire, England
- Died: 4 December 1967 (aged 55) London, England
- Party: Conservative
- Education: Harrow School
- Alma mater: Brasenose College, Oxford

Sir John Gardiner Sumner Hobson, OBE, TD, PC, QC (18 April 1912 – 4 December 1967) was a British Conservative Party politician.

== Life and career ==
Hobson was born in Melton Mowbray, the son of an officer in the 12th Royal Lancers. Hobson was educated at Harrow and Brasenose College, Oxford, graduating with a second-class degree in History in 1934. Hobson was called to the bar by the Inner Temple in 1938. He became a Queen's Counsel in 1957, and was Recorder of Northampton from 1958 to 1962. During World War II he served with the Northamptonshire Yeomanry, reaching the rank of lieutenant colonel. For his military service, he was appointed OBE and mentioned in dispatches.

He was first elected to the House of Commons at a 1957 by-election in the Warwick and Leamington constituency, caused by the resignation due to ill-health of the Conservative MP and former Prime Minister, Anthony Eden. He held the seat at the next three general elections. In 1959 Hobson represented suspected serial-killer Dr John Bodkin Adams in his failed attempt to be reinstated as a doctor.

He was appointed Solicitor General in 1962, receiving the customary knighthood, and serving in that post for five months before taking over as Attorney General until the Conservatives lost the 1964 general election. In 1962 he led the prosecution of the spy John Vassall. He was appointed to the Privy Council in 1963.

He approved the "sordid deal" whereby Anthony Blunt was given immunity from prosecution

== Death ==
He died in London on 4 December 1967, from a previously undiagnosed brain tumour.

Parliament of the United Kingdom
Preceded by Anthony Eden	Member of Parliament for Warwick and Leamington; 1957–1967	Succeeded by Dudley Smith
Legal offices
Preceded by Jocelyn Simon	Solicitor General for England and Wales; February 1962 – July 1962	Succeeded by Peter Rawlinson
Preceded by Sir Reginald Manningham-Buller	Attorney General for England and Wales; 1962–1964	Succeeded by Sir Elwyn Jones
