= Thomas Berridge =

British Liberal politician and solicitor (1857-1924)

Sir Thomas Berridge KBE
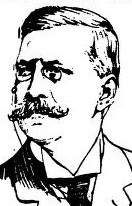

Member of Parliament for Warwick and Leamington
- In office 8 February 1906 – 10 February 1910
- Preceded by: Alfred Lyttelton
- Succeeded by: Ernest Pollock

Personal details
- Born: 6 July 1857
- Died: 24 October 1924 (aged 67) Sandgate, Kent, United Kingdom
- Citizenship: British
- Party: Liberal
- Spouse: Agnes Campion (m. 1887; died 1909)
- Children: 2
- Education: Upholland Grammar School

Sir Thomas Henry Devereux Berridge, KBE (6 July 1857 – 24 October 1924) was a British Liberal politician and solicitor.

== Family and education ==
Berridge was the son of the Reverend W Berridge the Vicar of Lowton St. Mary's in Lancashire. He was educated privately and at Upholland Grammar School where his father was the headmaster. In 1887 Berridge married Agnes Campion from Redhill. Mrs. Berridge suffered from heart problems in later life and while apparently in good health and spirits was taken ill suddenly at a dance in Kensington and died in a few minutes in February 1909. They had one son and one daughter.

== Solicitor ==
Berridge went into the law and was articled to Maskell Peace, solicitors of Wigan, who were the solicitors to the Mining Association of Great Britain. In 1878 he was admitted as a solicitor. In 1882 he became a partner in the firm of Burn & Berridge, solicitors to the government of Newfoundland. He was a member and later Master of the Court of the City of London Solicitors' Company of which David Lloyd George was also a member.

== Political and public life ==
Like most middle-class men of his time, Berridge took an interest in public affairs. He was some time Chairman of the Law and Parliamentary Committee of the Board of Works for the St Giles District in London and he wanted a full-time career in politics. In 1904, he was Honorary Secretary of a committee of leading Liberal organisations set up to honour the retirement of Sir William Harcourt and commissioned two portraits of Sir William painted one for the family and the other to hang in the National Liberal Club.

=== Warwick & Leamington by-election, 1903 ===
In the summer of 1902 there were rumours of a possible vacancy in the constituency of Warwick and Leamington when the sitting Liberal Unionist member Alfred Lyttelton was tipped for an appointment to be a Judge or Governor of a British Colony. In the event this did not happen but it provided the opportunity for Berridge to associate himself with the constituency. In 1903 however Lyttelton was appointed Secretary of State for the Colonies and the Parliamentary regulations of the day required him to contest a by-election. Berridge was adopted as Liberal candidate. There was some initial suggestion that Lyttelton should not be opposed but the local Liberal Association decided there were good precedents for such a contest and wished to have the chance of opposing the government on its policies. Besides, Alfred Lyttelton was to succeed Joseph Chamberlain as Colonial Secretary and the Warwick & Leamington seat being so close to Chamberlain's Birmingham stronghold it was considered by the Liberals as something of a "rotten borough" which Chamberlain felt he could dispose of as he wished, and this was added reason for the Liberals' wish to stand a candidate. The by-election resulted in a Unionist majority of 190 for Lyttelton over Berridge on a turnout of 86%. This contrasted to Lyttelton's majority of 831 at the previous general election in 1900.

=== General Election of 1906 ===
Berridge remained the local Liberal candidate after the by-election and when the new Liberal prime minister Henry Campbell-Bannerman announced the dissolution of Parliament on 16 December 1905 and called a general election for January 1906, Warwick and Leamington Liberal Association was quick to adopt Berridge formally as Liberal and free-trade candidate at a meeting on 18 December.

On 12 January 1906, Lloyd George came to a public meeting in Leamington to speak for Berridge but due to a large number of Unionist supporters (many imported from Birmingham) causing disruption and noise and singing patriotic songs in the hall, he was never able to make himself heard and had to leave and make his speech to a smaller gathering of Liberals at another location.

Benefitting from the surge in support for the Liberal Party at the general election, Berridge won Warwick and Leamington with a majority of 209 votes, removing Lyttelton from the House of Commons, at least for a few weeks until he was returned unopposed at a by-election for the seat of St George's, Hanover Square in Westminster. Berridge remained MP for Warwick and Leamington for four years until the general election of January 1910 when he was defeated by the Conservative Ernest Pollock. In March 1910 Berridge gave his constituency party notice that he was unlikely to contest the next election after his defeat but he did in fact agree to stand at the December 1910 general election although he again lost to Pollock.

== Honours ==
Berridge was knighted in 1912 and made a KBE in 1920 for his war work, in particular for his chairmanship of the executive committee of the Royal Flying Corps later the Royal Air Force Voluntary Hospitals between 1916 and 1919.

== Death ==
Berridge died in a nursing home at Sandgate, Kent at the age of 67 on 24 October 1924.

Parliament of the United Kingdom
Preceded by Alfred Lyttelton	Member of Parliament for Warwick and Leamington; 1906–January 1910	Succeeded by Ernest Pollock
