= 2023 Coventry City Council election =

2023 local election in Coventry

← 2022	4 May 2023	2024 →

18 out of 54 seats to Coventry City Council 28 seats needed for a majority

	First party	Second party	Third party
Leader	George Duggins	Gary Ridley	N/A
Party	Labour	Conservative	Green
Last election	39 seats, 48.1%	14 seats, 29.3%	1 seat, 10.4%
Seats before	38	15	1
Seats after	37	15	2
Seat change	▼1	Steady	▲1
- Winner of each seat at the 2023 Coventry City Council election
Leader before election
George Duggins
Labour
Leader after election
George Duggins
Labour

The 2023 Coventry City Council election took place on 4 May 2023. One third of councillors — 18 out of 54 — on Coventry City Council was elected. The election took place alongside other local elections across the United Kingdom.

The Labour Party retained its majority on the council, although it did lose one seat to the Green Party.

== Background ==
=== History ===
The Local Government Act 1972 created a two-tier system of metropolitan counties and districts covering Greater Manchester, Merseyside, South Yorkshire, Tyne and Wear, the West Midlands, and West Yorkshire starting in 1974. Coventry was a district of the West Midlands metropolitan county. The Local Government Act 1985 abolished the metropolitan counties, with metropolitan districts taking on most of their powers as metropolitan boroughs. The West Midlands Combined Authority was created in 2016 and began electing the mayor of the West Midlands from 2017, which was given strategic powers covering a region coterminous with the former West Midlands metropolitan county.

Coventry Council has variously been under Labour control, Conservative control and no overall control since it was established. Labour most recently gained control of the council in the 2010 election, when they gained six seats at the expense of the Conservatives and Socialist Alternative. Labour continued to make gains to consolidate its majority on the council in the 2011 and 2012 elections, since when the party's position has remained stable. In the 2022 Coventry City Council election, Labour won 13 of the seats up for election with 48.1% of the vote, the Conservatives won five seats with 29.3% of the vote, and the Greens won one seat with 10.4% of the vote. Labour maintained its majority on the council.

Positions up for election in 2023 were last elected in 2019. In that election, Labour won fourteen seats and the Conservatives won four seats.

Labour retained its majority on the council.

=== Electoral process ===
The council elects its councillors in thirds, with a third being up for election every year for three years, with no election in the fourth year. The election will take place by first-past-the-post voting, with wards being represented by three councillors, with one councillor elected in each ward each election year to serve a four-year term.

All registered electors (British, Irish, Commonwealth and European Union citizens) living in Coventry aged 18 or over will be entitled to vote in the election. People who live at two addresses in different councils, such as university students with different term-time and holiday addresses, are entitled to be registered for and vote in elections in both local authorities. Voting in-person at polling stations will take place from 07:00 to 22:00 on election day, and voters will be able to apply for postal votes or proxy votes in advance of the election. People voting in this election in Coventry only vote for a councillor in the ward they reside.

== Previous council composition ==
After 2022 election		Before 2023 election	
Party	Seats	Party	Seats
Labour	39	Labour	38
Conservative	14	Conservative	15
Green	1	Green	1

== Summary ==
=== Election result ===
Coventry City Council's composition following the 2023 election.

2023 Coventry City Council election
Party	This election			Full council			This election		
Party	Seats	Net	Seats %	Other	Total	Total %	Votes	Votes %	+/−
Labour	13	▼1	72.2	24	37	68.5	31,304	50.4	+2.3
Conservative	4	Steady	22.2	11	15	27.8	18,301	29.5	+0.2
Green	1	▲1	5.6	1	2	3.7	5,802	9.3	–1.1
Coventry Citizens	0	Steady	0.0	0	0	0.0	3,007	4.8	+0.4
Liberal Democrats	0	Steady	0.0	0	0	0.0	2,110	3.4	+0.3
TUSC	0	Steady	0.0	0	0	0.0	1,349	2.2	+0.7
ADF	0	Steady	0.0	0	0	0.0	110	0.2	±0.0
Reform UK	0	Steady	0.0	0	0	0.0	93	0.1	N/A

== Ward results ==
Asterisks denote incumbent councillors seeking re-election.

=== Bablake ===
Bablake (1)
Party	Candidate	Votes	%	±%
Conservative	Tarlochan Jandu*	1,770	46.2	–3.8
Labour Co-op	Beatriec Christopher	1,393	36.4	+2.9
Green	Niall Webb	283	7.4	+0.4
Liberal Democrats	Russell Field	186	4.9	+0.1
Coventry Citizens	Tony Middleton	180	4.7	±0.0
TUSC	Ted Woodley	20	0.5	N/A
Majority		377	9.8	
Rejected ballots		8		
Turnout		3,832		
Conservative hold		Swing	▼3.4	

=== Binley and Willenhall ===
Binley and Willenhall (1)
Party	Candidate	Votes	%	±%
Labour	Ram Lakha*	1,380	45.3	+4.0
Coventry Citizens	Paul Cowley	970	31.8	+12.5
Conservative	Akpevwe Odje	540	17.7	–11.2
ADF	Marianne-Angela Fitzgerald	110	3.6	+0.2
TUSC	Michael Morgan	47	1.5	N/A
Majority		410	13.5	
Rejected ballots		17		
Turnout		3,047		
Labour hold		Swing	▼4.3	

=== Cheylesmore ===
Cheylesmore (1)
Party	Candidate	Votes	%	±%
Labour	Richard Brown*	1,671	44.3	+5.5
Conservative	Amarjit Khangura	1,487	39.4	–7.6
Green	Bruce Tetlow	263	7.0	+1.4
Liberal Democrats	Anna Richmond	174	4.6	–0.3
Coventry Citizens	Ian Stringfellow	124	3.3	+1.2
TUSC	Judy Griffiths	53	1.4	–0.2
Majority		184	4.9	
Rejected ballots		16		
Turnout		3,772		
Labour hold		Swing	▲6.6	

=== Earlsdon ===
Earlsdon (1)
Party	Candidate	Votes	%	±%
Labour Co-op	Becky Gittins*	2,627	52.3	–0.7
Conservative	Zaid Rehman	1,467	29.2	+0.2
Liberal Democrats	Stephen Richmond	367	7.3	–1.6
Green	John Finlayson	350	7.0	+2.3
Coventry Citizens	Cameron Baxter	148	2.9	–0.5
TUSC	Adam Harmsworth	66	1.3	+0.4
Majority		1,160	23.1	
Rejected ballots		17		
Turnout		5,025		
Labour hold		Swing	▼0.5	

=== Foleshill ===
Foleshill (1)
Party	Candidate	Votes	%	±%
Labour	Abdul Khan*	2,409	78.5	+32.5
Conservative	Ken Taylor	446	14.5	+5.0
TUSC	Mila Matharu	213	6.9	N/A
Majority		1,963	64.0	
Rejected ballots		26		
Turnout		3,068		
Labour hold		Swing	▲13.8	

=== Henley ===
Henley (1)
Party	Candidate	Votes	%	±%
Labour	Patricia Seaman*	2,017	62.6	+7.8
Conservative	Farzad Misaghi	659	20.5	–7.7
Green	Cathy Wattebot	279	8.7	±0.0
Coventry Citizens	Thomas Watts	215	6.7	+0.3
TUSC	Aidan O'Toole	51	1.6	–0.3
Majority		1,358	42.1	
Rejected ballots		21		
Turnout		3,242		
Labour hold		Swing	▲7.8	

=== Holbrook ===
Holbrook (1)
Party	Candidate	Votes	%	±%
Green	Esther Reeves	1,566	44.6	–6.7
Labour Co-op	Lynette Kelly	1,487	42.4	+3.1
Conservative	Mike Ballinger	396	11.3	+4.2
TUSC	Jim Hensman	60	1.7	+0.9
Majority		79	2.2	
Rejected ballots		18		
Turnout		3,509		
Green gain from Labour Co-op		Swing	▼4.9	

=== Longford ===
Longford (1)
Party	Candidate	Votes	%	±%
Labour	Linda Bigham*	1,991	67.6	+6.7
Conservative	William Sidhu	521	17.7	–2.1
Green	Danny Foulstone	228	7.7	–1.4
Coventry Citizens	Sian Williamson	150	5.1	+0.5
TUSC	Alan Checklin	56	1.9	N/A
Majority		1,470	49.9	
Rejected ballots		14		
Turnout		2,960		
Labour hold		Swing	▲4.4	

=== Lower Stoke ===
Lower Stoke (1)
Party	Candidate	Votes	%	±%
Labour Co-op	John McNicholas	2,142	55.6	–3.9
Conservative	Pratibha Reddy	890	23.1	+2.0
Green	Thomas Jewell	335	8.7	–1.8
Liberal Democrats	Andre Escorio Rodrigues Soares	201	5.2	N/A
Coventry Citizens	Dani Stringfellow	190	4.9	–0.6
TUSC	John O'Sullivan	93	2.4	–1.0
Majority		1,252	32.5	
Rejected ballots		14		
Turnout		3,865		
Labour Co-op hold		Swing	▼3.0	

=== Radford ===
Radford (1)
Party	Candidate	Votes	%	±%
Labour	Maya Ali*	1,686	60.1	–1.0
Conservative	Muhammad Tariq	535	19.1	–1.2
Green	Julie Spriddle	266	9.5	+0.7
Coventry Citizens	Marcus Fogden	199	7.1	+1.2
TUSC	Dave Anderson	118	4.2	+0.3
Majority		1,151	41.0	
Rejected ballots		20		
Turnout		2,804		
Labour hold		Swing	▲0.1	

=== Sherbourne ===
Sherbourne (1)
Party	Candidate	Votes	%	±%
Labour	Gavin Lloyd*	1,444	41.4	+1.5
Conservative	Stephen Smith	1,423	40.8	+1.9
Green	David Priestley	253	7.3	–1.9
Liberal Democrats	Caroline Spence	150	4.3	–0.5
TUSC	Jane Nellist	115	3.3	–1.1
Coventry Citizens	Teri Fogden	100	2.9	+0.2
Majority		21	0.6	
Rejected ballots		10		
Turnout		3,495		
Labour hold		Swing	▼0.2	

=== St Michael's ===
St Michael's (1)
Party	Candidate	Votes	%	±%
Labour	Jim O'Boyle*	1,869	66.2	–3.6
Conservative	Ioannis Kalianidis	313	11.1	+1.2
TUSC	Dave Nellist	221	7.8	–1.6
Green	Chrissie Brown	176	6.2	–0.5
Liberal Democrats	Benoit Jones	135	4.8	N/A
Coventry Citizens	Karen Wilson	109	3.9	–0.3
Majority		1,556	55.1	
Rejected ballots		12		
Turnout		2,823		
Labour hold		Swing	▼2.4	

=== Upper Stoke ===
Upper Stoke (1)
Party	Candidate	Votes	%	±%
Labour	Amirjit Kaur	1,671	59.0	+1.5
Conservative	Gurdeep Sohal	492	17.4	–2.3
Green	Laura Vesty	356	12.6	+0.5
Coventry Citizens	Gary Cooper	247	8.7	+1.0
TUSC	Terri Rosser	67	2.4	–0.6
Majority		1,179	41.6	
Rejected ballots		14		
Turnout		2,847		
Labour hold		Swing	▼1.9	

=== Wainbody ===
Wainbody (1)
Party	Candidate	Votes	%	±%
Conservative	Tim Sawdon	1,874	49.1	–4.6
Labour	Mohammed Miah	1,375	36.0	+2.5
Green	Becky Finlayson	271	7.1	+2.1
Liberal Democrats	James Morshead	213	5.6	+0.1
Coventry Citizens	Adam Hancock	86	2.3	±0.0
Majority		499	13.1	
Rejected ballots		5		
Turnout		3,824		
Conservative hold		Swing	▼3.6	

=== Westwood ===
Westwood (1)
Party	Candidate	Votes	%	±%
Conservative	Marcus Lapsa*	1,689	47.1	+7.6
Labour	Randhir Auluck	1,397	38.9	–3.4
Green	Jessica Marshall	243	6.8	–2.9
Liberal Democrats	Jamie Simpson	196	5.5	–1.0
TUSC	Jim Donnelly	64	1.8	–0.3
Majority		292	8.2	
Rejected ballots		17		
Turnout		3,605		
Conservative hold		Swing	▲5.5	

=== Whoberley ===
Whoberley (1)
Party	Candidate	Votes	%	±%
Labour	Pervez Akhtar*	1,871	54.5	–7.0
Conservative	Del Chahal	782	22.8	–0.7
Green	Anne Patterson	378	11.0	+3.2
Liberal Democrats	Anna Grainger	219	6.4	+2.0
Coventry Citizens	Nate Lewis	113	3.3	+0.5
TUSC	Zoe Parker	73	2.1	N/A
Majority		1,089	31.7	
Rejected ballots		8		
Turnout		3,436		
Labour hold		Swing	▼3.2	

=== Woodlands ===
Woodlands (1)
Party	Candidate	Votes	%	±%
Conservative	Peter Male*	2,093	52.4	+1.4
Labour Co-op	Neil Rider	1,325	33.1	–1.4
Liberal Democrats	Mark Perryman	269	6.7	–0.2
Green	Lesley Sim	228	5.7	+1.2
TUSC	Sarah Davis	83	2.1	+0.7
Majority		768	19.3	
Rejected ballots		17		
Turnout		3,998		
Conservative hold		Swing	▲1.4	

=== Wyken ===
Wyken (1)
Party	Candidate	Votes	%	±%
Labour	Robert Thay*	1,549	50.0	+1.6
Conservative	William Single	924	29.8	–4.5
Green	Russell Berry	327	10.5	–0.3
Coventry Citizens	Lorna Williams	176	5.7	–0.8
Reform UK	Iddrisu Sufyan	93	3.0	N/A
TUSC	Samiul Islam	32	1.0	N/A
Majority		625	20.2	
Rejected ballots		10		
Turnout		3,111		
Labour hold		Swing	▲3.1	

== By-elections ==
=== Earlsdon ===
Earlsdon: 26 October 2023
Party	Candidate	Votes	%	±%
Labour	Lynette Kelly	1,388	43.0	–9.3
Conservative	Zaid Rehman	1,017	31.5	+2.3
Liberal Democrats	Stephen Richmond	489	15.1	+7.8
Green	John Finlayson	193	6.0	–1.0
Coventry Citizens	Cameron Baxter	107	3.3	+0.4
TUSC	Adam Harmsworth	37	1.1	–0.2
Majority		371	11.5	
Turnout		3,241		
Labour hold		Swing	▼5.8	
