= 2022 Coventry City Council election =

2022 local election in Coventry

- 5 May 2022

18 out of 54 seats to Coventry City Council 28 seats needed for a majority
- Turnout: 28.48%

	First party	Second party	Third party
Leader	George Duggins	Gary Ridley	N/A
Party	Labour	Conservative	Green
Last election	39 seats, 43.6%	15 seats, 33.4%	0 seats, 8.6%
Seats before	39	15	0
Seats won	13	4	1
Seats after	39	14	1
Seat change	Steady	▼1	▲1
Popular vote	31,794	20,104	6,630
Percentage	47.9%	30.3%	10.0%
Swing	▲4.3%	▼3.1%	▲1.4%
- Winner of each seat at the 2022 Coventry City Council election
Council control before election
Labour
Council control after election
Labour

The 2022 Coventry City Council election took place on 5 May 2022. One third of councillors — 18 out of 54 — on Coventry City Council were elected. The election took place alongside other local elections across the United Kingdom.

In the previous council election in 2021, Labour maintained its control of the council, holding 39 seats after the election. The Conservative Party held the remaining 15 seats.

== Background ==
=== History ===
Result of the council election in 2018

Result of the council election in 2021

The Local Government Act 1972 created a two-tier system of metropolitan counties and districts covering Greater Manchester, Merseyside, South Yorkshire, Tyne and Wear, the West Midlands, and West Yorkshire starting in 1974. Coventry was a district of the West Midlands metropolitan county. The Local Government Act 1985 abolished the metropolitan counties, with metropolitan districts taking on most of their powers as metropolitan boroughs. The West Midlands Combined Authority was created in 2016 and began electing the mayor of the West Midlands from 2017, which was given strategic powers covering a region coterminous with the former West Midlands metropolitan county.

Coventry Council has variously been under Labour control, Conservative control and no overall control since it was established. Labour most recently gained control of the council in the 2010 election, when they gained six seats at the expense of the Conservatives and Socialist Alternative. Labour continued to make gains to consolidate its majority on the council in the 2011 and 2012 elections, since when the party's position has remained stable. In the 2021 Coventry City Council election, Labour won 13 of the seats up for election with 43.6% of the vote, while the Conservatives won the remaining six with 33.4% of the vote. The Green Party received 8.6% of the vote but won no seats. Labour maintained its majority on the council.

Positions up for election in 2022 were last elected in 2018. In that election, Labour won thirteen seats and the Conservatives won five seats.

=== Electoral process ===
The council elects its councillors in thirds, with a third being up for election every year for three years, with no election in the fourth year. The election took place using first-past-the-post voting. Each ward was represented by three councillors, with one councillor elected in each ward in each election year to serve a four-year term.

== Previous council composition ==
After 2021 election		Before 2022 election	
Party	Seats	Party	Seats
Labour	39	Labour	39
Conservative	15	Conservative	15

== Results summary ==
2022 Coventry City Council election
Party	This election			Full council			This election		
Party	Seats	Net	Seats %	Other	Total	Total %	Votes	Votes %	+/−
Labour	13	Steady	72.2	26	39	72.2	31,794	47.9	
Conservative	4	▼1	22.2	10	14	25.9	20,104	30.3	
Green	1	▲1	5.6	0	1	1.9	6,630	10.0	
Coventry Citizens	0	Steady	0.0	0	0	0.0	2,837	4.3	
Liberal Democrats	0	Steady	0.0	0	0	0.0	2,130	3.2	
Independent	0	Steady	0.0	0	0	0.0	1,746	2.6	
TUSC	0	Steady	0.0	0	0	0.0	1,086	1.6	
ADF	0	Steady	0.0	0	0	0.0	113	0.2	N/A

== Ward results ==
=== Bablake ===
Bablake
Party	Candidate	Votes	%	±%
Conservative	Jaswant Singh Birdi	2,074	50.0	+14.7
Labour	George Robert Walker	1,391	33.5	+5.5
Green	Niall Webb	290	7.0	+1.1
Liberal Democrats	Caroline Spence	200	4.8	+3.2
Coventry Citizens	Tony Middleton	195	4.7	+1.9
Turnout		4,150		
Rejected ballots		10		
Conservative hold		Swing	▲4.6	

Bablake Seats Before the 2022 Election
Party	Councillor	
Conservative	Jaswant Singh Birdi	Outgoing
Conservative	Tarlochan Singh Jandu	2019-Incumbent
Conservative	Steven Keough	2021-Incumbent

=== Binley and Willenhall ===
Binley and Willenhall
Party	Candidate	Votes	%	±%
Labour	John Roderick Mutton	1,355	41.3	+3.9
Conservative	Amarjit Singh Khangura	949	28.9	−1.6
Coventry Citizens	Paul Nichalos Cowley	635	19.3	−2.1
Green	Chrissie Lynn Brown	232	7.1	+1.5
ADF	Marianne Angela Fitzgerald	113	3.4	N/A
Turnout		3,284		
Rejected ballots		21		
Labour hold		Swing	▲2.8	

Binley and Willenhall Seats Before the 2022 Election
Party	Councillor	
Labour	John Mutton	Outgoing
Labour	Ram Parkash Lakha	2019-Incumbent
Labour	Christine Elizabeth Thomas	2021-Incumbent

=== Cheylesmore ===
Cheylesmore
Party	Candidate	Votes	%	±%
Conservative	Roger Maurice James Bailey	1,848	47.0	±0.0
Labour	Ami Kaur	1,526	38.8	+3.1
Green	John Verdult	222	5.6	−2.3
Liberal Democrats	Anna Caroline Grainger	193	4.9	−0.1
Coventry Citizens	Sian Katie Jones	82	2.1	−0.8
TUSC	Judy Griffiths	61	1.6	±0.0
Turnout		3,932		
Rejected ballots		13		
Conservative hold		Swing	▼1.6	

Cheylesmore Seats Before the 2022 Election
Party	Councillor	
Conservative	Roger Bailey	Outgoing
Labour	Richard Brown	2019-Incumbent
Conservative	Barbara Mosterman	2021-Incumbent

=== Earlsdon ===
Earlsdon
Party	Candidate	Votes	%	±%
Labour Co-op	Kindy Sandhu	2,806	53.0	+9.4
Conservative	Zaid Rehman	1,537	29.0	−6.5
Liberal Democrats	Stephen John Richmond	469	8.9	−0.9
Green	John David Campbell Finlayson	250	4.7	−1.4
Coventry Citizens	Cameron Ewart Baxter	181	3.4	−0.8
TUSC	Adam Joachim Harmsworth	48	0.9	±0.0
Turnout		5,291		
Rejected ballots		29		
Labour hold		Swing	▲8.0	

Earlsdon Seats Before the 2022 Election
Party	Councillor	
Labour	Kindy Sandhu	Outgoing
Labour	Becky Gittins	2019-Incumbent
Labour	Antony Tucker	2021-Incumbent

=== Foleshill ===
Foleshill
Party	Candidate	Votes	%	±%
Labour	Tariq Khan	1,806	46.0	+0.4
Independent	Zia Ahmed Khan	1,746	44.5	+9.8
Conservative	Raja Reddy Meesala	373	9.5	−0.4
Turnout		3,925		
Rejected ballots		27		
Labour hold		Swing	▼4.7	

Foleshill Seats Before the 2022 Election
Party	Councillor	
Labour	Tariq Khan	Outgoing
Labour	Abdul Salam Khan	2019-Incumbent
Labour	Shakila Nazir	2021-Incumbent

=== Henley ===
Henley
Party	Candidate	Votes	%	±%
Labour	Kevin Barry Maton	1,865	54.8	−1.3
Conservative	Kenneth John Taylor	960	28.2	−0.8
Green	Cathy Wattebot	296	8.7	+3.2
Coventry Citizens	Charlie Ann Wilson	219	6.4	+2.3
TUSC	Aidan Spencer O'Toole	63	1.9	+0.5
Turnout		3,403		
Rejected ballots		15		
Labour hold		Swing	▼0.3	

Henley Seats Before the 2022 Election
Party	Councillor	
Labour	Kevin Maton	Outgoing
Labour	Patricia Seaman	2019-Incumbent
Labour	Ed Ruane	2021-Incumbent

=== Holbrook ===
Holbrook
Party	Candidate	Votes	%	±%
Green	Stephen Robert George Gray	2,105	51.3	+16.3
Labour	Raj Dhaliwal	1,611	39.3	−3.7
Conservative	Zeeshan Qazi	290	7.1	−9.4
Coventry Citizens	Alan Benjamin Gavin	64	1.6	−2.5
TUSC	Jim Hensman	31	0.8	N/A
Turnout		4,101		
Rejected ballots		22		
Green gain from Labour		Swing	▲10.0	

=== Longford ===
Longford
Party	Candidate	Votes	%	±%
Labour	Lindsley Harvard	1,982	60.9	+3.9
Conservative	Diane Sylvia Crookes	645	19.8	−2.2
Green	Karl Aldred	295	9.1	+4.3
Liberal Democrats	Jaspal Singh Bahara	181	5.6	+1.7
Coventry Citizens	Nicola Jayne Spalding	151	4.6	+1.0
Turnout		3,254		
Rejected ballots		17		
Labour hold		Swing	▲3.1	

=== Lower Stoke ===
Lower Stoke
Party	Candidate	Votes	%	±%
Labour Co-op	Rupinder Singh	2,274	59.5	+6.5
Conservative	Michael Arthur Ballinger	810	21.2	−6.8
Green	Esther Mary Reeves	400	10.5	+1.5
Coventry Citizens	Danielle Stringfellow	211	5.5	+1.5
TUSC	John Patrick O'Sullivan	130	3.4	+1.1
Turnout		3,825		
Rejected ballots		15		
Labour hold		Swing	▲6.7	

=== Radford ===
Radford
Party	Candidate	Votes	%	±%
Labour	Patricia Maria Hetherton	1,807	61.1	+7.0
Conservative	Laura Frances Ridley	600	20.3	−4.2
Green	Julie Ann Spriddle	261	8.8	±0.0
Coventry Citizens	Irena Bosworth	175	5.9	+0.4
TUSC	Dave Anderson	114	3.9	+0.3
Turnout		2,957		
Rejected ballots		13		
Labour hold		Swing		

=== Sherbourne ===
Sherbourne
Party	Candidate	Votes	%	±%
Labour	Seamus Walsh	1,455	39.9	+0.1
Conservative	Jackie Gardiner	1,420	38.9	−3.3
Green	George Teggin	336	9.2	+0.6
Liberal Democrats	Nukey Proctor	176	4.8	+0.3
TUSC	Jane Elizabeth Nellist	159	4.4	+2.9
Coventry Citizens	Marcus Luke Paris Fogden	100	2.7	−0.7
Turnout		3,646		
Rejected ballots		13		
Labour hold		Swing	▲1.7	

=== St Michael's ===
St Michael's
Party	Candidate	Votes	%	±%
Labour	David Stuart Welsh	1,898	69.8	+3.2
Conservative	Mary Taylor	270	9.9	−2.7
TUSC	Dave Nellist	257	9.4	+0.4
Green	David Neil Priestley	181	6.7	+1.3
Coventry Citizens	Karen Wilson	114	4.2	+0.9
Turnout		2,720		
Rejected ballots		13		
Labour hold		Swing	▲3.0	

=== Upper Stoke ===
Upper Stoke
Party	Candidate	Votes	%	±%
Labour	Gurdev Singh Hayre	1,696	57.5	+3.6
Conservative	Gurdeep Singh Sohal	582	19.7	−6.3
Green	Laura Katherine Vesty	357	12.1	+3.8
Coventry Citizens	Gary Ronald Cooper	226	7.7	+2.8
TUSC	Terri-Jay Hersey	87	3.0	+1.2
Turnout		2,948		
Rejected ballots		14		
Labour hold		Swing	▲5.0	

=== Wainbody ===
Wainbody
Party	Candidate	Votes	%	±%
Conservative	Mattie Heaven	2,105	53.7	−1.9
Labour	Arthur Des	1,315	33.5	+3.2
Liberal Democrats	James Frederick Morshead	214	5.5	+0.6
Green	Becky Finlayson	198	5.0	−2.1
Coventry Citizens	Adam Jack Hancock	89	2.3	+0.2
Turnout		3,921		
Rejected ballots		7		
Conservative hold		Swing	▼2.6	

=== Westwood ===
Westwood
Party	Candidate	Votes	%	±%
Labour	Abdul Jobbar	1,533	42.3	+8.7
Conservative	Manjeet Rai	1,431	39.5	−4.7
Green	Jessica Mary Marshall	350	9.7	−1.3
Liberal Democrats	Jamie Simpson	235	6.5	+1.9
TUSC	Jim Donnelly	76	2.1	−0.4
Turnout		3,625		
Rejected ballots		17		
Labour gain from Conservative		Swing	▲6.7	

=== Whoberley ===
Whoberley
Party	Candidate	Votes	%	±%
Labour Co-op	Bally Singh	2,390	61.5	+14.0
Conservative	Stephen James Smith	911	23.5	−8.6
Green	Anne Patterson	303	7.8	−4.5
Liberal Democrats	Russell David Field	172	4.4	−0.4
Coventry Citizens	Nate Lewis	108	2.8	−0.6
Turnout		3,884		
Rejected ballots		15		
Labour Co-op hold		Swing	▲11.3	

=== Woodlands ===
Woodlands
Party	Candidate	Votes	%	±%
Conservative	Julia Lepoidevin	2,142	51.0	−6.8
Labour Co-op	Lynnette Catherine Kelly	1,449	34.5	+4.2
Liberal Democrats	Mark James Perryman	290	6.9	+1.6
Green	Lesley Clare Sim	191	4.5	+1.3
Coventry Citizens	Thomas Watts	67	1.6	−0.7
TUSC	Sarah Stephanie Davis	60	1.4	+0.2
Turnout		4,199		
Rejected ballots		19		
Conservative hold		Swing	▼5.5	

=== Wyken ===
Wyken
Party	Candidate	Votes	%	±%
Labour	Faye Abbott	1,635	48.4	+7.4
Conservative	Myooran Sri	1,157	34.3	−1.2
Green	Russell Berry	363	10.8	+1.3
Coventry Citizens	Lorna Kareen Williams	220	6.5	+1.2
Turnout		3,375		
Rejected ballots		19		
Labour hold		Swing	▲4.3	

== Changes between 2022 and 2023 ==
=== By-elections ===
==== Binley and Willenhall ====
Binley and Willenhall by-election, 14 July 2022
Party	Candidate	Votes	%	±%
Labour	Seyi Agboola	934	36.2	−5.1
Conservative	Amarjit Singh Khangura	765	29.6	+0.7
Coventry Citizens	Paul Cowley	746	28.9	+9.6
ADF	Marianne Angela Fitzgerald	91	3.5	+0.1
TUSC	Michael James Morgan	46	1.8	N/A
Majority		169	6.5	−5.9
Turnout		2,582	20.0	
Rejected ballots		20		
Labour hold		Swing		

The by-election followed the death of Labour councillor John Mutton on 14 May 2022.

==== Sherbourne ====
Sherbourne by-election, 22 September 2022
Party	Candidate	Votes	%	±%
Conservative	Jackie Gardiner	1,409	51.2	+12.3
Labour	Des Arthur	895	32.5	−7.4
Green	Bruce Raymond Tetlow	139	5.0	−4.2
TUSC	Jane Elizabeth Nellist	125	4.5	+0.1
Liberal Democrats	Jamie Simpson	94	3.4	−1.4
Coventry Citizens	Cameron Ewart Baxter	92	3.3	+0.6
Majority		514	18.7	+17.7
Turnout		2,754		
Rejected ballots		2		
Conservative gain from Labour		Swing	9.9	

The by-election followed the death of Labour councillor Seamus Walsh on 17 July 2022.
