= 2024 Coventry City Council election =

2024 local election in Coventry

- 2 May 2024 and 20 June 2024

18 out of 54 seats to Coventry City Council 28 seats needed for a majority

	First party	Second party	Third party
Leader	George Duggins	Gary Ridley	Stephen Gray
Party	Labour	Conservative	Green
Last election	37 seats, 50.4%	15 seats, 29.5%	2 seat, 9.3%
Seats before	37	15	2
Seats won	17	3	0
Seats after	40	12	2
Seat change	▲3	▼3	Steady
- Winner of each seat at the 2024 Coventry City Council election
Leader before election
George Duggins
Labour
Leader after election
TBD
Labour

The 2024 Coventry City Council election was held predominately on 2 May 2024 alongside the other local elections across the United Kingdom being held on the same day, with one ward's election additionally being held a month later on 20 June 2024. The results mirrored Labour's strong showing across the country, taking three seats from the Conservatives and increasing their comfortable majority on the council.

Originally the Labour-held seat in Radford ward was meant to be contested on the same day as the other wards, but was delayed to 20 June 2024 due to the death of the ward's Trade Unionist and Socialist Coalition candidate a week before the election. The incumbent Labour councillor Mal Mutton unofficially remained in the seat between 4 May and 20 June 2024 before being re-elected. This was counted by the council as part of the local election rather than as a by-election.

== Background ==
Results of the 2021 council election, when these seats were last up for election

Results of the most recent council election in 2023

The Local Government Act 1972 created a two-tier system of metropolitan counties and districts covering Greater Manchester, Merseyside, South Yorkshire, Tyne and Wear, the West Midlands, and West Yorkshire starting in 1974. Coventry was a district of the West Midlands metropolitan county. The Local Government Act 1985 abolished the metropolitan counties, with metropolitan districts taking on most of their powers as metropolitan boroughs. The West Midlands Combined Authority was created in 2016 and began electing the mayor of the West Midlands from 2017, which was given strategic powers covering a region coterminous with the former West Midlands metropolitan county.

Coventry Council has variously been under Labour control, Conservative control and no overall control since it was established. Labour most recently gained control of the council in the 2010 election, when they gained six seats at the expense of the Conservatives and Socialist Alternative. Labour continued to make gains to consolidate its majority on the council in the 2011 and 2012 elections, since when the party's position has remained stable. In the most recent election in 2023, Labour won 13 of the seats up for election with 50.4% of the vote, the Conservatives won four seats with 29.5% of the vote, and the Greens won one seat with 9.3% of the vote. Labour maintained its majority on the council.

Seats up for election in 2023 were last elected in 2021. This election was originally scheduled for 2020, but was delayed by a year due to the COVID-19 pandemic. In that election, Labour won thirteen seats and the Conservatives won six seats.

== Electoral process ==
The council elects its councillors in thirds, with a third being up for election every year for three years, with no election in the fourth year. The election took place by first-past-the-post voting, with wards being represented by three councillors, with one councillor elected in each ward each election year to serve a four-year term.

All registered electors (British, Irish, Commonwealth and European Union citizens) living in Coventry aged 18 or over were entitled to vote in the election. People who live at two addresses in different councils, such as university students with different term-time and holiday addresses, were entitled to be registered for and vote in elections in both local authorities. Voting in-person at polling stations took place from 07:00 to 22:00 on election day, and voters were able to apply for postal votes or proxy votes in advance of the election. People voting in this election in Coventry had only vote for a councillor in the ward they reside.

== Previous council composition ==
Coventry City Council's composition following the 2024 election.

After 2023 election		Before 2024 election		After 2024 election	
Party	Seats	Party	Seats	Party	Seats
Labour	37	Labour	37	Labour	40
Conservative	15	Conservative	15	Conservative	12
Green	2	Green	2	Green	2

Changes:

- 8 September 2023: Becky Gittins (Labour) resigns to stand as the Labour candidate for Clwyd East at the 2024 general election. A by-election is scheduled for 26 October 2023.
- 26 October 2023: The Earlsdon by-election is won by Lynette Kelly; Labour holds the seat.

== Summary ==
=== Election result ===
2024 Coventry City Council election
Party	This election				Full council			This election		
Party	Candidates	Seats	Net	Seats %	Other	Total	Total %	Votes	Votes %	+/−
Labour	{{{candidates}}}	15	▲3	83.3	25	40	74.1	34,321	49.8	-0.6
Conservative	{{{candidates}}}	3	▼3	16.7	9	12	22.2	18,503	26.9	-2.7
Green	{{{candidates}}}	0	Steady	0.0	2	2	3.7	5,206	7.6	-1.7
Coventry Citizens	{{{candidates}}}	0	Steady	0.0	0	0	0.0	3,954	5.7	+0.9
Liberal Democrats	{{{candidates}}}	0	Steady	0.0	0	0	0.0	2,995	4.3	+1.0
Independent	{{{candidates}}}	0	Steady	0.0	0	0	0.0	1,838	2.7	NA
TUSC	{{{candidates}}}	0	Steady	0.0	0	0	0.0	1,646	2.4	+0.2
Britain First	{{{candidates}}}	0	Steady	0.0	0	0	0.0	379	0.6	N/A
Women's Equality	{{{candidates}}}	0	Steady	0.0	0	0	0.0	60	0.1	N/A

== Ward results ==
=== Bablake ===
Bablake
Party	Candidate	Votes	%	±%
Labour	Bea Christopher	1,612	38.3	+1.9
Conservative	Steve Keough*	1,528	36.3	–9.9
Britain First	Amanda Peel	379	9.0	N/A
Green	Niall Webb	292	6.9	–0.5
Coventry Citizens	Tony Middleton	194	4.6	–0.1
Liberal Democrats	Russell Field	157	3.7	–1.2
TUSC	Anthony Downes	43	1.0	+0.5
Majority		84	2.0	N/A
Turnout		4,224		
Labour gain from Conservative		Swing	▲5.9	

=== Binley and Willenhall ===
Binley and Willenhall
Party	Candidate	Votes	%	±%
Labour	Christine Thomas*	1,478	41.8	–3.5
Coventry Citizens	Paul Cowley	1,421	40.2	+8.4
Conservative	William Single	562	15.9	–1.8
TUSC	Rob Slater	77	2.2	+0.7
Majority		57	1.6	–11.9
Turnout		3,568		
Labour hold		Swing	▼6.0	

=== Cheylesmore ===
Cheylesmore
Party	Candidate	Votes	%	±%
Conservative	Barbara Mosterman*	1,726	43.0	+3.6
Labour	Randhir Auluck	1,601	39.9	–4.4
Green	Bruce Tetlow	282	7.0	±0.0
Coventry Citizens	Josh Finch	178	4.4	+1.1
Liberal Democrats	Rambir Khatkar	150	3.7	–0.9
TUSC	Judy Griffiths	73	1.8	+0.4
Majority		125	3.1	N/A
Turnout		4,062		
Conservative hold		Swing	▲4.0	

=== Earlsdon ===
Earlsdon
Party	Candidate	Votes	%	±%
Labour Co-op	Antony Tucker*	2,688	52.7	+0.4
Conservative	Zaid Rehman	1,663	32.6	+3.4
Liberal Democrats	Stephen Richmond	612	12.0	+4.7
TUSC	Adam Harmsworth	139	2.7	+1.4
Majority		1,025	20.1	–3.0
Turnout		5,148		
Labour Co-op hold		Swing	▼1.5	

=== Foleshill ===
Foleshill
Party	Candidate	Votes	%	±%
Labour	Shakila Nazir	2,027	46.9	–31.6
Independent	Ferhan Kiani	1,391	32.2	N/A
Conservative	Rakesh Gill	356	8.2	–6.3
Independent	Abdirazak Ahmed	247	5.7	N/A
Coventry Citizens	Teri Fogden	180	4.2	N/A
Liberal Democrats	David-Leigh Waters	125	2.9	N/A
Majority		636	14.7	–49.3
Turnout		4,408		
Labour hold				

=== Henley ===
Henley
Party	Candidate	Votes	%	±%
Labour	Ed Ruane*	2,234	58.5	–4.1
Conservative	Michael Ballinger	863	22.6	+2.1
Green	Cathy Wattebot	247	6.5	–2.2
Coventry Citizens	Tom Watts	229	6.0	–0.7
Liberal Democrats	Timothy Macy	190	5.0	N/A
TUSC	Aidan O'Toole	55	1.4	–0.2
Majority		1,371	35.9	–6.2
Turnout		3,818		
Labour hold		Swing	▼3.1	

=== Holbrook ===
Holbrook
Party	Candidate	Votes	%	±%
Labour Co-op	Rachel Lancaster*	2,180	55.2	+12.8
Green	Gareth Lloyd	1,234	31.2	–13.4
Conservative	Zeeshan Qazi	427	10.8	–0.5
TUSC	Jim Hensman	111	2.8	+1.1
Majority		946	24.0	N/A
Turnout		3,952		
Labour Co-op hold		Swing	▲13.1	

=== Longford ===
Longford
Party	Candidate	Votes	%	±%
Labour	George Duggins*	2,289	65.9	–1.7
Conservative	William Sidhu	507	14.6	–3.1
Green	Rachel Ward	284	8.2	+0.5
Coventry Citizens	Denise Sànchez	178	5.1	±0.0
Liberal Democrats	Ryan McMichael	122	3.5	N/A
TUSC	Alan Checklin	93	2.7	+0.8
Majority		1,782	51.3	+1.4
Turnout		3,473		
Labour hold		Swing	▲0.7	

=== Lower Stoke ===
Lower Stoke
Party	Candidate	Votes	%	±%
Labour	Catherine Miks*	2,677	61.5	+5.9
Conservative	Paul Wyatt	812	18.7	–4.4
Green	Tom Jewell	357	8.2	–0.5
Coventry Citizens	Dani Stringfellow	205	4.7	–0.2
Liberal Democrats	Andre Soares	176	4.0	–1.2
TUSC	John O'Sullivan	124	2.8	+0.4
Majority		1,865	42.8	
Turnout		4,351		
Labour hold		Swing	▲5.2	

=== Radford ===
Radford, 20 June 2024 (Note: As part of the locals the Labour-held seat in Radford ward was originally meant to be contested on the same day as the other wards, but was delayed to 20 June 2024 due to the death of the ward's Trade Unionist and Socialist Coalition candidate a week before the election. The incumbent Labour councillor Mal Mutton unofficially remained in the seat between 4 May and 20 June 2024. The revised statement of persons nominated was released 24 May 2024)
Party	Candidate	Votes	%	±%
Labour	Mal Mutton*	1,082	58.0	−2.1
Conservative	Stephen Smith	328	17.6	−1.5
Green	Julie Spriddle	156	8.4	−1.1
Coventry Citizens	Cameron Baxter	128	6.9	N/A
Liberal Democrats	Caroline Spence	98	5.3	N/A
TUSC	Mila Matharu	72	3.9	−0.3
Majority		754	40.5	−0.5
Rejected ballots		10		
Turnout		1,864		
Labour hold		Swing	▼0.3	

=== Sherbourne ===
Sherbourne
Party	Candidate	Votes	%	±%
Labour	Dave Toulson	1,636	42.8	+1.4
Conservative	Ryan Simpson*	1,490	39.0	−1.8
Green	David Priestley	261	6.8	−0.5
Coventry Citizens	Julian Montague	161	4.2	+1.3
TUSC	Jane Nellist	136	3.6	+0.3
Liberal Democrats	Rachel Norwood	136	3.6	−0.7
Majority		146	3.8	
Turnout		3,820		
Labour gain from Conservative		Swing		

=== St. Michael's ===
St. Michael's
Party	Candidate	Votes	%	±%
Labour	Naeem Akhtar*	2,222	62.1	–4.1
Conservative	Mehmet Yetkin	350	9.8	–1.3
TUSC	Dave Nellist	346	9.7	+1.9
Green	Chrissie Brown	329	9.2	+3.0
Coventry Citizens	Karen Wilson	186	5.2	+1.3
Liberal Democrats	Benoit Jones	147	4.1	–0.7
Majority		1,872	52.3	–2.8
Turnout		3,580		
Labour hold		Swing	▼1.4	

=== Upper Stoke ===
Upper Stoke
Party	Candidate	Votes	%	±%
Labour	Kamran Caan*	2,049	57.9	–1.1
Conservative	Pratibha Ramidi	508	14.4	–3.0
Green	John Finlayson	287	8.1	–4.5
Coventry Citizens	Marcus Fogden	218	6.2	–2.5
Liberal Democrats	James Gallagher	186	5.3	N/A
Independent	Aaron Essel	143	4.0	N/A
TUSC	Terri Rosser	88	2.5	+0.1
Independent	Angela Rusu	57	1.6	N/A
Majority		1,541	43.5	+1.9
Turnout		3,536		
Labour hold		Swing	▲1.0	

=== Wainbody ===
Wainbody
Party	Candidate	Votes	%	±%
Conservative	John Blundell*	1,869	49.8	+0.7
Labour	Dianabasi Nkantah	1,295	34.5	–1.5
Green	Becky Finlayson	258	6.9	–0.2
Liberal Democrats	James Morshead	169	4.5	–1.1
Coventry Citizens	Adam Hancock	104	2.8	+0.5
Women's Equality	Megan Lemee	60	1.6	N/A
Majority		574	15.3	+2.2
Turnout		3,774		
Conservative hold		Swing	▲1.1	

=== Westwood ===
Westwood
Party	Candidate	Votes	%	±%
Labour	Grace Lewis	1,936	47.3	+8.4
Conservative	Asha Masih	1,415	34.5	–12.6
Green	Jess Marshall	342	8.3	+1.5
Liberal Democrats	Jamie Simpson	199	4.9	–0.6
Coventry Citizens	Nate Lewis	139	3.4	N/A
TUSC	Jim Donnelly	65	1.6	–0.2
Majority		521	12.8	N/A
Turnout		4,143		
Labour gain from Conservative		Swing	▲10.5	

=== Whoberley ===
Whoberley
Party	Candidate	Votes	%	±%
Labour	Jayne Innes	2,070	55.6	+1.1
Conservative	Lisa Boyle	821	22.0	–0.8
Green	Anne Patterson	429	11.5	+0.5
Liberal Democrats	Anna Grainger	199	5.3	–1.1
Coventry Citizens	Ian Stringfellow	132	3.5	+0.2
TUSC	Zoe Parker	74	2.0	–0.1
Majority		1,249	33.6	+1.9
Turnout		3,762		
Labour hold		Swing	▲1.0	

=== Woodlands ===
Woodlands
Party	Candidate	Votes	%	±%
Conservative	Gary Ridley*	1,994	47.5	–4.9
Labour Co-op	Neil Rider	1,563	37.2	+4.1
Green	Lesley Sim	216	5.1	–0.6
Liberal Democrats	Mark Perryman	213	5.1	–1.6
Coventry Citizens	Lorna Williams	121	2.9	N/A
TUSC	Sarah Davis	90	2.1	±0.0
Majority		431	10.3	–9.0
Turnout		4,232		
Conservative hold		Swing	▼4.5	

=== Wyken ===
Wyken
Party	Candidate	Votes	%	±%
Labour	Angela Hopkins*	1,682	47.3	–2.7
Conservative	Frank Beechey	1,284	36.1	+6.3
Green	Richard Baker	232	6.5	–4.0
Coventry Citizens	Gary Cooper	180	5.1	–0.6
Liberal Democrats	Annabell Gurney-Terry	116	3.3	N/A
TUSC	Mila Matharu	60	1.7	+0.7
Majority		398	11.2	–9.0
Turnout		3,593		
Labour hold		Swing	▼4.5	

== Changes 2024-2026 ==
=== By-elections ===
==== St Michael's ====
St Michael's: 10 October 2024
Party	Candidate	Votes	%	±%
Labour	Sanjida Jobbar	899	49.1	–13.0
TUSC	Dave Nellist	327	17.9	+8.2
Workers Party	Ejaz Akbar Janjua	212	11.6	N/A
Conservative	Mehmet Yetkin	145	7.9	–1.9
Green	Thomas James Jewell	96	5.2	–4.0
Coventry Citizens	Karen Wilson	94	5.1	–0.1
Liberal Democrats	Robyn Clare Simpson	57	3.1	–1.0
Majority		572	31.2	–21.1
Turnout		1,836		
Labour hold		Swing	▼10.6	
