= 2026 Coventry City Council election =

Local election in West Midlands, England

- 7 May 2026

All 54 seats to Coventry City Council 28 seats needed for a majority
	First party	Second party	Third party
Leader	George Duggins	Jackie Gardiner	Gary Ridley defeated
Party	Labour	Reform	Conservative
Last election	40 seats, 49.8%	Did not stand	12 seats, 26.9%
Seats before	39	2	10
Seats won	24	20	6
Seat change	▼15	▲18	▼4
Popular vote	77,434	77,728	43,663
Percentage	29.3%	29.4%	16.5%
Swing	▼20.5%	N/A	▼10.4%
	Fourth party	Fifth party
Leader	Esther Reeves
Party	Green	Independent
Last election	2 seats, 7.6%	0 seats, 2.7%
Seats before	2	1
Seats won	4	0
Seat change	▲2	▼1
Popular vote	52,747	1,430
Percentage	20.0%	0.5%
Swing	▲12.4%	▼2.2%
- Map showing the winner of each seat at the 2026 Coventry City Council election.
Leader before election
George Duggins
Labour
Leader after election
George Duggins
Labour
No overall control (Note: Labour minority.)

The 2026 Coventry City Council election was held on 7 May 2026 alongside the other local elections across the United Kingdom held on the same day.

Prior to the election, the council was under Labour majority control. At the election, the council went under no overall control. Labour made a net loss of 15 seats compared to the position immediately before the election. They remained the largest party, but were left four seats short of a majority. Reform UK, which had only held two seats prior to the election, won 20 seats and became the second largest party on the council. Labour managed to form a minority administration after the election. Their incumbent leader of the council, George Duggins, was reappointed to the role at the subsequent annual council meeting on 21 May 2026.

== Background ==
In 2024, Labour retained control of the council. Typically, one third of Coventry's council is elected each election, with elections happening every three out of four years, however in this election all 54 seats on Coventry City Council were elected due to ward boundary changes. In each ward, three candidates were elected; the first-placed candidate was elected for a four year term, the second-placed candidate was elected for a two year term, and the third-placed candidate was elected for a one year term.

== Council composition ==
After 2024 election		Before 2026 election (Note: Last updated 10 February 2026.)	
Party	Seats	Party	Seats
Labour	40	Labour	39
Conservative	12	Conservative	10
Green	2	Green	2 (Note: Councillors Gray, Lewis, and Reeves sat as part of the Green and Independent Alliance Group.)
Reform	0	Reform	2
Independent	0	Independent	1

Changes 2024–2026:

- August 2024: David Welsh (Labour) resigns – by-election held October 2024 and won by Sanjida Jobbar (Labour).
- June 2025: Jackie Gardiner (Conservative) and Marcus Lapsa (Conservative) join Reform.
- August 2025: Grace Lewis (Labour) leaves party to sit as an independent.

== Election result ==
2026 Coventry City Council election
Party	Candidates	Seats	Gains	Losses	Net gain/loss	Seats %	Votes %	Votes	+/−
Labour	54	24	0	16	▼15	44.4	29.3	77,434 (Note: Including votes for Labour Co–op candidates)	–20.5
Reform	54	20	20	0	▲18	37.0	29.4	77,728	N/A
Conservative	54	6	0	6	▼4	11.1	16.5	43,663	–10.4
Green	54	4	2	0	▲2	7.4	20.0	52,747	+12.4
Liberal Democrats	20	0	0	0	Steady	0.0	2.3	5,944	–2.0
TUSC	21	0	0	0	Steady	0.0	0.9	2,386	–1.5
Workers Party	3	0	0	0	Steady	0.0	0.6	1,534	N/A
Independent	3	0	0	0	▼1	0.0	0.5	1,430	N/A
Coventry Citizens	4	0	0	0	Steady	0.0	0.3	997	–5.4
SDP	3	0	0	0	Steady	0.0	0.1	229	N/A
Turnout		93,391	38.3						
Rejected ballots		301							
Total valid votes		93,090							
Total ballots		264,092							
Registered electors		243,553							

== Ward results ==
=== Bablake ===
Bablake (3 seats)
Party	Candidate	Votes	%	±%
Reform	Lisa Boyle	1,987	38.6	N/A
Reform	Jamie Fearn	1,820	35.4	N/A
Reform	Jennifer Wells	1,741	33.9	N/A
Conservative	Jaswant Burdi*	1,298	25.2	−11.1
Labour	Martin Asamoah	1,084	21.1	−17.2
Conservative	Tarlochan Jandu*	966	18.8	−17.5
Labour	Joshi Ram	944	18.4	−19.9
Labour	Dianabasi Nkantah	936	18.2	−20.1
Green	Peter Brommer	840	16.3	+9.4
Conservative	Muhammad Tariq	757	14.7	−21.6
Green	Niall Webb	713	13.9	+7.0
Green	Tramore Masterson-Lawrence	680	13.2	+6.3
Independent	Lee Stuart	357	6.9	N/A
Liberal Democrats	Russell Field	309	6.0	+2.3
Coventry Citizens	Karen Wilson	183	3.6	−1.0
Turnout		5,153	42.4	
Rejected ballots		11		
Registered electors		12,161		
Reform gain from Labour				
Reform gain from Conservative				
Reform gain from Conservative				

=== Binley & Willenhall ===
Binley & WIllenhall (3 seats)
Party	Candidate	Votes	%	±%
Reform	Paul Cowley	1,958	42.6	N/A
Reform	Marcus Fogden	1,735	37.7	N/A
Reform	Jennifer Odje	1,648	35.8	N/A
Labour	Ram Lakha*	1,389	30.2	−11.6
Labour	Seyi Agboola*	1,359	29.5	−12.3
Labour	Emma O'Neil	1,236	26.9	−14.9
Green	David Feetenby	600	13.0	N/A
Green	Sarah Ockenden	595	12.9	N/A
Green	Callum Mace	544	11.8	N/A
Conservative	Heather Pearson	440	9.6	−6.3
Conservative	Paras Jain	403	8.8	−7.1
Coventry Citizens	Cameron Baxter	355	7.7	−32.5
Conservative	Neda Rahimian	288	6.3	−9.6
Liberal Democrats	Harry Penhale	210	4.6	N/A
TUSC	Rob Slater	85	1.8	−0.4
Turnout		4,617	34.6	
Rejected ballots		17		
Registered electors		13,331		
Reform gain from Labour				
Reform gain from Labour				
Reform gain from Labour				

=== Cheylesmore ===
Cheylesmore (3 seats)
Party	Candidate	Votes	%	±%
Conservative	Roger Bailey*	2,164	38.7	−4.3
Conservative	Barbara Mosterman*	1,735	31.0	−12.0
Labour	Richard Brown*	1,446	25.9	−14.0
Conservative	Shiva Pala	1,390	24.9	−18.1
Reform	John-Paul Ahearne	1,351	24.2	N/A
Reform	John Peakman	1,304	23.3	N/A
Labour	Pouneh Ahari	1,165	20.8	−19.1
Reform	Folajimi Ashiru	1,083	19.4	N/A
Green	Barbara Collins	1,013	18.1	+11.1
Labour	Mohammed Miah	1,010	18.1	−21.8
Green	Danielle Watts	903	16.1	+9.1
Green	Sebastian Rumsby	894	16.0	+9.0
Liberal Democrats	Rachel Green	327	5.8	+2.1
TUSC	Marie Egan	118	2.1	+0.3
TUSC	Fa Madzi	93	1.7	−0.1
Turnout		5,600	42.9	
Rejected ballots		8		
Registered electors		13,060		
Conservative hold				
Conservative hold				
Labour hold				

=== Earlsdon ===
Earlsdon (3 seats)
Party	Candidate	Votes	%	±%
Labour Co-op	Kindy Sandhu*	2,373	36.2	−16.5
Labour Co-op	Lynnette Kelly*	2,232	34.1	−18.6
Labour Co-op	Antony Tucker*	2,110	32.2	−20.5
Reform	John Allbright	1,377	21.0	N/A
Green	Janet Roberts	1,346	20.6	N/A
Reform	Stuart Beamish	1,307	20.0	N/A
Green	Ed Manning	1,214	18.5	N/A
Conservative	Kenneth Taylor	1,206	18.4	−14.2
Reform	Maureen Lapsa	1,192	18.2	N/A
Green	Mike Roberts	1,147	17.5	N/A
Conservative	Katie Emery	1,111	17.0	−15.6
Conservative	Zaid Rehman	969	14.8	−17.8
Liberal Democrats	Stephen Richmond	563	8.6	−3.4
Liberal Democrats	Jamie Simpson	361	5.5	−6.5
Liberal Democrats	Robyn Simpson	338	5.2	−6.8
TUSC	Doris Militarschi	113	1.7	−1.0
SDP	Paul Crilly	81	1.2	N/A
SDP	Barnie Giltrap	76	1.2	N/A
SDP	Michael Newton	72	1.1	N/A
Turnout		6,564	52.7	
Rejected ballots		17		
Registered electors		12,462		
Labour Co-op hold				
Labour Co-op hold				
Labour Co-op hold				

=== Foleshill ===
Foleshill (3 seats)
Party	Candidate	Votes	%	±%
Labour	Abdul Khan*	1,934	44.9	−2.0
Labour	Shakila Nazir*	1,828	42.5	−4.4
Labour	Habib Rehman	1,689	39.2	−7.7
Green	Raja Meesala	901	20.9	N/A
Green	Zeeshan Qazi	862	20.0	N/A
Green	Sujatha Misala	839	19.5	N/A
Workers Party	Mohammed Dad	665	15.4	N/A
Workers Party	Paul Bedson	504	11.7	N/A
Reform	Duncan Holden	482	11.2	N/A
Reform	Onkar Singh	471	10.9	N/A
Reform	Josh Richardson	448	10.4	N/A
Workers Party	John Karabinas	365	8.5	N/A
Conservative	Ashwin Rathod	290	6.7	−1.5
Conservative	Lavinder Shargill	288	6.7	−1.5
Conservative	Chris Winters	245	5.7	−2.5
Liberal Democrats	Anna Richmond	168	3.9	+1.0
TUSC	Mila Matharu	81	1.9	N/A
Turnout		4,336	30.9	
Rejected ballots		31		
Registered electors		14,010		
Labour hold				
Labour hold				
Labour hold				

=== Henley ===
Henley (3 seats)
Party	Candidate	Votes	%	±%
Reform	Mel Gregory	1,755	35.7	N/A
Reform	Alistair Cole	1,722	35.0	N/A
Labour	Ed Ruane*	1,573	32.0	−26.5
Labour	Patricia Seaman*	1,502	30.5	−28.0
Reform	Harjinder Sehmi	1,491	30.3	N/A
Labour	Neil Rider	1,488	30.3	−28.2
Conservative	Deepesh Scariya	761	15.5	−7.1
Green	Rachael Douglas	690	14.0	+7.5
Conservative	Tim Sawdon	683	13.9	−8.7
Conservative	Josmi Varghese	671	13.6	−9.0
Green	Oscar Kemble	640	13.0	+6.5
Green	Raja Khan	547	11.1	+4.6
Liberal Democrats	David-Leigh Waters	236	4.8	−0.2
TUSC	Aidan O'Toole	74	1.5	+0.1
Turnout		4,932	34.2	
Rejected ballots		13		
Registered electors		14,433		
Reform gain from Labour				
Reform gain from Labour				
Labour hold				

=== Holbrooks ===
Holbrooks (3 seats)
Party	Candidate	Votes	%	±%
Green	Stephen Gray*	2,098	41.4	+10.2
Green	Esther Reeves*	1,750	34.6	+3.4
Green	Tom Jewell	1,704	33.7	+2.5
Reform	Tony Martin	1,341	26.5	N/A
Reform	Anthony Middleton	1,243	24.6	N/A
Labour	Kevin Hennessy	1,183	23.4	−31.8
Reform	Balhar Singh	1,161	22.9	N/A
Labour	Rachel Lancaster*	1,157	22.9	−32.3
Labour	Sumera Kiani	1,081	21.4	−33.8
Conservative	Anant Agarwal	580	11.5	+0.7
Conservative	John Hargreaves	416	8.2	−2.6
Conservative	Hannah Ejebilagbo	362	7.1	−3.7
Liberal Democrats	Christopher Seeley	146	2.9	N/A
TUSC	Jim Hensman	55	1.1	−1.7
TUSC	Lenny Shail	39	0.8	−2.0
TUSC	Portia O'Toole	32	0.6	−2.2
Turnout		5,088	37.3	
Rejected ballots		25		
Registered electors		13,657		
Green hold				
Green hold				
Green gain from Labour Co-op				

=== Longford ===
Longford (3 seats)
Party	Candidate	Votes	%	±%
Reform	Amor Albert	1,629	35.5	N/A
Labour	Linda Bigham*	1,562	34.1	−31.8
Labour	George Duggins*	1,489	32.5	−33.4
Labour	Lindsley Harvard*	1,422	31.0	−34.9
Reform	Venesa Robinson	1,412	30.8	N/A
Reform	John Quintanilla	1,400	30.5	N/A
Green	Julian Allam	765	16.7	+8.5
Green	Julia Rosenthal-Campuzano	749	16.3	+8.1
Green	Kolapo Abubaicar	725	15.8	+7.6
Conservative	Mike Ballinger	468	10.2	−4.4
Conservative	Sheila Bellamy	458	10.0	−4.6
Conservative	Rafat Rahati	318	6.9	−7.7
Liberal Democrats	Juliet Thomas	260	5.7	+2.2
TUSC	Jim Donnelly	102	2.2	−0.5
Turnout		4,603	32.5	
Rejected ballots		17		
Registered electors		14,175		
Reform gain from Labour				
Labour hold				
Labour hold				

=== Lower Stoke ===
Lower Stoke (3 seats)
Party	Candidate	Votes	%	±%
Labour Co-op	Shahnaz Akhter	1,718	34.3	−27.2
Labour Co-op	Rupinder Singh*	1,690	33.7	−27.8
Labour Co-op	John McNicholas*	1,671	33.3	−28.2
Reform	Craig Bills	1,441	28.7	N/A
Reform	Irena Bosworth	1,339	26.7	N/A
Reform	Avtar Taggar	1,222	24.4	N/A
Green	Chrissie Brown	1,001	20.0	+11.8
Green	Robert Bell	999	19.9	+11.7
Green	David Fuschi	805	16.1	+7.9
Conservative	Lindsey Blundell	656	13.1	−5.6
Conservative	Dhruv Chopra	524	10.4	−8.3
Conservative	Eziamaka Nwakile	447	8.9	−9.8
Independent	Charlie Gordon	308	6.1	N/A
Liberal Democrats	Sean Worrell	253	5.0	+1.0
TUSC	Adam Harmsworth	77	1.5	−1.3
Turnout		5,031	37.0	
Rejected ballots		16		
Registered electors		13,611		
Labour Co-op hold				
Labour Co-op hold				
Labour Co-op hold				

=== Radford ===
Radford (3 seats)
Party	Candidate	Votes	%	±%
Labour	Angela Hopkins	1,583	34.6	−23.4
Labour	Patricia Hetherton*	1,481	32.4	−25.6
Labour	Mal Mutton*	1,367	29.9	−28.1
Reform	Monica Martin	1,268	27.7	N/A
Reform	Keith Ward	1,243	27.2	N/A
Reform	Wasim Chaudhry	1,206	26.4	N/A
Green	Katie Byrne	1,146	25.0	+16.6
Green	Julie Spriddle	910	19.9	+11.5
Green	Amy Worrall	870	19.0	+10.6
Conservative	Don Singh	450	9.8	−7.8
Conservative	Andrew Williams	449	9.8	−7.8
Conservative	Hamaad Khan	424	9.3	−8.3
Liberal Democrats	James Robertson	242	5.3	+0.0
TUSC	Alan Checklin	137	3.0	−0.9
Turnout		4,592	32.6	
Rejected ballots		17		
Registered electors		14,087		
Labour hold				
Labour hold				
Labour hold				

=== Sherbourne ===
Sherbourne (3 seats)
Party	Candidate	Votes	%	±%
Reform	Jackie Gardiner*	2,119	36.9	N/A
Reform	Charles Phillips	1,892	33.0	N/A
Reform	Daniel Stainton	1,828	31.9	N/A
Labour	Bea Christopher	1,622	28.3	−14.5
Labour	Gavin Lloyd*	1,501	26.2	−16.6
Labour	Dave Toulson*	1,421	24.8	−18.0
Green	Georgia Cowie	1,069	18.6	+11.8
Green	Steven Bingham	1,034	18.0	+11.2
Green	David Priestley	870	15.2	+8.4
Conservative	Sam Heslop-Griffin	764	13.3	−25.7
Conservative	Harry Jefferies-Readman	705	12.3	−26.7
Conservative	Ruth Winters	687	12.0	−27.0
Liberal Democrats	Rachel Norwood	369	6.4	+2.8
TUSC	Jane Nellist	213	3.7	+0.1
Turnout		5,745	40.4	
Rejected ballots		8		
Registered electors		14,225		
Reform hold				
Reform gain from Labour				
Reform gain from Labour				

=== St Michael's ===
St Michael's (3 seats)
Party	Candidate	Votes	%	±%
Labour	Naeem Akhtar*	1,633	36.8	−25.3
Green	Matt Greenhalgh	1,554	35.1	+25.9
Labour	Sanjida Jobbar*	1,414	31.9	−30.2
Green	David Ridley	1,411	31.8	+22.6
Labour	Jim O'Boyle*	1405	31.7	−30.4
Green	Victor Squiss-Banigo	1294	29.2	+20.0
Reform	Gary Fripp	587	13.2	N/A
Reform	Andrian Apostol	583	13.2	N/A
Reform	Bradley Robertson	551	12.4	N/A
Conservative	Ian Johnson	476	10.7	+0.9
Conservative	Mary Taylor	431	9.7	−0.1
Conservative	Laura Ridley	429	9.7	−0.1
TUSC	Dave Nellist	280	6.3	−3.4
TUSC	Judy Griffiths	183	4.1	−5.6
Liberal Democrats	Benoit Jones	175	3.9	−0.2
TUSC	Adam Tyas	163	3.7	−6.0
Turnout		4,454	27.7	
Rejected ballots		22		
Registered electors		16,074		
Labour hold				
Green gain from Labour				
Labour hold				

=== Tile Hill & Canley ===
Tile Hill & Canley (3 seats)
Party	Candidate	Votes	%
Reform	Marcus Lapsa*	1,951	36.0
Reform	William Davies	1,945	35.9
Reform	Steve Keough	1,789	33.0
Green	Alysha Cardwell-Kashif	1,170	21.6
Labour	Abdul Jobbar*	1,110	20.5
Green	Josh Sapey	1,098	20.3
Labour	Christine Thomas	1,086	20.1
Labour	Randhir Auluck	1,081	20.0
Green	Bruce Tetlow	980	18.1
Conservative	Alex Clinton-Carter	813	15.0
Independent	Grace Lewis*	765	14.1
Conservative	Nilesh Singh	625	11.5
Conservative	Harrison Smith	594	11.0
Liberal Democrats	Rebecca O'Dell	354	6.5
Turnout		5,426	38.1
Rejected ballots		12	
Registered electors		14,245	
Reform win (new seat)			
Reform win (new seat)			
Reform win (new seat)			

=== Upper Stoke ===
Upper Stoke (3 seats)
Party	Candidate	Votes	%	±%
Labour	Kamran Caan*	1,708	37.4	−20.5
Labour	Amirjit Kaur*	1,506	33.0	−24.9
Labour	Gurdev Hayre*	1,505	33.0	−24.9
Reform	Carole Brightwell	1,440	31.6	N/A
Reform	Dean Brightwell	1,381	30.3	N/A
Reform	Arthur Dorr	1,258	27.6	N/A
Green	Sarah Grayson-Dewis	908	19.9	+11.8
Green	Uilani McLeod	729	16.0	+7.9
Green	Edward Reeves	714	15.7	+7.6
Conservative	Henry Clelland	402	8.8	−5.6
Liberal Democrats	Julia Clarke	350	7.7	+2.4
Conservative	Pauline Venables	332	7.3	−7.1
Conservative	Gaf Rahati	300	6.6	−7.8
TUSC	Terri Rosser	107	2.3	−0.2
Turnout		4,580	34.5	
Rejected ballots		18		
Registered electors		13,274		
Labour hold				
Labour hold				
Labour hold				

=== Wainbody ===
Wainbody (3 seats)
Party	Candidate	Votes	%	±%
Conservative	John Blundell*	2,516	42.2	−7.6
Conservative	Mattie Heaven*	2,475	41.5	−8.3
Conservative	Pratibha Reddy	2,208	37.1	−12.7
Reform	Steve Arnold	1,202	20.2	N/A
Green	Heather Parker	1,126	18.9	+12.0
Green	Alex Grainger	1,123	18.8	+11.9
Labour	Jim Lorimer	1,104	18.5	−16.0
Green	David Hodges	1,064	17.9	+11.0
Labour	Taj Singh	990	16.6	−17.9
Reform	Ashir Anwar	986	16.5	N/A
Labour	Mohammad Fattah	935	15.7	−18.8
Reform	Iddrisu Sufyan	842	14.1	N/A
Liberal Democrats	James Morshead	397	6.7	+2.2
TUSC	Anthony Downes	91	1.5	N/A
Turnout		5,968	50.2	
Rejected ballots		10		
Registered electors		11,889		
Conservative hold				
Conservative hold				
Conservative hold				

=== Whoberley ===
Whoberley (3 seats)
Party	Candidate	Votes	%	±%
Labour	Jayne Innes*	2,026	36.1	−19.5
Labour	Pervez Akhtar*	1,877	33.5	−22.1
Labour	Julie Jones	1,785	31.8	−23.8
Reform	Amanda Bryant	1,670	29.8	N/A
Reform	Glenn Williams	1,601	28.5	N/A
Reform	Peter Evans	1,585	28.3	N/A
Green	Anne Patterson	1,262	22.5	+11.0
Green	Nigel Ely	1,245	22.2	+10.7
Green	Elizabeth Thompson	1,169	20.8	+9.3
Conservative	Diane Crookes	618	11.0	−11.0
Conservative	Subhash Patel	436	7.8	−14.2
Conservative	William Sidhu	436	7.8	−14.2
Liberal Democrats	Rambir Khatkar	271	4.8	−0.5
TUSC	Richard Baker	166	3.0	+1.0
Turnout		5,631	45.4	
Rejected ballots		23		
Registered electors		12,396		
Labour hold				
Labour hold				
Labour hold				

=== Woodlands ===
Woodlands (3 seats)
Party	Candidate	Votes	%	±%
Reform	Adrian Bryant	1,909	35.2	N/A
Conservative	Julia Lepoidevin*	1,827	33.7	−13.8
Reform	Dunc Clark	1,820	33.6	N/A
Reform	Jessica Mason	1,802	33.2	N/A
Conservative	Peter Male*	1,801	33.2	−14.3
Conservative	Gary Ridley*	1,643	30.3	−17.2
Labour	Saheed Awoyemi	790	14.6	−22.6
Labour	Thomas Rider	785	14.5	−22.7
Green	Martin Day	771	14.2	+9.1
Green	Lucy Emke	715	13.2	+8.1
Green	Lesley Sim	642	11.8	+6.7
Labour	Srosh Tahir	603	11.1	−26.1
Liberal Democrats	Jack Leonard	296	5.5	+0.4
Coventry Citizens	Ian Rogers	250	4.6	+1.7
TUSC	Sarah Smith	65	1.2	−0.9
Turnout		5,435	43.2	
Rejected ballots		12		
Registered electors		12,588		
Reform gain from Conservative				
Conservative hold				
Reform gain from Conservative				

=== Wyken ===
Wyken (3 seats)
Party	Candidate	Votes	%	±%
Reform	Frank Beechey	2,131	38,0	N/A
Reform	Dawn McCann	2,060	36.7	N/A
Reform	Andrew Bullock	2,019	36.0	N/A
Labour	Faye Abbott*	1,877	33.4	−13.9
Labour	Mohinder Dhadda	1,587	28.3	−19.0
Labour	Saeeda Tauseef	1,381	24.6	−22.7
Green	Mark Harrison	891	15.9	+9.4
Conservative	Maddie Brown	816	14.5	−21.6
Green	Jordan McCaffrey	731	13.0	+6.5
Green	Kirthika Naguleswaran-Clarke	687	12.2	+5.7
Conservative	Ioannis Kalianidis	607	10.8	−25.3
Conservative	Farzad Misaghi	505	9.0	−27.1
Liberal Democrats	Andre Soares	319	5.7	+2.4
Coventry Citizens	Gary Cooper	209	3.7	−1.4
TUSC	Stephen Archer	112	2.0	+0.3
Turnout		5,636	40.6	
Rejected ballots		24		
Registered electors		13,875		
Reform gain from Labour				
Reform gain from Labour				
Reform gain from Labour				
