= John Mutton =

John Mutton may refer to:

- John Mutton (British politician) (1947–2022)
- John Mutton (Canadian politician) (born c. 1966)
- Jack Mutton (1915–2006), Australian politician
