= John Mutton (British politician) =

British politician (1947–2022)

John Roderick Mutton (20 September 1947 – 15 May 2022) was a British politician. He was the Labour group leader on Coventry City Council from May 2003 until May 2013, Leader of Coventry City Council from 2010 to 2013 and Lord Mayor of Coventry in 1997.

In 2010, John Mutton told The New York Times, regarding British government cuts in spending: "It feels like they’re just sticking a finger in the air and guessing."

Mutton lost his position as Labour group leader in May 2013 in a leadership election that was won by Ann Lucas, which had been predicted. After losing the election, he became a member of a special committee appointed to oversee the Ricoh Arena.

In 2013, Mutton started an e-mail chain amongst Labour Party members making jokes about Margaret Thatcher's funeral. When the e-mail was made public he was forced by the national party leaders to make an apology.

John Mutton died Sunday 15 May 2022, having only been reelected as a councillor the same month.
