= 2021 Coventry City Council election =

2021 UK local government election

Map showing the results of the 2021 Coventry City Council election

The 2021 Coventry City Council election took place on 6 May 2021 to elect members of Coventry City Council in England. This was on the same day as other local elections, including the West Midlands mayoral election. One-third of the council's seats were up for election.

== Results summary ==
2021 Coventry City Council election
Party	This election			Full council			This election		
Party	Seats	Net	Seats %	Other	Total	Total %	Votes	Votes %	+/−
Labour	13	▼1	68.4	26	39	72.2	33,833	43.6	▼2.1
Conservative	6	▲1	31.6	9	15	27.8	25,965	33.4	▲6.5
Green	0	Steady	0.0	0	0	0.0	6,711	8.6	▼3.3
Coventry Citizens	0	Steady	0.0	0	0	0.0	3,516	4.5	New
Liberal Democrats	0	Steady	0.0	0	0	0.0	3,329	4.3	▲2.4
Independent	0	Steady	0.0	0	0	0.0	3,105	4.0	▲3.2
TUSC	0	Steady	0.0	0	0	0.0	1,108	1.4	New
Reform UK	0	Steady	0.0	0	0	0.0	80	0.1	New

== Ward results ==
=== Bablake ===
Bablake
Party	Candidate	Votes	%	±%
Conservative	Steve Keough	1,645	35.3	−4.4
Labour	Balvinder Kaur	1,304	28.0	−1.7
Independent	Glenn Williams	1,226	26.3	N/A
Green	Niall Webb	273	5.9	−8.0
Coventry Citizens	Tony Middleton	132	2.8	N/A
Liberal Democrats	Mark James Perryman	74	1.6	N/A
Majority		341	7.3	
Turnout		4,654		
Conservative gain from Independent		Swing	▼1.4	

=== Binley and Willenhall ===
Binley and Willenhall
Party	Candidate	Votes	%	±%
Labour	Christine Thomas	1,430	37.4	−8.5
Conservative	Amarjit Khangura	1,167	30.5	+12.6
Coventry Citizens	Paul Cowley	817	21.4	N/A
Green	Danny Foulstone	213	5.6	−3.1
Liberal Democrats	Nigel Plowman	158	4.1	N/A
TUSC	Michael Morgan	37	1.0	N/A
Majority		263	6.9	
Turnout		3,822		
Labour hold		Swing	▼12.6	

=== Cheylesmore ===
Cheylesmore
Party	Candidate	Votes	%	±%
Conservative	Barbara Catharina Mosterman	2,003	47.0	+11.7
Labour	Rois Ali	1,520	35.7	−7.8
Green	John Verdult	336	7.9	−5.9
Liberal Democrats	Anna Granger	211	5.0	−2.4
Coventry Citizens	Nate Lewis	122	2.9	N/A
TUSC	Judy Griffiths	70	1.6	N/A
Majority		483	11.3	
Turnout		4,262		
Conservative gain from Labour		Swing	▲9.8	

=== Earlsdon ===
Earlsdon
Party	Candidate	Votes	%	±%
Labour	Antony Tucker	2,619	43.6	+1.6
Conservative	Zaid Rehman	2,133	35.5	−4.4
Liberal Democrats	Stephen Richmond	590	9.8	+2.1
Green	John Finlayson	364	6.1	−4.3
Coventry Citizens	Cameron Baxter	252	4.2	N/A
TUSC	Adam Harmsworth	52	0.9	N/A
Majority		486	8.1	
Turnout		6,010		
Labour gain from Conservative		Swing	▲3.0	

=== Foleshill ===
Foleshill
Party	Candidate	Votes	%	±%
Labour	Shakila Nazir	2,019	45.6	−30.5
Independent	Zia Khan	1,536	34.7	N/A
Conservative	Raja Meesala	440	9.9	−5.2
Green	David Priestley	172	3.9	−5.0
Coventry Citizens	Nicola Spalding	123	2.8	N/A
TUSC	Jim Hensman	67	1.5	N/A
Liberal Democrats	Paul Newland	66	1.5	N/A
Majority		483	10.9	
Turnout		4,423		
Labour hold		Swing	▼32.6	

=== Henley ===
Henley
Party	Candidate	Votes	%	±%
Labour	Ed Ruane	2,237	56.1	+5.8
Conservative	Laura Frances Ridley	1,154	29.0	+12.7
Green	Lesley Clare Sim	219	5.5	−3.8
Coventry Citizens	Charlie Ann Wilson	162	4.1	N/A
Liberal Democrats	Thomas Andrew Shakespeare	156	3.9	N/A
TUSC	Ian Christopher Wardle	57	1.4	N/A
Majority		1,083	27.1	
Turnout		3,985		
Labour hold		Swing	▼3.5	

=== Holbrook ===
Holbrook
Party	Candidate	Votes	%	±%
Labour	Rachel Lancaster	1,744	43.0	−7.3
Green	Stephen Robert George Gray	1,419	35.0	+14.8
Conservative	Zeeshan Qazi	668	16.5	+1.1
Coventry Citizens	Alan Gavin	166	4.1	N/A
Liberal Democrats	Anna Margaret Richmond	59	1.5	N/A
Majority		355	8.0	
Turnout		4,056		
Labour hold		Swing	▼11.1	

=== Longford ===
Longford
Party	Candidate	Votes	%	±%
Labour	George Arthur Duggins	2,229	57.0	−0.7
Conservative	Balbir Singh Dhami	861	22.0	+10.3
Independent	Jim Bench	343	8.8	−1.5
Green	Joe McAvoy-Boss	188	4.8	−1.7
Liberal Democrats	Jaspal Singh Bahara	151	3.9	N/A
Coventry Citizens	Ian Arthur Rogers	139	3.6	N/A
Majority		1,368	35.0	
Turnout		3,911		
Labour hold		Swing	▼5.5	

=== Lower Stoke ===
Lower Stoke
Party	Candidate	Votes	%	±%
Labour	Catherine Miks	2,327	53.0	−2.0
Conservative	Michael Arthur Ballinger	1,229	28.0	+15.3
Green	Esther Mary Reeves	393	9.0	−4.6
Coventry Citizens	Lorna Karen Williams	174	4.0	N/A
Liberal Democrats	Andre Escorcio Rodrigues Soares	168	3.8	N/A
TUSC	John O'Sullivan	100	2.3	N/A
Majority		1,098	25.0	
Turnout		4,391		
Labour hold		Swing	▼8.7	

=== Radford ===
Radford
Party	Candidate	Votes	%	±%
Labour	Mal Mutton	1,846	54.1	−0.3
Conservative	Neil Worwood	835	24.5	+10.1
Green	Jules Spriddle	299	8.8	−1.6
Coventry Citizens	Irena Bosworth	187	5.5	N/A
TUSC	Dave Anderson	124	3.6	N/A
Liberal Democrats	Jonathan David Ward	121	3.5	N/A
Majority		1,011	29.6	
Turnout		3,412		
Labour hold		Swing	▼5.2	

=== Sherbourne ===
Sherbourne
Party	Candidate	Votes	%	±%
Conservative	Ryan Martin Thomas Simpson	1,771	42.2	+9.2
Labour	Amanda Eccles	1,672	39.8	+5.1
Green	George Brian Teggin	361	8.6	−2.9
Liberal Democrats	Nukey Proctor	189	4.5	−1.9
Coventry Citizens	Sian Jones	143	3.4	N/A
TUSC	Aidan Spencer O'Toole	62	1.5	N/A
Majority		99	2.4	
Turnout		4,198		
Conservative gain from Labour		Swing	▲2.1	

=== St Michael's ===
St Michael's
Party	Candidate	Votes	%	±%
Labour	Naeem Akhtar	2,028	66.6	−1.9
Conservative	Daniel James Partington	385	12.6	+3.9
TUSC	Dave Nellist	274	9.0	N/A
Green	Allan Aspinall	166	5.4	−2.0
Coventry Citizens	Karen Wilson	100	3.3	N/A
Liberal Democrats	Benoit David Jones	94	3.1	N/A
Majority		1,643	54.0	
Turnout		3,047		
Labour hold		Swing	▼2.9	

=== Upper Stoke ===
Upper Stoke
Party	Candidate	Votes	%	±%
Labour	Kamran Asif Caan	1,865	53.9	+3.5
Conservative	Gurdeep Singh Sohal	900	26.0	+5.7
Green	Laura Katerhine Vesty	289	8.3	−4.6
Liberal Democrats	Caroline Dorothy Solange Spence	179	5.2	N/A
Coventry Citizens	Thomas Watts	168	4.9	N/A
TUSC	Terri Hersey	62	1.8	N/A
Majority		965	27.9	
Turnout		3,463		
Labour hold		Swing	▼1.1	

=== Wainbody ===
Wainbody
Party	Candidate	Votes	%	±%
Conservative	John Anthony Blundell	2,427	55.6	+7.8
Labour	John Philip Tallentire	1,324	30.3	+3.9
Green	Becky Finlayson	310	7.1	−3.8
Liberal Democrats	James Morshead	213	4.9	−4.1
Coventry Citizens	George Ireland	93	2.1	N/A
Majority		1,103	25.3	
Turnout		4,367		
Conservative hold		Swing	▲2.0	

=== Westwood ===
Westwood
Party	Candidate	Votes	%	±%
Conservative	Asha Masih	1,816	44.2	+3.1
Labour	Abdul Jobbar	1,382	33.6	+1.1
Green	Jess Marshall	454	11.0	−1.3
Liberal Democrats	Jamie Simpson	191	4.6	N/A
Coventry Citizens	Danielle Stringfellow	101	2.5	N/A
TUSC	Jim Donneley	85	2.1	N/A
Reform UK	Iddrisu Sufyan	80	1.9	N/A
Majority		434	12.6	
Turnout		4,109		
Conservative hold		Swing	▲1.0	

=== Whoberley ===
Whoberley
Party	Candidate	Votes	%	±%
Labour	Jayne Innes	1,936	47.5	+2.2
Conservative	Jackie Gardiner	1,310	32.1	+11.2
Green	Anne Patterson	500	12.3	−8.6
Liberal Democrats	Russell David Field	195	4.8	N/A
Coventry Citizens	Teri Fogden	138	3.4	N/A
Majority		626	15.4	
Turnout		4,079		
Labour hold		Swing	▼4.5	

=== Woodlands ===
Woodlands
Party	Candidate	Votes	%	±%
Conservative	Gary Christopher Ridley	2,773	57.8	+9.7
Labour	Mark Leslie Farr	1,454	30.3	+0.3
Liberal Democrats	Andy Hilton	254	5.3	N/A
Green	Sudhir Kumar Sard	152	3.2	−6.7
Coventry Citizens	Marcus Luke Paris Fogden	110	2.3	N/A
TUSC	Sarah Stephanie Smith	58	1.2	N/A
Majority		1,319	27.5	
Turnout		4,801		
Conservative hold		Swing	▲4.7	

=== Wyken ===
Wyken
Party	Candidate	Votes	%
Labour	Angela Betty Hopkins	1,504	38.9
Labour	Robert Richard Thay	1,393	36.0
Conservative	Manjeet Rai	1,304	33.7
Conservative	Myooran Srikantha	1,144	29.6
Green	Chrissie Lynn Brown	348	9.0
Liberal Democrats	Juliet Emily Sarah Thomas	260	6.7
Green	Cathy Wattebot	255	6.6
Coventry Citizens	Gary Ronald Cooper	195	5.0
Coventry Citizens	Sunny Singh Braitch	194	5.0
TUSC	Farie Madzikanda	60	1.6
Turnout		3,870	
Labour hold			
Labour hold			
