= 2011 Coventry City Council election =

2011 UK local government election

Map of the 2011 Coventry election. Conservatives in blue, Labour in red

Elections for Coventry City Council were held on Thursday 5 May 2011. As the council is elected by thirds, one seat in each of the wards was up for election. The vote took place alongside the 2011 United Kingdom Alternative Vote referendum.

Labour took five seats (Bablake, Sherbourne, Westwood, Whoberley, and Woodlands) from the Conservatives, and retained control of the council with an increased majority, holding 35 out of 54 seats.

During the election count, a box of ballot papers for Cheylesmore ward was misplaced. Before they were discovered, Councillor Kevin Foster was about to concede that he had lost his seat, although after the additional votes were counted he had retained it.

== Election results ==
Coventry City Council Election, 2011
Party	Seats	Gains	Losses	Net gain/loss	Seats %	Votes %	Votes	+/−
Labour	15	+5	0	+5	83.33%	54.60%	45,537	+12.31%
Conservative	3	0	-5	-5	16.67%	26.50%	22,104	-2.01%
Liberal Democrats	0	0	0	0	0	5.18%	4,320	-12.52%
Green	0	0	0	0	0	4.94%	4,121	+3.61%
Socialist Alternative	0	0	0	0	0	3.69%	3,081	+0.61%
BNP	0	0	0	0	0	3.65%	3,045	-0.93%
UKIP	0	0	0	0	0	0.85%	708	+0.18%
Independent	0	0	0	0	0	0.58%	484	-1.14%

== Council composition ==
The composition of the council before and after the election can be found in the following table:

Party	Previous council	Staying councillors	Seats up for election	Election result	New council
Labour	30	20	10	15	35
Conservative	22	14	8	3	17
Socialist Alternative	1	1	0	0	1
Liberal Democrats	1	1	0	0	1
Green	0	0	0	0	0
BNP	0	0	0	0	0
UKIP	0	0	0	0	0
Independent	0	0	0	0	0
Total	54	36	18	18	54

== Ward results ==
Bablake Ward
Party	Candidate	Votes	%	±%
Labour	David Edwin Kershaw	2687	48.85%	+16.6%
Conservative	Laura Frances Dodd	1873	34.05%	−0.6%
Green	Walter William Milner	233	4.24%	N/A
Liberal Democrats	Peter Simpson	231	4.20%	−13.1%
BNP	Philip Mark Jones	208	3.78%	−2.4%
Socialist Alternative	Hannah Grace Seaman	45	0.82%	−0.5%
Majority		814	14.8%	
Turnout		5500	42.65%	
Labour gain from Conservative		Swing		

Note: the Green Party candidate stood in this ward as an independent at the last election, so it could be argued that he had a swing of -4.2%

Binley and Willenhall Ward
Party	Candidate	Votes	%	±%
Labour	Ram Lakha	2436	58.36%	+11.8%
Conservative	Jonathan George Smith	970	23.24%	−0.4%
UKIP	Colin Aldous Stubbs	329	7.88%	+1.5%
BNP	Dave Clarke	207	4.96%	−0.6%
Green	Steven Adams	123	2.95%	+1.2%
Socialist Alternative	Lindsay Margaret Currie	79	1.89%	+0.5%
Majority		1466	35.12%	
Turnout		4174	33.16%	
Labour hold		Swing		

Cheylesmore Ward
Party	Candidate	Votes	%	±%
Conservative	Kevin John Foster	2493	48.19	+11.69
Labour	Alison Gingell	2188	42.30	+4.5
Green	John Verdult	331	6.40	+2.3
Socialist Alternative	Judy Griffiths	161	3.11	−0.09
Majority		305	5.90	+4.59
Turnout		5173	41.96	−23.84
Conservative hold		Swing		

Earlsdon Ward
Party	Candidate	Votes	%	±%
Conservative	Kenneth John Taylor	2596	43.08	+7.08
Labour	John Fletcher	2482	41.19	+7.39
Liberal Democrats	Greg Paul Judge	469	7.78	−15.92
Green	Scott Redding	343	5.69	+1.09
Socialist Alternative	Thomas Allan House	136	2.26	+0.36
Majority		114	1.89	−0.26
Turnout		6026	48.76	−23.84
Conservative hold		Swing		

Foleshill Ward
Party	Candidate	Votes	%	±%
Labour	Abdul Salam Khan	3184	66.90%	+11.2
Conservative	Shabbir Ahmed	1124	23.62%	−6.58
Green	Gavin Collins	133	2.79%	N/A
BNP	Berry Booton	125	2.63%	−0.37
Liberal Democrats	Scott Martin Tallis	116	2.44%	−4.66
Socialist Alternative	Jim Hensman	77	1.62%	+0.02
Majority		2060	43.29	+36.45
Turnout		4759	39.35%	−0.49
Labour hold		Swing		

Henley Ward
Party	Candidate	Votes	%	±%
Labour	Lynette Catherine Kelly	2409	57.36%	+15.76
Liberal Democrats	Brian David Patton	1170	27.86%	+0.76
BNP	Leisel Dawn Wagstaff	337	8.02%	−4.6
Green	George Robinson	171	4.07%	N/A
Socialist Alternative	Josie Kenny	113	2.69%	+0.59
Majority		1239	29.50%	+15.08
Turnout		4281	32.18%	
Labour hold		Swing	-23.82	

Note: The Conservative Party candidate for Henley, Steven Henry Charles Keough, withdrew his nomination.

Holbrook Ward
Party	Candidate	Votes	%	±%
Labour	Joe Clifford	2793	65.43%	+13.43
Conservative	Charles Cox	897	21.01%	+2.81
BNP	John Hurren	252	5.90%	−0.8
Green	Danny Foulstone	243	5.69%	+3.79
Socialist Alternative	Richard Marcus Charles Groves	57	1.34%	−0.16
Majority		1896	44.41%	+22.57
Turnout		4269	34.4%	−24.6
Labour hold		Swing		

Longford Ward
Party	Candidate	Votes	%	±%
Labour	Linda Joyce Bigham	3036	72.53%	
Conservative	Will Jones	602	14.38%	
BNP	Keith Oxford	253	6.04%	
Green	John Edward Griffiths	165	3.94%	
Socialist Alternative	James Daryl Edgar	101	2.41%	
Majority		2434		
Turnout		4186	31.4%	
Labour hold		Swing		

Lower Stoke Ward
Party	Candidate	Votes	%	±%
Labour	John Douglas McNicholas	2608	57.19%	
Conservative	Nick Williams	1018	22.32%	
Green	Laura Vesty	353	7.74%	
Socialist Alternative	Robert McArdle	291	6.38%	
BNP	Mary Jane Nicholls	261	5.72%	
Majority		1590		
Turnout		4560	34.7%	
Labour hold		Swing		

Radford Ward
Party	Candidate	Votes	%	±%
Labour	Tony Skipper	2607	64.87%	
Conservative	Gareth Fowler	699	17.39%	
Green	Stephen Gray	226	5.62%	
BNP	Hunter Helmsley	205	5.10%	
Independent	John Joseph Ryan	159	3.96%	
Socialist Alternative	Glen Watson	94	2.34%	
Majority		1908		
Turnout		4019	29.95%	
Labour hold		Swing		

Sherbourne Ward
Party	Candidate	Votes	%	±%
Labour	Damian Gannon	2606	55.17%	
Conservative	Jane Marie Williams	1281	27.12%	
Liberal Democrats	Jamie Simpson	281	5.95%	
Green	Justin Timothy Wood	220	4.66%	
BNP	Frank Thomas Bates	195	4.13%	
Socialist Alternative	Jason Arnold Toynbee	117	2.48%	
Majority		1325		
Turnout		4724	37.65%	
Labour gain from Conservative		Swing		

St. Michael's Ward
Party	Candidate	Votes	%	±%
Labour	Jim O'Boyle	2419	58.07%	
Socialist Alternative	Rob Windsor	1263	30.32%	
Conservative	Dial Masih	434	10.42%	
Majority		1156		
Turnout		4166	26.67%	
Labour hold		Swing		

Upper Stoke Ward
Party	Candidate	Votes	%	±%
Labour	Colleen Margaret Fletcher	2536	58.69%	
Liberal Democrats	Derek Stephen Benefield	799	18.49%	
Conservative	Denise Beech	508	11.76%	
BNP	Darren Thomas	193	4.47%	
Green	John Halpin	159	3.68%	
Socialist Alternative	Paul Stephen Smith	95	2.20%	
Majority		1737	40.20%	
Turnout		4321	33%	
Labour hold		Swing		

Wainbody Ward
Party	Candidate	Votes	%	±%
Conservative	Tim Sawdon	2452	43.58%	
Labour	Sundeep Singh	1909	33.93%	
Liberal Democrats	Napier Penlington	410	7.29%	
Green	Rachel Adshead	393	6.99%	
UKIP	Mark Taylor	379	6.74%	
Socialist Alternative	Daniel Crowter	83	1.48%	
Majority		543	9.65%	
Turnout		5626	45%	
Conservative hold		Swing		

Westwood Ward
Party	Candidate	Votes	%	±%
Labour	Richard Sandy	2184	46.88%	
Conservative	Nigel Charles Lee	1793	38.48%	
Green	Merle Gering	291	6.25%	
BNP	Mark Badrick	256	5.49%	
Socialist Alternative	James Richard Donnelly	95	2.04%	
Majority		391	8.39%	
Turnout		4659	36.00%	
Labour gain from Conservative		Swing		

Whoberley Ward
Party	Candidate	Votes	%	±%
Labour	Dan Howells	2561	50.45	+15.46%
Conservative	Ken Charley	1392	27.42	−1.82%
Green	Jo Rathbone	330	6.50	+4.70%
Liberal Democrats	Brian Rees Lewis	295	5.81	−15.82%
BNP	Tom Gower	270	5.32	+0.44%
Independent	Martyn Warwick Richards	119	2.34	n/a
Socialist Alternative	Teresa Chalcroft	109	2.15	−0.49%
Majority		1169	23.03	
Turnout		5076	40.9	
Labour gain from Conservative		Swing		

Woodlands Ward
Party	Candidate	Votes	%	±%
Labour	Patricia Hetherton	2286	42.96	+7.03%
Conservative	Christian Michael Cliffe	1972	37.06	+0.89%
Liberal Democrats	Jacqueline Bridget Basu	549	10.32	−7.27%
BNP	David John White	283	5.32	−1.72%
Green	Dan Gower	187	3.51	+1.40%
Socialist Alternative	Lenny Shail	44	0.83	−0.32%
Majority		318	5.90	
Turnout		5321	40.9	
Labour gain from Conservative		Swing		

Wyken Ward
Party	Candidate	Votes	%	±%
Labour	Hazel Jean Sweet	2606	53.40	+7.03%
Conservative	Jaswant Singh Birdi	1727	35.39	+3.58%
Green	Cathy Wattebot	220	4.51	n/a
Independent	Adrian Roll	206	4.22	n/a
Socialist Alternative	Jodie Michelle Hannis	121	2.48	−0.90%
Majority		879	18.01	
Turnout		4880	38.6	
Labour hold		Swing		
