= 2010 Coventry City Council election =

2010 UK local government election

Map of the results of the 2010 Coventry election. Conservatives in blue, Labour in red

Elections for Coventry City Council were held on Thursday 6 May 2010. As the council is elected by thirds, one seat in each of the wards was up for election.

Labour gained five seats (Cheylesmore, Foleshill, Sherbourne, Whoberley, Wyken) from the Conservatives and one seat (St Michael's) from the Socialist Party. As a result, Labour gained control of the council, with 30 out of 54 seats.

A general election was held on the same day, which accounts for the higher turnout.

== Election results ==
Coventry local election result 2010
Party	Seats	Gains	Losses	Net gain/loss	Seats %	Votes %	Votes	+/−
Labour	13	6	0	+6	72.22	42.29	57,686	+6.69
Conservative	5	0	5	-5	27.78	28.51	38,891	-9.41
Liberal Democrats	0	0	0	0	0.00	17.70	24,141	+9.63
BNP	0	0	0	0	0.00	4.58	6,248	-3.32
Socialist Alternative	0	0	1	-1	0.00	3.08	4,204	+0.34
Independent	0	0	0	0	0.00	1.72	2,348	-0.94
Green	0	0	0	0	0.00	1.33	1,810	-3.78
UKIP	0	0	0	0	0.00	0.67	912	N/A
Christian Movement for Great Britain	0	0	0	0	0.00	0.12	160	N/A

== Council Composition ==
The composition of the council before and after the election can be found in the following table:

Party	Previous council	Staying councillors	Seats up for election	Election result	New council
Labour	24	17	7	13	30
Conservative	27	17	10	5	22
Socialist Alternative	2	1	1	0	1
Liberal Democrats	1	1	0	0	1
BNP	0	0	0	0	0
Independent	0	0	0	0	0
Green	0	0	0	0	0
UKIP	0	0	0	0	0
Total	54	36	18	18	54

== Ward results ==
Bablake ward
Party	Candidate	Votes	%	±%
Conservative	Andrew John Williams	2,902	34.6	
Labour	Randhir Auluck	2,715	32.3	
Liberal Democrats	Peter Simpson	1455	17.3	
Independent	Walter William Milner	703	8.4	
BNP	Mark Badrick	518	6.2	
Socialist Alternative	Hannah Grace Seaman	105	1.3	
Majority		187		
Turnout		8440	68.5	
Conservative hold		Swing		

Binley and Willenhall ward
Party	Candidate	Votes	%	±%
Labour	John Mutton	3,246	46.6	
Conservative	Ric Richards	1,641	23.6	
Liberal Democrats	Phillip Edward Banner	1,019	14.6	
UKIP	Colin Stubbs	442	6.4	
BNP	Jade Fahey	391	5.6	
Green	Andrew Stephen Jones	126	1.8	
Socialist Alternative	Lindsay Currie	94	1.4	
Majority		1,605	22.95	
Turnout		6993	57.3	
Labour hold		Swing		

Cheylesmore ward
Party	Candidate	Votes	%	±%
Labour	Harjinder Singh Sehmi	3,040	37.8	
Conservative	Linda Ann Reece	2,934	36.5	
Liberal Democrats	Napier Penlington	1,489	18.5	
Green	John Verdult	327	4.1	
Socialist Alternative	Matthew John Fisher	257	3.2	
Majority		106	1.31	
Turnout		8084	65.8	
Labour gain from Conservative		Swing		

Earlsdon ward
Party	Candidate	Votes	%	±%
Conservative	Michael Antony Hammon	3,207	36.0	
Labour	Christopher Nicholas Youett	3,014	33.8	
Liberal Democrats	Derek Stephen Benefield	2111	23.7	
Green	Scott Redding	408	4.6	
Socialist Alternative	Thomas Allan House	172	1.9	
Majority		193	2.15	
Turnout		8967	72.6	
Conservative hold		Swing		

Foleshill ward
Party	Candidate	Votes	%	±%
Labour	Tariq Khan	3,703	55.7	
Conservative	Altaf Adalat Jim	2,008	30.2	
Liberal Democrats	Scott Martin Tallis	469	7.1	
BNP	Paul Jones	200	3.0	
Christian Movement for Great Britain	Ron Lebar	160	2.4	
Socialist Alternative	Jim Hensman	105	1.6	
Majority		295	6.84	
Turnout		4,311	39.84	
Labour gain from Conservative		Swing		

Henley ward
Party	Candidate	Votes	%	±%
Labour	Kevin Barry Maton	2,994	41.6	
Liberal Democrats	Brian David Patton	1951	27.1	
Conservative	Will Jones	1519	21.1	
BNP	Tom Gower	577	12.62	
Socialist Alternative	Josie Kenny	154	2.1	
Majority		1043	14.42	
Turnout		7,231	56	
Labour hold		Swing		

Holbrook ward
Party	Candidate	Votes	%	±%
Labour	Ann Lucas	3,731	52.0	
Conservative	Vinod Kumar	1,303	18.2	
Liberal Democrats	Geoffrey Brian Sewards	956	13.3	
BNP	Leisel Dawn Wagstaff	483	6.7	
Independent	Sue Smith	461	6.4	
Green	Danny Foulstone	137	1.9	
Socialist Alternative	Glen Martin Watson	105	1.5	
Majority		2,428	21.84	33.66
Turnout		7,213	59.0	
Labour hold		Swing		

Longford ward
Party	Candidate	Votes	%	±%
Labour	Lindsley Harvard	3,623	50.3	
Conservative	Jaswant Singh Birdi	1393	19.3	
Liberal Democrats	Adam James Curran	1065	14.8	
BNP	Darren Thomas	498	6.9	
UKIP	Aaron Davies	470	6.5	
Socialist Alternative	Clive Dunkley	152	2.1	
Majority		2,558	35.31	
Turnout		7,244	56.2	
Labour hold		Swing		

Lower Stoke ward
Party	Candidate	Votes	%	±%
Labour	Phil Townshend	3,535	47.3	
Conservative	Sarah Chen	1,647	22.0	
Liberal Democrats	Thomas George Wood	1,264	16.9	
BNP	Davied Edward Clarke	503	6.7	
Socialist Alternative	Richard Marcus Charles Groves	273	3.7	
Green	Laura Vesty	256	3.4	
Majority		1,888	25.12	
Turnout		12,772	58.8	
Labour hold		Swing		

Radford ward
Party	Candidate	Votes	%	±%
Labour	Kieran Mulhall	3,580	52.2	
Conservative	Jane Marie Williams	1,279	18.6	
Liberal Democrats	James Peter John Simpson	1,091	15.9	
BNP	Philip Mark Jones	415	6.0	
Green	Justin Timothy Wood	208	3.0	
Independent	John Joseph Ryan	127	1.9	
Socialist Alternative	Lenny Shail	99	1.4	
Independent	Dave Anderson	61	0.9	
Majority		2,301	33.39	
Turnout		6,892	53.0	
Labour hold		Swing		

Sherbourne ward
Party	Candidate	Votes	%	±%
Labour	Seamus Walsh	3,208	42.3	
Conservative	David Arrowsmith	2,010	27.3	
Liberal Democrats	Vincent McKee	1,353	17.9	
BNP	John Paul Hurren	434	5.7	
Green	Stephen Robert George Gray	205	2.7	
Socialist Alternative	Jason Arnold Toynbee	163	2.2	
Independent	Kirpal Singh	143	1.9	
Majority		1,138	14.96	
Turnout		7,609	62.7	
Labour hold		Swing		

St Michael's ward
Party	Candidate	Votes	%	±%
Labour	David Stuart Welsh	2,958	48.1	
Socialist Alternative	Rob Windsor	1,783	48.64	
Conservative	Maya Ali	1,403	22.8	
Majority		1,715	18.92	
Turnout		6,211	43.2	
Labour gain from Socialist Alternative		Swing		

Upper Stoke ward
Party	Candidate	Votes	%	±%
Labour	Sucha Bains	3,439	47.7	
Liberal Democrats	Nick Solman	1,983	27.5	
Conservative	Val Stone	1127	15.6	
BNP	Jason Mundy	480	6.7	
Socialist Alternative	Paul Stephen Smith	185	2.6	
Majority		1,456	20.07	
Turnout		3,854	31.39	
Labour hold		Swing		

Wainbody ward
Party	Candidate	Votes	%	±%
Conservative	Gary Crookes	3,641	43.3	
Labour	Sundeep Singh Virk	2,457	29.2	
Liberal Democrats	Jacqueline Bridget Basu	1,830	21.8	
BNP	Mary Jane Nicholls	217	2.6	
Independent	Alex Iwanczuk	190	2.3	
Socialist Alternative	Fiona Pashazadeh	75	0.9	
Majority		1,184	13.96	
Turnout		8,483	67.4	
Conservative hold		Swing		

Westwood ward
Party	Candidate	Votes	%	±%
Conservative	David John Skinner	2,803	43.16	
Labour	Bilal Akhtar	2,767	35.3	
Liberal Democrats	Terence Kenny	1,352	17.3	
BNP	David Clarke	521	6.7	
Independent	Merle Ross Gering	281	3.6	
Socialist Alternative	James Richard Donnelly	109	1.4	
Majority		36	0.46	
Turnout		7,869	61.7	
Conservative hold		Swing		

Whoberley ward
Party	Candidate	Votes	%	±%
Labour	Bally Singh	2,781	35.0	
Conservative	Cliff Ridge	2,324	29.2	
Liberal Democrats	Brian Rees Lewis	1,719	21.6	
BNP	Keith Oxford	388	4.9	
Independent	Steve Mahoney	382	4.8	
Socialist Alternative	Teresa Chalcroft	210	2.6	
Green	Martin Lyle	143	1.8	
Majority		457	5.73	
Turnout		7,979	64.4	
Labour gain from Conservative		Swing		

Woodlands ward
Party	Candidate	Votes	%	±%
Conservative	Julia Elizabeth Lepoidevn	3,203	36.2	
Labour	Damian Gannon	3,182	35.9	
Liberal Democrats	Charles Coleman	1,558	17.6	
BNP	David John White	623	7.0	
Green	Daniel John Gower	187	2.1	
Socialist Alternative	James Daryl Edgar	102	1.2	
Majority		21	0.24	
Turnout		8,883	68.2	
Conservative hold		Swing		

Wyken ward
Party	Candidate	Votes	%	±%
Labour	Faye Abbott	3,713	46.4	
Conservative	Angela Marie Waters	2,547	31.8	
Liberal Democrats	Beverley Elizabeth Patton	1,476	18.4	
Socialist Alternative	Kyly Emmeline Wilson	271	3.4	
Majority		1,116	14.48	
Turnout		8,050	64.6	
Labour gain from Conservative		Swing		
