= Coventry City Council =

Local government body in England

- Third of council elected three years out of four
- Coat of arms

- Council logo

Type
- Type: Metropolitan borough

Leadership
- Lord Mayor: Roger Bailey, Conservative since 21 May 2026
- Leader: George Duggins, Labour since 19 May 2016
- Chief Executive: Julie Nugent since 2023

Structure
- Seats: 54 councillors
- Graph of the party split among 54 seats.
- Political groups: Administration (24) Labour (24) Other parties (30) Reform (20) Conservative (6) Green (4)

Elections
- Voting system: First past the post
- Last election: 7 May 2026
- Next election: 6 May 2027

Motto
- Camera Principis

Meeting place
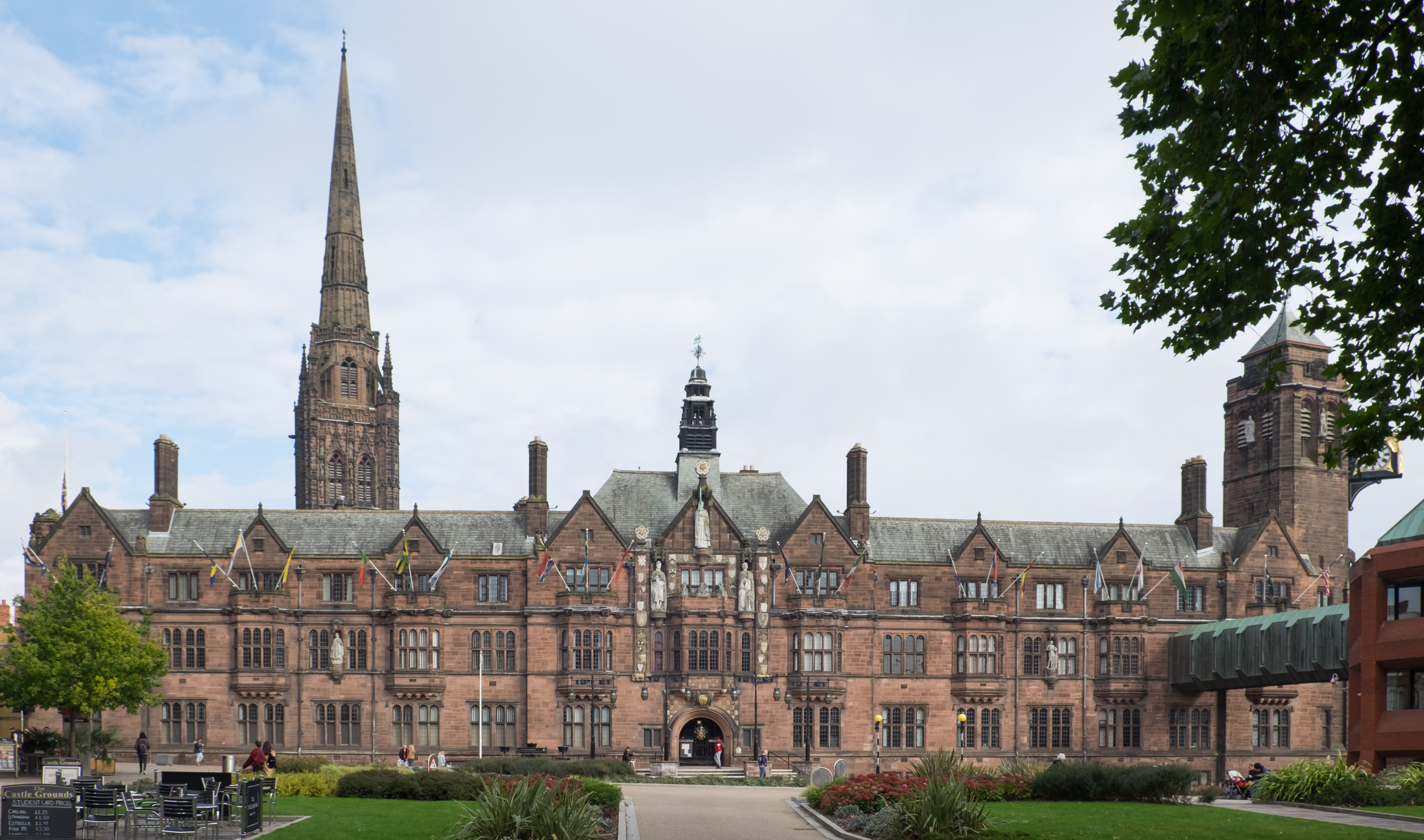
- Council House, Earl Street, Coventry, CV1 5RR

Website
- www.coventry.gov.uk

Coventry City Council is the local authority for the city of Coventry in the West Midlands, England. Coventry has had a council from medieval times, which has been reformed on numerous occasions. Since 1974 the council has been a metropolitan borough council. It provides the majority of local government services in the city. The council has been a member of the West Midlands Combined Authority since 2016.

The council meets at the Council House and has its main offices at Friargate. The council has been under no overall control since the 2026 election, being run by a Labour minority administration.

== History ==
Coventry was an ancient borough. The earliest known charter, concerning the establishment of St Mary's Priory and its relationship with the town, dates from 1043. Coventry gained city status in 1102 when papal authorisation was given for the Bishop of Lichfield moving the seat of the diocese to the priory at Coventry.

The city was administered in a fragmented fashion between the twelfth and fourteenth centuries, with a "Prior's Half" controlled by the bishops and priory, and an "Earl's Half" controlled by the Earls of Chester. The halves were united in 1345 when a new charter was issued to the city by Edward III, which also granted the right to appoint a mayor. The city's powers were greatly increased in 1451 when Henry VI created the County of the City of Coventry, covering the city itself and a number of surrounding villages. The city's bailiffs acted as sheriffs within the county of the city, making the area a county corporate, administratively independent from Warwickshire.

By the eighteenth century the city corporation had become inadequate to meet the needs of the growing city. A separate body of improvement commissioners was established in 1763 to pave, light and repair the streets, provide a watch, and supply water. Coventry was reformed in 1836 to become a municipal borough under the Municipal Corporations Act 1835, which standardised how many boroughs operated across the country. The city was then governed by a body formally called the "mayor, aldermen and citizens of the city of Coventry", generally known as the corporation or city council. The reformed corporation absorbed the functions of the improvement commissioners later in 1836.

Shortly afterwards questions arose regarding the relationship of the reformed city to the county of the city and to the surrounding county of Warwickshire. These were resolved in 1842 when the county of the city was abolished and the area (including the city itself) was restored to Warwickshire as it had been prior to 1451.

When elected county councils were established in 1889 under the Local Government Act 1888, Coventry was considered large enough to provide its own county-level services, and so it was made a county borough, independent from the new Warwickshire County Council. The county borough was enlarged on several occasions, notably in 1928, 1932 and 1965.

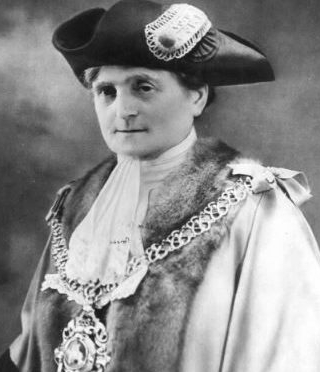
Alice Arnold, wearing Coventry's mayoral regalia

Coventry's first female mayor, appointed in 1937, was Alice Arnold. In 1953 the city's mayor was raised to the status of a lord mayor.

In 1974 the city's boundaries were expanded again when it gained two parishes on its north-western edge (Allesley and Keresley), and was reformed to become a metropolitan borough within the new West Midlands county. From 1974 until 1986 Coventry City Council was a lower-tier authority, with the West Midlands County Council providing county-level services. Following the abolition of the county council in 1986, Coventry took on county-level functions in the area again.

Since 2016 the council has been a constituent member of the West Midlands Combined Authority, which has been led by the directly-elected Mayor of the West Midlands since 2017.

== Governance ==
Coventry City Council provides both county-level and district-level services, with some functions across the West Midlands provided via joint committees with the other West Midlands authorities, overseen by the combined authority and mayor. There are three civil parishes in the city, being Allesley, Finham and Keresley, which form another tier of local government for their areas; the rest of the city is an unparished area.

=== Political control ===
The council had been under no overall control since the 2026 election. Labour are the largest party, and they run the council as a minority administration.

Political control of the council since the 1974 reforms has been as follows:

Party in control	Years
Labour	1974–1977
Conservative	1977–1979
Labour	1979–2003
No overall control	2003–2006
Conservative	2006–2008
No overall control	2008–2010
Labour	2010–2026
No overall control	2026–present

=== Leadership ===
The role of Lord Mayor of Coventry is largely ceremonial, with political leadership provided by the leader of the council. The leaders since 1974 have been:

Councillor	Party	From	To
Arthur Waugh	Labour	1 Apr 1974	May 1977
Gilbert Richards	Conservative	19 May 1977	May 1979
Arthur Waugh	Labour	May 1979	Mar 1983
Peter Lister	Labour	Mar 1983	May 1988
Jim Cunningham	Labour	May 1988	May 1992
Brian Clack	Labour	May 1992	14 Nov 1996
John Fletcher	Labour	Dec 1996	May 2000
Nick Nolan	Labour	May 2000	May 2003
John Mutton	Labour	May 2003	Jun 2004
Ken Taylor	Conservative	2004	May 2010
John Mutton	Labour	20 May 2010	May 2013
Ann Lucas	Labour	16 May 2013	May 2016
George Duggins	Labour	19 May 2016	

=== Composition ===
Following the 2026 Coventry City Council election, the composition of the council was:

Party	Seats
Labour	24
Reform	20
Conservative	6
Green	4
Total	54

The next election is due in 2027.

== Elections ==
Since the last boundary changes took effect in 2026, the council has comprised 54 councillors representing 18 wards, with each ward electing three councillors. Elections are held three years out of every four, with a third of the council (one councillor for each ward) being elected each time for a four-year term of office. Elections for the Mayor of the West Midlands are held in the fourth year of the cycle when there are no city council elections.

== Premises ==
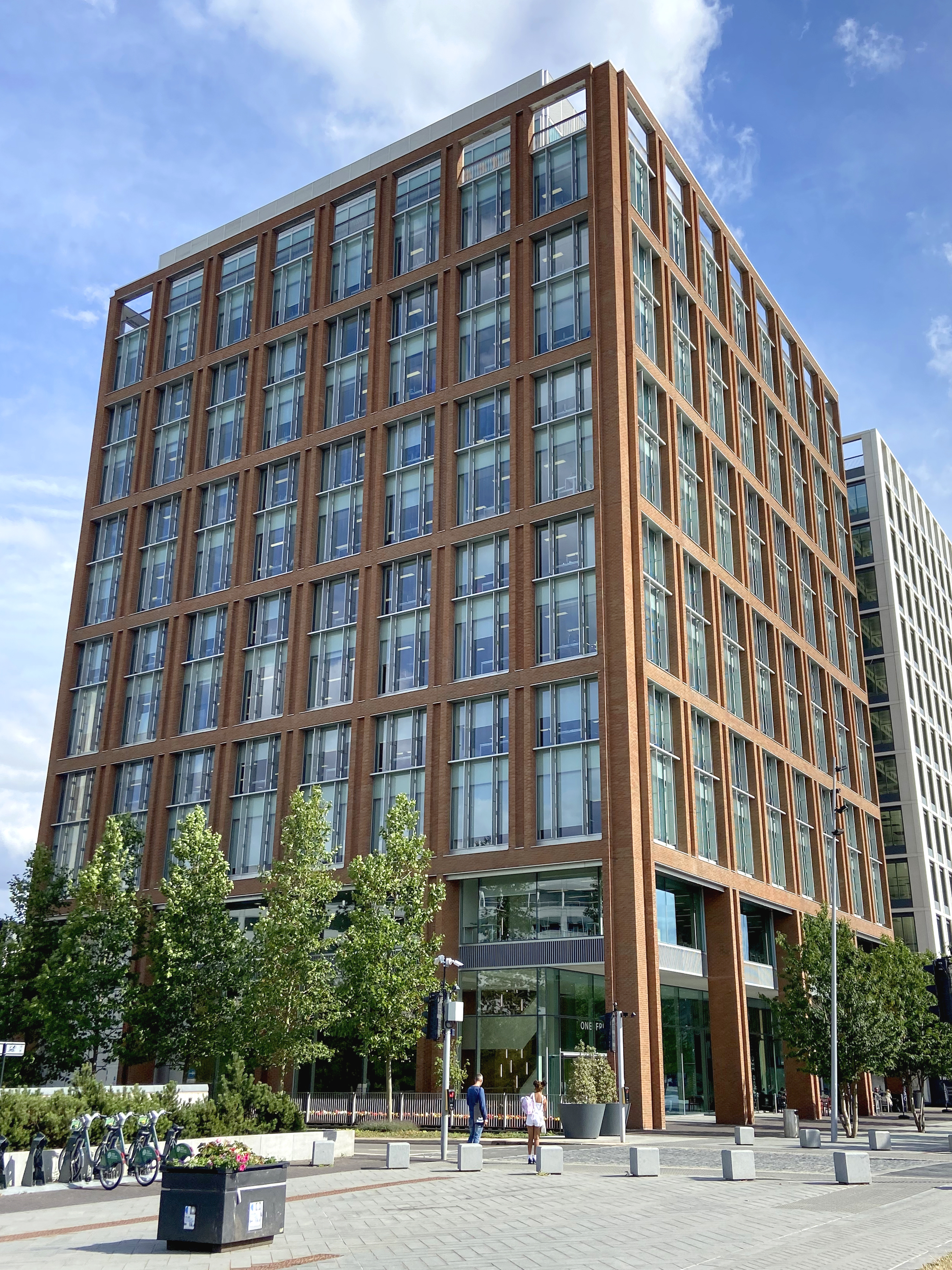
1 Friargate, Coventry, CV1 2GN: Council's main offices.

The council meets at the Council House on Earl Street, which was completed in 1917. In 2017 the council moved its main offices to 1 Friargate, a newly-built office building near Coventry railway station.

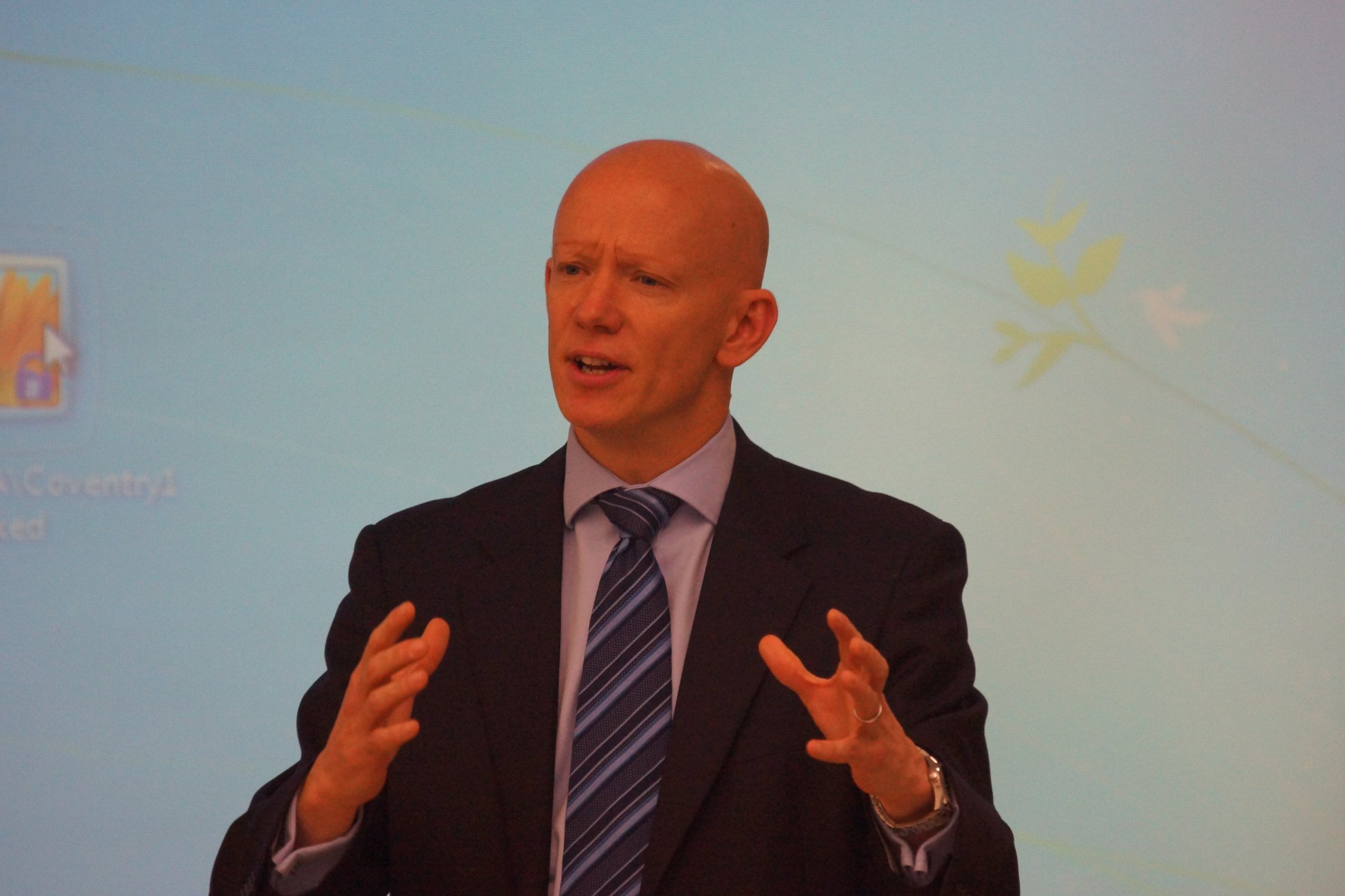
Martin Reeves, Chief Executive 2008–2023, seen on 20 October 2012
