= Zarah Sultana =

British politician (born 1993)

Zarah Sultana MP
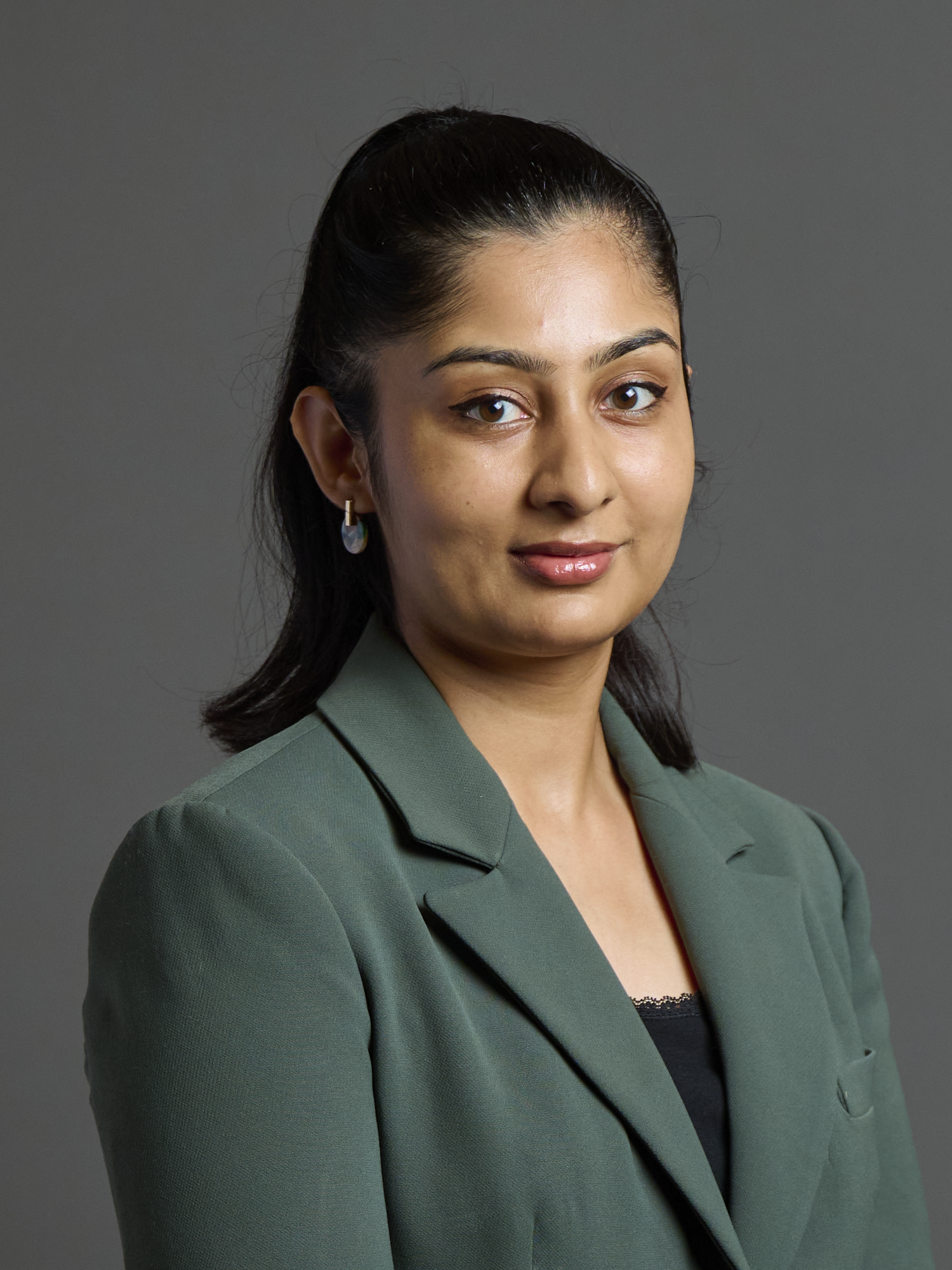
- Official portrait, 2024

Member of Parliament for Coventry South
- Incumbent
- Assumed office 12 December 2019
- Preceded by: Jim Cunningham
- Majority: 10,201 (23.9%)

Chairperson of the Socialist Campaign Group
- In office 6 May 2020 – 28 February 2025
- Preceded by: Lloyd Russell-Moyle and Richard Burgon

Personal details
- Born: 31 October 1993 (age 33) Birmingham, West Midlands, England
- Party: Your Party (since 2025)
- Other political affiliations: Labour Party (2010–2025); Socialist Campaign Group; Independent Alliance (2025)
- Spouse: Craig Lloyd (m. 2024)
- Education: University of Birmingham (BA)
- Website: zarahsultana.com

Zarah Sultana (born 31 October 1993) is a British politician who has served as Member of Parliament (MP) for Coventry South since 2019. She was a Labour Party MP until July 2024 when she had the whip suspended for voting against the government to scrap the two-child benefit cap. She was a member of the Socialist Campaign Group and its chairperson from 2020 to 2025. She resigned her Labour Party membership on 3 July 2025 and co-founded Your Party with the former Labour leader Jeremy Corbyn. Between July and September 2025 she was a member of the Independent Alliance group of MPs. On 18 November 2025, she became Your Party's first MP in the House of Commons.

== Early life and education ==
Zarah Sultana was born in Birmingham on 31 October 1993 to a British Mirpuri family from Pakistan, and was raised with her three sisters in the Lozells area of the city. Her father, an accountant at the University of Central England, and her mother, a homemaker, were Labour Party members. Her grandfather migrated from Thub in Azad Kashmir to Birmingham in the 1960s.

Sultana attended Holte Visual and Performing Arts College, a non-selective community school, before studying at the selective King Edward VI Handsworth Grammar School for sixth form. In an interview in 2024 she said that at the age of 17, during a visit to the West Bank and Jerusalem, she visited a military court. She went on to study international relations with economics at the University of Birmingham from 2012.

Sultana joined the Labour Party in its West Midlands branch in 2011, whilst studying for her A-levels, following the coalition government's decision to treble university tuition fees to £9,000. In her first week of university, she travelled to the West Bank with a delegation of Labour councillors and activists, alongside her father, and subsequently became involved with Students for Justice in Palestine. At Birmingham, Sultana was elected to the National Executive Council of the National Union of Students by 2014, and to the National Committee of Young Labour. While taking a year off from her studies, she led a youth delegation to Bosnia and Herzegovina on behalf of the British charity Remembering Srebrenica in 2014. She completed her degree with first-class honours.

Throughout her studies, Sultana worked retail jobs, including at Primark and H&M. After graduation, she moved to the voluntary sector, where she helped build campaigns against Islamophobia. She was employed as a marketing and engagement officer. She then worked as a community organiser for Labour's Community Organising Unit, established by Jeremy Corbyn as party leader in 2018, in the West Midlands, which later provided her with an electoral platform. By June 2018, she became the parliamentary officer for the group Muslim Engagement and Development.

== Parliamentary career ==
=== 2019 European Parliament election campaign ===
Sultana was listed fifth of seven among the Labour candidates for the 2019 European Parliament election in the West Midlands constituency, meaning that she would be elected if Labour received enough votes in the region to appoint five members of the European Parliament (MEPs). She was not elected, as Labour won only one MEP in the constituency.

=== 2019 general election campaign ===
In October 2019 she was selected as the Labour candidate for Coventry South over Neeraj Patil after the incumbent Labour MP, Jim Cunningham, announced he would not contest the election. Her campaign was backed by Unite the Union (led by Len McCluskey), Momentum, the Fire Brigades Union, the Communication Workers Union and the Bakers, Food and Allied Workers' Union. However, her selection was opposed by some local Constituency Labour Party (CLP) members, who preferred local candidates; one member would tell Jewish News in 2021 that the CLP was "remarkably moderate" in comparison to Sultana. Sultana was elected at the 2019 general election with a majority of 401 votes.

During the 2019 election campaign, the BBC reported that in 2015, whilst a student, Sultana made social media posts from an account she had deleted which implied that she would celebrate the deaths of the former Labour prime minister Tony Blair, Israeli prime minister Benjamin Netanyahu and the former US president George W. Bush, and that she supported "violent resistance" by Palestinians. Sultana apologised for the posts and stated that she no longer held those views and "wrote them out of frustration rather than any malice" as she had felt "exasperated by endless cycles of global suffering, violence and needless killing". Since this, she has attended interfaith conferences and travelled to Auschwitz with an anti-fascist delegation. The Labour Party re-interviewed Sultana following this, and she remained the party's candidate.

After her election, The Jewish Chronicle reported that Sultana made social media posts in 2015 that students who supported Zionism should be "ashamed", as the state of Israel has "over 50 laws discriminating against Palestinians" and it was not "progressive to champion a state created through ethnic cleansing, sustained through occupation, apartheid and war crimes".

=== 2019–2024, Parliament under Labour ===
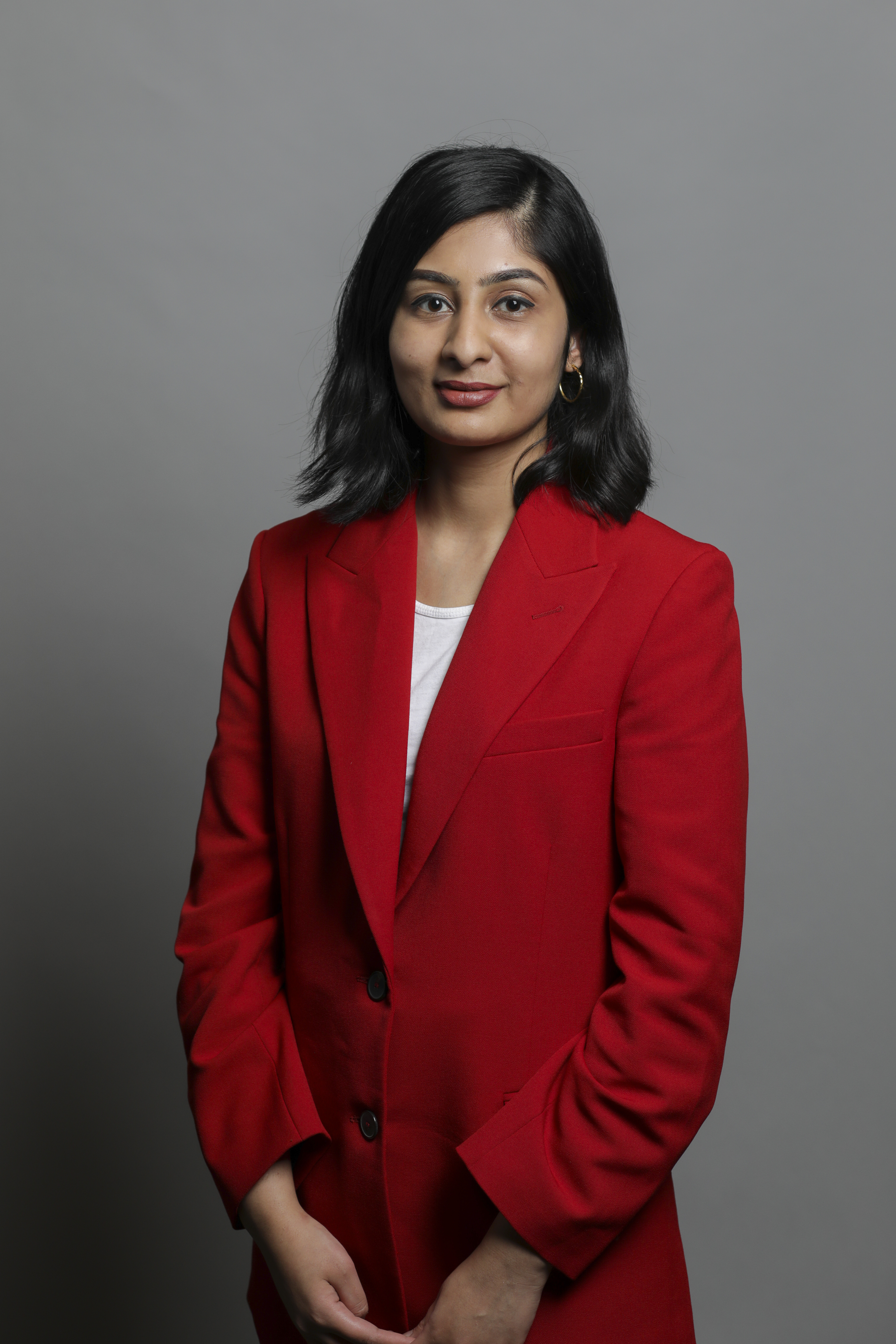
Official portrait, 2019

In her maiden speech, Sultana denounced the policies of "40 years of Thatcherism" in an implicit reference to New Labour, and accused the successive Conservative governments from 2010 onwards of "waging war on working-class communities" and worsening the prospects for the young generation. Shortly after being elected as an MP, Sultana joined the left-wing Socialist Campaign Group and in the 2020 Labour leadership election, nominated Rebecca Long-Bailey for leader and Richard Burgon for deputy leader. In January 2020, Sultana was appointed parliamentary private secretary to Dan Carden, the Shadow Secretary of State for International Development. She was removed from this role by Keir Starmer when he became the party leader in April 2020.

In April 2020, Sultana was among the 35 British MPs who signed the Cuba Solidarity Campaign's letter calling on Foreign Secretary Dominic Raab to demand the suspension of the United States embargo against Cuba, citing Cuba's active role in international aid related to the COVID-19 pandemic. From July 2020 to May 2024, she served as an unpaid trustee of the Albany Theatre in Coventry.

In September 2020, Sultana was one of seven Labour MPs voting in favour of a ten minute rule bill to provide for the recall of Members of the House of Commons who changed their political party affiliation. The Bill ran out of parliamentary time in May 2021 and was not passed. In December 2020 UNICEF announced a £25,000 grant to provide breakfast boxes to vulnerable children in Southwark, London, a move criticised by the Leader of the House of Commons at the time, Jacob Rees-Mogg, as a "political stunt", but defended by Sultana, who reportedly sent him a copy of Charles Dickens's A Christmas Carol in response.

In January 2021, Sultana spoke at the online launch of Jeremy Corbyn and Christine Blower's international non-governmental organisation Peace and Justice Project, alongside Noam Chomsky, Ronnie Kasrils, Len McCluskey and Yanis Varoufakis.

In April 2021, Sultana was profiled by Marie Le Conte for Vogue magazine, along with her Labour colleagues Charlotte Nichols, Taiwo Owatemi, and Sarah Owen. She spoke about the abuse she receives as a Muslim and as a woman of colour, including death threats and being told to 'go back to her own country'. Sultana was described as "one of the most left-wing new Labour MPs" who had "made a name for herself as an outspoken critic of the Government". In September 2021 Sultana broke down in tears during a debate in Parliament recounting the "Islamophobic hate" she had been subject to since being elected.

In May 2021, Sultana joined the advisory council of the Progressive International alongside Corbyn. In the same month, alongside celebrities and other public figures, Sultana was a signatory to an open letter published in Stylist magazine which called on the government to address what it described as an "epidemic of male violence" by funding an "ongoing, high-profile, expert-informed awareness campaign on men's violence against women and girls".

In September 2021 Sultana chaired the Fire Brigade Union's Climate Catastrophe: The Case for a Socialist Green New Deal fringe event at the Labour Party conference. In October 2021 she joined cross-party MPs including Caroline Lucas and Clive Lewis to launch the Green New Deal Bill in Parliament, "a game-changing plan to stop climate change and build a world in which we can thrive", which she described in a LabourList article as having "social justice at its heart, putting the interests of the many ahead of the greed of the few."

In November 2021, she launched the private limited company Zarah Sultana Campaigns, which acts as the data controller for her mailing list.

On 24 February 2022, following the 2022 Russian invasion of Ukraine, Sultana was one of 11 Labour MPs threatened with losing the party whip after they signed a statement by the Stop the War Coalition which questioned the legitimacy of NATO and accused the alliance of "eastward expansion". All 11 MPs subsequently removed their signatures. After receiving a death threat, she criticised what she described as "inaccurate" reports by the media for creating "an active danger to the safety of public figures, and threaten[ing] to narrow our democracy". In a statement to The Guardian she said she "unequivocally condemned" the actions of the Russian government in Ukraine. She also criticised an anonymous Labour source who described the 11 MPs as a "mouthpiece for the Kremlin", and said that she had complained to the party chair, Anneliese Dodds, about party sources disseminating "dangerous and irresponsible messages".

In March 2022 Sultana pledged to donate her upcoming £2,212 pay rise to Coventry Foodbank and local charities in the city "supporting refugees, to help Ukrainians and all those fleeing brutal war". She also organised a crowdfunding campaign for Coventry Foodbank which raised £10,000, which equated to over five tonnes of food. She delivered a speech in Parliament on the cost-of-living crisis in May 2022. A backbencher, she was credited at the time with the largest social media audience among MPs on TikTok (315,000 followers) and Twitter (252,000), and the third-largest on Instagram (205,000).

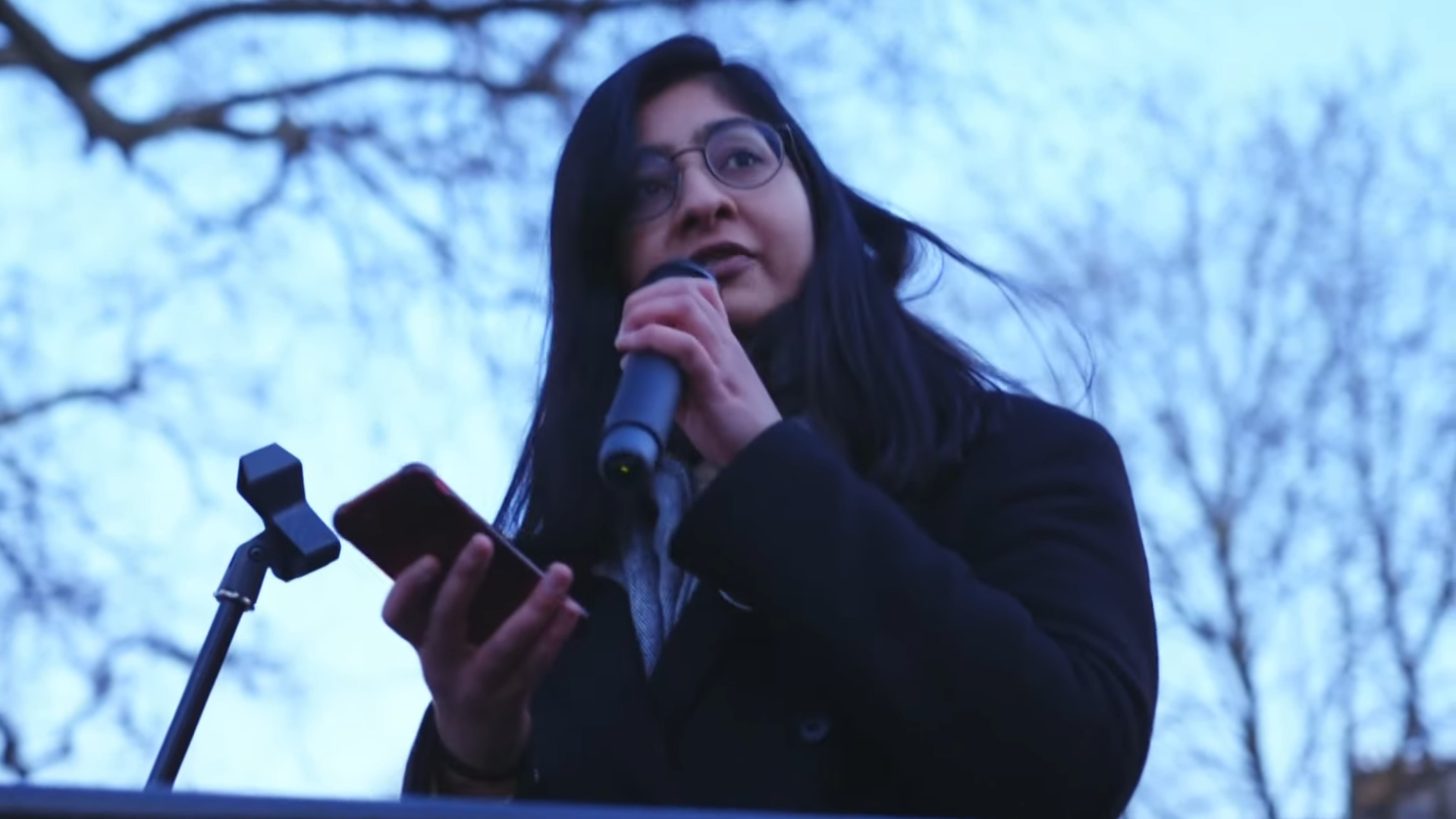
Sultana addressing striking nurses in London, January 2023

In October 2022 Sultana was re-selected as the Labour Party MP for her constituency, after receiving 90% of the vote from six local branches of the party and support from all participating affiliate organisations. At the end of the month, she travelled to Brazil with the support of the Progressive International to observe the second round of the country's presidential elections. In November 2022 she addressed the picket line during the University and College Union (UCU) strikes on the University of Warwick campus. In December 2022, when over 2,000 firefighters and control staff attended a rally in Westminster to protest low pay, Sultana addressed the crowd alongside Jeremy Corbyn and Matt Wrack. In 2023 she opposed the Strike (Minimum Service Levels) Bill and was chair of the Fire Brigades Union parliamentary group.

During the Israeli invasion of the Gaza Strip, she developed a significant media presence commenting on the situation in Gaza and criticising UK arms exports to Israel. During this time, she has become the MP receiving the most death threats and online abuse.

=== 2024–present, independent and Your Party ===
At the 2024 general election she was returned and increased her majority from 401 to over 10,000, receiving 20,361 votes.

On 23 July 2024 Sultana, along with six other Labour MPs, had the Labour party whip withdrawn for voting against the government and in favour of a Scottish National Party amendment to end the two-child benefit cap. She said that "I have to stand up for what I believe are the true values of the Labour Party and in doing so I've made difficult decisions in terms of defying the whip." Although the suspensions were initially said to be for six months, Sultana (along with John McDonnell and Apsana Begum) had still not had the whip restored by the time of her resignation from the party in July 2025. In September 2024 Sultana voted against the Labour government and in favour of a motion to block the proposed cut in Winter Fuel Payment. In December 2024, Sultana declared her support for the WASPI women campaign.

In June 2025, Sultana voted against the Assisted Dying Bill, which would have allowed some terminally ill adults to get medical help in ending their lives. On 2 July 2025 she spoke in Parliament against the proscription of Palestine Action as a terrorist group. The UK parliament redacted her statement that "We are all Palestine Action" from Hansard. The statement appears in the video of the debate.

Around the spring of 2025, Sultana and her husband joined the Collective group's informal organising committee to take part in negotiations over the launch of a new national party on the political left. On 3 July 2025, after Andrew Feinstein's motion to invite Sultana to leave Labour and take up the position of "interim co-leader" in the proposed new party was controversially passed at an online meeting of the organising committee (contrary to the wishes of Jeremy Corbyn and his allies), Sultana resigned her Labour Party membership and announced that same evening she would be joining Corbyn, who had previously led the Labour Party, in forming and leading a new left-wing political party. Corbyn was reported to be "bewildered" due to not having been consulted about the announcement; a source close to Corbyn said that a new party, or movement, was on the cards, but Sultana had "jumped the gun". However, on his own social media, Corbyn said that "discussions were ongoing" and expressed his delight that "[Sultana] will help us build a real alternative [to current political parties]".

On 24 July 2025 Sultana and Corbyn jointly launched a new party, known by the provisional name Your Party, and Sultana joined the Independent Alliance. It was reported that Sultana would contest Lord Chancellor Shabana Mahmood's seat in the Birmingham Ladywood constituency for Your Party in the next general election. In an August 2025 interview with Oliver Eagleton in the New Left Review, she said that Corbynism had "capitulated to the IHRA definition of antisemitism, which famously equates it with anti-Zionism". On X, she later clarified: "I say it loudly and proudly: I'm an anti-Zionist".

In late October 2025, against the background of a row with fellow Independent Alliance-affiliated directors of Your Party over the control of money raised through supporters' donations and her unilateral membership launch in September, Sultana took over the directorship of MoU Operations Ltd, the company in charge of the funds, from Jamie Driscoll, Andrew Feinstein and Beth Winter.

In November 2025, it was reported that she had "voluntarily left the Independent Alliance and the Your Party stewarding group" on 18 September 2025, the date that she launched the first Your Party membership portal. She has said that she was "excluded". On 18 November 2025, she became Your Party's first MP in the House of Commons.

In February 2026, following the arrest of Andrew Mountbatten-Windsor on suspicion of misconduct in public office, Sultana called for the abolition of the monarchy, a position she has held since at least November 2025.

In April 2026 she was named for refusing to leave the chamber after being ordered to do so by the speaker, Lindsay Hoyle. Hoyle had asked her to leave the House of Commons after she called Starmer a "bare-faced liar" for stating he was unaware that Peter Mandelson had failed a security vetting at the time he appointed Mandelson US ambassador. Lee Anderson was expelled from the same session after he also called Starmer a liar in relation to Starmer's statement about his appointment of Mandelson.

== Recognition ==
In March 2022 Sultana received an MP of the Year Award from the Patchwork Foundation, celebrating her work championing "underrepresented and disadvantaged communities across the UK." She also presented the Campaigner of the Year award at the PinkNews Awards to Nemat Sadat, an Afghan-American queer activist and novelist.

Also in 2022, a photograph of Sultana featured in the Creative Connections Coventry exhibition at the Herbert Art Gallery and Museum in Coventry, which celebrated cultural and political figures with connections to the city. In 2023 she was nominated for a "Backbencher of the Year" award by the public relations firm Pagefield, and shortly afterwards she received a "Coventry Legends Award" by Coventry United Women's Football Club in recognition of her work "as a committed champion of Coventry" and "for being an amazing female role model."

In May 2023 Sultana was ranked 47th on the New Statesman's "left power list", which described her as a "rare" "genuinely viral politician". She says social media is "really effective in reaching out to newer audiences, younger audiences and getting out political messages".

== Personal life ==
Sultana is married to a policy officer for the Fire Brigades Union. Sultana is a practising Muslim. At the time of her election as an MP in 2019, she lived in Earlsdon, a suburb of Coventry. Sultana supports Liverpool F.C.

Parliament of the United Kingdom
Preceded by Jim Cunningham	Member of Parliament for Coventry South; 2019–present
