= Tribune (magazine) =

British socialist magazine

- Format: Quarterly magazine and website
- Publisher: Tribune Media Group
- Editor: Oliver Eagleton
- Founded: 1937
- Political alignment: Democratic socialism
- Headquarters: 428–432 Ley Street, London, IG2 7BS
- Circulation: 15,000
- ISSN: 0041-2821
- Website: tribunemag.co.uk

Tribune is a democratic socialist political magazine founded in 1937 and published in London, initially as a daily newspaper, then converted to a magazine in 2001. While it is independent, it has usually supported the Labour Party from the left. Previous editors at the magazine have included Aneurin Bevan, the minister of health who spearheaded the establishment of the National Health Service, former Labour leader Michael Foot, and writer George Orwell, who served as literary editor.

From 2008 it faced serious financial difficulties until it was purchased by Jacobin in late 2018, shifting to a quarterly publication model. Since its relaunch the number of paying subscribers has passed 15,000, with columns from high-profile socialist politicians such as former leader of the Labour Party Jeremy Corbyn, former Second Deputy Prime Minister of Spain Pablo Iglesias and former Bolivian President Evo Morales. In January 2020, it was used as the platform on which Rebecca Long-Bailey chose to launch her Labour leadership campaign.

== History ==
=== Origins ===
Tribune was founded in early 1937 by two wealthy left-wing Labour Party Members of Parliament (MPs), Sir Stafford Cripps and George Strauss, to back the Unity Campaign, an attempt to secure an anti-fascist and anti-appeasement united front between the Labour Party and socialist parties to the left. The latter included Cripps's (Labour-affiliated) Socialist League, the Independent Labour Party (ILP) and the Communist Party of Great Britain (CPGB).

The paper's first editor was William Mellor. Among its journalists were Michael Foot and Barbara Betts (later Barbara Castle), while the board included the Labour MPs Aneurin Bevan and Ellen Wilkinson, Harold Laski of the Left Book Club, and the veteran left-wing journalist and former ILP member H. N. Brailsford.

Mellor was fired in 1938 for refusing to adopt a new CPGB policy – supported by Cripps – of backing a popular front, including non-socialist parties, against fascism and appeasement; Foot resigned in solidarity. Mellor was succeeded by H. J. Hartshorn, a secret member of the CPGB. Meanwhile, Victor Gollancz, the Left Book Club's publisher, joined the board of directors. For the next year, the paper was little more than an appendage of the Left Book Club, taking an uncritical line on the Popular Front and the Soviet Union.

=== 1940s ===
With the Molotov–Ribbentrop Pact and the outbreak of the Second World War in 1939, Tribune initially adopted the CPGB's position of denouncing the British and French declarations of war on Germany as imperialist. After the Soviet invasion of Finland, with Cripps off on a world tour, Strauss and Bevan became increasingly impatient with Hartshorn's unrelenting Stalinism. Strauss fired Hartshorn in February 1940, replacing him as editor with Raymond Postgate. Under Postgate's editorship, the Soviet fellow travellers at Tribune were either dismissed, or in Postgate's words, "left soon after in dislike of me". From then on, the paper became the voice of the pro-war democratic left in the Labour Party, taking a position similar to that adopted by Gollancz in the volume Betrayal of the Left he edited attacking the communists for backing the Nazi-Soviet pact.

Early 1941 Tribune flier

Bevan ousted Postgate after a series of personality clashes in 1941, assuming the role of editor himself, although the day-to-day running of the paper was done by Jon Kimche. The Tribune campaigned vigorously for the opening of a second front against Adolf Hitler's Germany, was consistently critical of the Winston Churchill government's failings, and argued that only a democratic socialist post-war settlement in Britain and Europe as a whole was viable.

George Orwell was hired in 1943 as literary editor. In this role, as well as commissioning and writing reviews, he wrote a series of columns, most of them under the title "As I Please", that have become touchstones of the opinion journalist's craft. Orwell left the Tribune staff in early 1945 to become a war correspondent for The Observer, to be replaced as literary editor by his friend Tosco Fyvel, but he remained a regular contributor until March 1947.

Orwell's most famous contributions to Tribune as a columnist include "You and the Atom Bomb", "The sporting spirit", "Books v cigarettes", "Decline of the English Murder", and "Some Thoughts on the Common Toad", all of which have since appeared in dozens of anthologies.

Other writers who contributed to Tribune in the 1940s include Naomi Mitchison, Stevie Smith, Alex Comfort, Arthur Calder-Marshall, Julian Symons, Elizabeth Taylor, Rhys Davies, Daniel George, Inez Holden, and Phyllis Shand Allfrey.

Kimche left Tribune to join Reuters in 1945, his place being taken by Frederic Mullally. After the Labour landslide election victory of 1945, Bevan joined Clement Attlee's government and formally left the paper, leaving Mullally and Evelyn Anderson as joint editors, with Foot playing Bevan's role of political director. Over the next five years, Tribune was critically involved in every key political event in the life of the Labour government and reached its highest-ever circulation, of some 40,000. Foot persuaded Kimche to return as joint editor in 1946 (after Mullally's departure to the Sunday Pictorial) and in 1948 himself became joint editor with Anderson, after Kimche was fired for disappearing from the office to travel to Istanbul to negotiate the safe passage of two Jewish refugee ships through the Bosphorus and Dardanelles.

In the first few years of the Attlee administration, Tribune became the focus for the Labour left's attempts to persuade Ernest Bevin, the Foreign Secretary, to adopt a "third force" democratic socialist foreign policy, with Europe acting independently from the United States and the Soviet Union, most coherently advanced in the pamphlet Keep Left (which was published by the rival New Statesman).

Following the Soviet rejection of Marshall Aid and the communist takeover of Czechoslovakia in 1948, Tribune endorsed the North Atlantic Treaty Organization and took a strongly anti-communist line, with its editor declaring in November 1948: "The major threat to democratic socialism and the major danger of war in Europe arises from Soviet policy and not from American policy. It is not the Americans who have imposed a blockade on Berlin. It is not the Americans who have used conspiratorial methods to destroy democratic socialist parties in one country after another. It is not the Americans who have blocked effective action through one United Nations agency after another".

=== Bevanism and the Campaign for Nuclear Disarmament ===
Foot remained in the editorial chair until 1952 when Bob Edwards took over, but he returned after losing his parliamentary seat in Plymouth in 1955. During the early 1950s, Tribune became the organ of the Bevanite left opposition to the Labour Party leadership, turning against the United States over its handling of the Korean War, then arguing strongly against West German rearmament and nuclear arms. However, Tribune remained critical of the Soviet Union as it denounced Stalin on his death in 1953 and in 1956 opposed the Soviet suppression of the Hungarian Revolution and also the British government's Suez "adventure". The paper and Bevan parted company after his "naked into the conference chamber" speech at the 1957 Labour Party conference. For the next five years, Tribune was at the forefront of the campaign to commit Labour to a non-nuclear defence policy, "the official weekly of the Campaign for Nuclear Disarmament" (CND) as the direct actionists in the peace movement put it. CND's general secretary Peggy Duff had been Tribune general manager. Among journalists on Tribune in the 1950s were Richard Clements, Ian Aitken and Mervyn Jones, who related his experience on the paper in his autobiography Chances.

=== 1960s and 1970s ===
After Foot was re-elected to Parliament in 1960 for Bevan's old seat of Ebbw Vale, Richard Clements became editor. During the 1960s and 1970s the paper faithfully expressed the ideas of the parliamentary Labour left and allied itself with the new generation of left-wing trade union leaders that emerged on the back of a wave of workplace militancy from the early 1960s onwards.

As such, it played a massive role in the politics of the time. Although it welcomed the election of Harold Wilson's Labour government in 1964—"Tribune takes over from Eton in the cabinet", exclaimed a headline—the paper became rapidly disillusioned. It denounced the Wilson government's timidity on nationalisation and devaluation, opposed its moves to join the European Communities (EC) and attacked it for failing to take a principled position against the Vietnam War. It also backed the unions' campaigns against the government's prices-and-incomes policies and against In Place of Strife, Barbara Castle's 1969 package of trade union law reforms.

The paper continued in the same vein after Edward Heath won the 1970 general election, opposing his Tory government's trade union legislation between 1970 and 1974 and placing itself at the head of opposition to Heath's negotiations for Britain to join the EEC. After Labour regained power in 1974, Tribune played a central part in the "no" campaign in the 1975 referendum on British EEC membership.

However, Tribune in this period did not speak to, let alone represent, the concerns of the younger generation of leftists who were at the centre of the campaign against the Vietnam War and the post-1968 student revolt, who found the paper's reformism and commitment to Labour tame and old-fashioned. Circulation, around 20,000 in 1960, was said by 1980 to be around 10,000, but it was in fact much less.

=== Brief support of Tony Benn ===
Clements resigned as editor in 1982 to become a political adviser to Foot (by now Labour leader), a role he continued under Foot's successor as Labour leader, Neil Kinnock. Clements was succeeded in the Tribune chair by Chris Mullin, who steered the paper into supporting Tony Benn (then just past the peak of his influence on the Labour left) and attempted to turn it into a friendly society in which readers were invited to buy shares, much to the consternation of the old Bevanite shareholders, most prominent among them John Silkin and Donald Bruce, who attempted unsuccessfully to take control of the paper. A protracted dispute ensued that at one point seemed likely to close the paper.

=== Paper of the soft left ===
Mullin left in 1984, with circulation at around 6,000, a level it roughly remained for the next ten years. He was replaced by his equally Bennite protege Nigel Williamson, who surprised everyone by arguing for a realignment of the left and took the paper into the soft left camp, supporting Kinnock, a long-time Tribune contributor and onetime board member, as Labour leader against the Bennites. The next two editors Phil Kelly and Paul Anderson took much the same line, although both clashed with Kinnock, particularly over his decision to abandon Labour's non-nuclear defence policy.

Under Kelly, Tribune supported John Prescott's challenge to Roy Hattersley as Labour Deputy leader in 1988 and came close to going bust, a fate averted by an emergency appeal launched by a front page exclaiming "Don't let this be the last issue of Tribune". Under Anderson, the paper took a strongly pro-European stance, supported electoral reform and argued for military intervention against Serbian aggression in Croatia and Bosnia. Throughout the 1980s and early 1990s, Tribune acted as a clearing house for arguments inside the Labour Party, with contributions from all major players.

=== Back to basics ===
From 1993, Mark Seddon shifted Tribune several degrees back to the left, particularly after Tony Blair became Labour leader in 1994. The paper strongly opposed Blair's abandonment of Clause IV of the Labour Party constitution and resisted his rebranding of the party as New Labour.

After Labour won the 1997 general election, the paper maintained an oppositionist stance, objecting to the Blair government's military interventions and its reliance on spin-doctors. In 2001, Tribune opposed the United States-led invasion of Afghanistan and it was outspoken against the invasion of Iraq in 2003. The paper under Seddon also reverted to an anti-European position very similar to that it adopted in the 1970s and early 1980s and campaigned for Gordon Brown to replace Blair as Labour leader and prime minister.

Tribune changed format from newspaper to magazine in April 2001, but remained plagued by financial uncertainty, coming close to folding again in 2002. However, Seddon and the chairman of Tribune Publications, Labour MP Peter Kilfoyle, led a team of pro-bono advisers who organised a rescue package with a consortium of trade unions (Unison, Amicus, Aslef, Communication Workers Union, Community, T&GWU), who became majority shareholders in return for a significant investment in the magazine in early 2004.

Whilst Tribune editor, Seddon was elected several times to the Labour Party National Executive Committee as a candidate of the Grassroots Alliance coalition of left-wing activists. He resigned as editor in summer 2004 and was succeeded by Chris McLaughlin, former political editor of the Sunday Mirror.

During 2007, Tribune spawned two offshoot websites: a Tribune Cartoons blog, put together by cartoonists who draw for the magazine; and a Tribune History blog.

In September 2008, the magazine's future was again in doubt thanks to problems with its trade union funding. An attempt by the Unite trade union to render Tribune its wholly owned subsidiary had a mixed response, but on 9 October it was announced that the magazine would close on 31 October if a buyer could not be found. The uncertainty continued until early December 2008, when it emerged that a 51% stake was being sold to an unnamed Labour Party activist for £1, with an undertaking to support the magazine for £40,000 per annum, and with debts written off by the trade union now-former owners.

Tribune's cartoonists were Alex Hughes, Matthew Buck, Jon Jensen, Martin Rowson and Gary Barker.

=== Changes of ownership (2009–2018) ===
In March 2009, 100% ownership of the magazine passed to Kevin McGrath through a new company, Tribune Publications 2009 Limited, with the intention of keeping Tribune a left-of-centre publication, though broadening the readership.

In late October 2011, the future of Tribune looked bleak once again when McGrath warned of possible closure because subscriptions and income had not risen as had been hoped. Unless a buyer could be found or a cooperative established, the last edition would have been published on 4 November. McGrath committed to paying off the magazine's debts. Another rescue plan saved the magazine at the end of October. In 2013, Tribune claimed a circulation of 5,000.

In the autumn of 2016, the journal was owned by the businessman Owen Oyston, who acquired its parent company London Publications Ltd. Oyston filed for bankruptcy and ceased to publish Tribune in January 2018.

=== Relaunch (2018–present) ===
In May 2018, it was announced that the Tribune IP had been sold to the American socialist magazine Jacobin. In August 2018, Jacobin publisher Bhaskar Sunkara confirmed the purchase of Tribune in media reports, stating that he aimed to relaunch the magazine ahead of the Labour Party Conference in September. At the official re-launch in September 2018, Tribune was announced as a bimonthly magazine, reduced from weekly, with a high-quality design, concentrating on longer-form political analysis and industrial issues coverage, thus differentiating Tribune from other UK leftist media outlets such as Novara Media and the Morning Star. Some of the existing staff were made redundant. Tribune had 2,000 subscribers, with an aim of reaching 10,000 within a year. The magazine is currently published quarterly. In December 2020, the magazine's editor announced it had 15,000 subscribers.

Tribune often represents the views of Labour-aligned left, most notably for being the publication chosen to launch Rebecca Long-Bailey's leadership campaign. High-profile writers for the publication include former leader of the Labour Party Jeremy Corbyn, and other members of the Socialist Campaign Group of Labour MPs such as Lloyd Russell-Moyle. Issues have contained interviews with international socialist politicians such as Deputy Prime Minister of Spain Pablo Iglesias and former Bolivian President Evo Morales.

In February 2021, in an interview on Novara Media, editor Ronan Burtenshaw announced that Tribune was being sued in a libel case. Though he did not comment on the nature of the case, he commented: "It is not a case that has any substance, we are going to fight it and I think we are going to win it. I can't say anymore, I am legally restricted from saying any more about it, it's not related to the Labour Party before anybody goes on that tangent".

In 2025, Mohamed Ali Harrath, owner of the Islam Channel, purchased the magazine. An editorial advisory board was established including Jacobin founder Bhaskar Sunkara, the previous owner, and chaired by Labour MP Jon Trickett.

Tribune organised a conference in November 2026 titled "Washington's global reign of terror and Britain's role in reinforcing it". Swedish journalist and academic Andreas Malm, who had previously expressed support for the Palestinian right to armed resistance, was one of the intended speakers, but his electronic travel authorisation was cancelled and he was informed by the Home Office that he could not travel to the UK because his presence would not be "conducive to the public good". Tribune editor Oliver Eagleton, said "He is being censored for speaking out about censorship, in truly Orwellian fashion. It is shameful that Andy Burnham’s government is continuing the authoritarian overreach we saw under Keir Starmer, and in this dystopian new reality it is now commonplace in Britain for authors and academics to be treated as terrorists because they support Palestinians facing genocide and the rights of people protesting that genocide." Another speaker was Huda Ammori, one of the founders of Palestine Action, a group officially designated as a terrorist organisation by the UK government in 2025.

== Connections to the Labour Party ==
=== Labour Party Conference ===
The magazine has historically hosted panels and rallies- or fringe events- at Labour Party Conference. In 2021 they invited Labour Party MP and SCG member Andy McDonald and US politician and organiser Nina Turner.

=== Tribune Group of MPs ===
The Tribune Group of Labour MPs was formed as a support group for the newspaper in 1964. During the 1960s and 1970s it was the main forum for the left in the Parliamentary Labour Party, but it split over Tony Benn's bid for the deputy leadership of the party in 1981, with Benn's supporters forming the Campaign Group (later the Socialist Campaign Group). During the 1980s the Tribune Group was the Labour soft left's political caucus, but its closeness to the leadership of Neil Kinnock meant that it had lost any real raison d'etre by the early 1990s. It ceased to promote a list of candidates for shadow cabinet elections.

The group was reformed in 2005, led by Clive Efford, MP for Eltham. Invitations to join the newly reformed group were extended to backbench Labour MPs only. The group, which included former cabinet minister Yvette Cooper and former Labour policy coordinator Jon Cruddas, relaunched themselves in April 2017 aiming to reconnect with traditional Labour voters while also appealing to the centre ground. They supported "opportunity and aspiration" being central to the party's programme, with policies supporting the "security of its people at its heart". While not critical of then-leader Jeremy Corbyn, it was considered as a group of centre-left and moderate Labour MPs who would resist a left-wing successor being selected. The group has no connection with the current incarnation of the magazine. In 2018 it listed more than 70 MPs as members.

The group launched a new website in 2021, listing 78 MPs as members including Labour leader Keir Starmer. By 2025, analysis by LabourList and PLMR suggested the group had 60 MPs.

In November 2025, a new group was elected to revive the caucus led by former Secretary of State for Transport Louise Haigh, former whip Vicky Foxcroft, Justin Madders, Sarah Owen, Yuan Yang and Beccy Cooper. In 2026, The Guardian listed the Tribune Group as one of the four major groups influencing the economic policy of leadership contenders in the 2026 Labour Party leadership crisis.

== Content ==
Aside from its online articles and quarterly newspaper, Tribune has other content and operations.

=== A World to Win podcast ===
On 19 August 2020, Tribune launched the podcast A World to Win alongside economist Grace Blakeley and with funding from The Lipman-Miliband Trust. Notable guests on the podcast include Jeremy Corbyn, Sinn Féin leader Mary Lou McDonald, philosopher and activist Cornel West, and academic and author Naomi Klein.

== List of editors ==
1. William Mellor (1937–1938)
2. H. J. Hartshorn (1938–1940)
3. Raymond Postgate (1940–1941)
4. Aneurin Bevan and Jon Kimche (1941–1945)
5. Frederic Mullally and Evelyn Anderson (1945–1946)
6. Jon Kimche and Evelyn Anderson (1946–1948)
7. Michael Foot and Evelyn Anderson (1948–1952)
8. Bob Edwards (1952–1955)
9. Michael Foot (1955–1960)
10. Richard Clements (1960–1982)
11. Chris Mullin (1982–1984)
12. Nigel Williamson (1984–1987)
13. Phil Kelly (1987–1991)
14. Paul Anderson (1991–1993)
15. Mark Seddon (1993–2004)
16. Chris McLaughlin (2004–2018)
17. Ronan Burtenshaw (2018–2023)
18. Taj Ali and Karl Hansen (2023–2024)
19. Karl Hansen (2024–2025)
20. Alex Niven (2025–2026)
21. Oliver Eagleton (2026-current)

== List of staff writers ==
Past

- George Orwell (literary editor)
- Owen Hatherley (culture editor)

Current

- Grace Blakeley
