= Elaine Burton, Baroness Burton of Coventry =

The Right Honourable The Baroness Burton of Coventry
- Burton in 1962

Member of the House of Lords Lord Temporal
- In office 12 April 1962 – 6 October 1991; Life Peerage

Member of Parliament for Coventry South
- In office 23 February 1950 – 7 October 1959
- Preceded by: New constituency
- Succeeded by: Philip Hocking

Personal details
- Born: Elaine Frances Burton; 2 March 1904 Scarborough, Yorkshire, England
- Died: 6 October 1991 (aged 87) Westminster, England
- Party: Common Wealth (1943–44); Labour (1944–81); SDP (1981–88) 'Continuing' SDP (1988–90)

Elaine Frances Burton, Baroness Burton of Coventry (2 March 1904 – 6 October 1991) was a politician in the United Kingdom.

== Career ==
Burton stood twice to become a Member of Parliament, before being elected on her third candidacy. She lost as a Common Wealth Party candidate in the 1943 Hartlepool by-election, before switching to the Labour Party and losing as a candidate in Hendon South in the 1945 general election. In the 1950 general election, she was elected for the newly created constituency of Coventry South, holding the seat until 1959, when it was gained by the Conservative candidate Philip Hocking.

Burton was elevated to the peerage in April 1962 as Baroness Burton of Coventry, of Coventry in the County of Warwick, where she spoke on topics including women's opportunities in business and public life, and campaigned for the creation of an independent grant-supported body for sport, leading to her appointment to the newly formed Sports Council in 1965. She was also appointed to the Independent Television Authority between 1964 and 1969.

In March 1981 Burton was one of nine Labour peers who left the party to join the newly formed Social Democratic Party (SDP). She became their spokesman in the Lords on civil aviation and consumer affairs. Like most other SDP peers, she objected to her party's merger with the Liberal Party in 1988 to become the Liberal Democrats, and became a member of David Owen's 'continuing' SDP until its dissolution in 1990. Thereafter she sat as non-affiliated until her death.

== Notes ==
Parliament of the United Kingdom
New constituency	Member of Parliament for Coventry South; 1950–1959	Succeeded by Philip Hocking
