= Coventry South East =

UK Parliament constituency (1974–1997)

- Former borough constituency for the House of Commons
- County: West Midlands

February 1974–1997
- Seats: One
- Created from: Coventry South, Coventry East
- Replaced by: Coventry South, Coventry North East

Coventry South East was a parliamentary constituency in the city of Coventry. It returned one Member of Parliament (MP) to the House of Commons of the Parliament of the United Kingdom.

The constituency was created for the February 1974 general election, and abolished for the 1997 general election.

== Boundaries ==
1974–1983: The County Borough of Coventry wards of Binley and Willenhall, Godiva, Lower Stoke, and St Michael's.

1983–1997: The City of Coventry wards of Binley and Willenhall, Cheylesmore, Lower Stoke, and St Michael's.

For its entire existence the constituency included Coventry city centre, which had previously been part of the Coventry South seat; in 1997 the city centre was transferred to the re-created Coventry South constituency, with Jim Cunningham being elected as MP.

== Members of Parliament ==
Election	Member	Party
Feb 1974	Bill Wilson	Labour
1983	Dave Nellist	Labour
1991	Dave Nellist	Independent
1992	Jim Cunningham	Labour
1997	constituency abolished: see Coventry South & Coventry North East	

== Elections ==
=== Elections in the 1970s ===
General election February 1974: Coventry South East
Party	Candidate	Votes	%	±%
Labour	William Wilson	22,217	58.23	
Conservative	Ian Taylor	11,466	30.05	
Liberal	Dhani Prem	4,472	11.72	
Majority		10,751	28.18	
Turnout		38,155	75.53	
Labour win (new seat)				

General election October 1974: Coventry South East
Party	Candidate	Votes	%	±%
Labour	William Wilson	20,771	60.45	+2.22
Conservative	C Hannington	8,640	25.14	—4.91
Liberal	D Woodcock	4,952	14.41	+2.69
Majority		12,131	35.31	+7.13
Turnout		46,494	67.62	—7.91
Labour hold		Swing	+3.56	

General election 1979: Coventry South East
Party	Candidate	Votes	%	±%
Labour	William Wilson	19,583	55.00	—5.45
Conservative	T Sawdon	12,097	33.98	+8.84
Liberal	M Brazier	2,984	8.38	—6.03
National Front	R Clarke	513	1.44	New
Workers Revolutionary	A Wilkins	426	1.20	New
Majority		7,486	21.02	—14.29
Turnout		35,603	69.86	+2.24
Labour hold		Swing	—7.15	

=== Elections in the 1980s ===
General election 1983: Coventry South East
Party	Candidate	Votes	%	±%
Labour	Dave Nellist	15,307	41.1	―13.9
Conservative	Jacques Arnold	12,625	33.9	―0.1
Liberal	Gordon Kilby	9,323	25.0	+15.6
Majority		2,682	7.2	―13.8
Turnout		37,255	70.9	+1.0
Labour hold		Swing		

General election 1987: Coventry South East
Party	Candidate	Votes	%	±%
Labour	Dave Nellist	17,969	47.5	+6.4
Conservative	Alan Grant	11,316	29.9	―4.0
SDP	Frank Devine	8,095	21.4	―3.6
Green	Neil Hutchinson	479	1.3	New
Majority		6,653	17.6	+10.4
Turnout		37,856	73.0	+2.1
Labour hold		Swing		

=== Elections in the 1990s ===
General election 1992: Coventry South East
Party	Candidate	Votes	%	±%
Labour	Jim Cunningham	11,902	32.6	―14.9
Conservative	Martine Hyams	10,591	29.0	―0.9
Independent Labour	Dave Nellist	10,551	28.9	New
Liberal Democrats	Tony Armstrong	3,318	9.1	―12.3
National Front	Norman Tomkinson	173	0.4	New
Majority		1,311	3.6	―14.0
Turnout		36,535	74.9	+1.9
Labour hold		Swing		
