= Jim Cunningham (politician) =

British politician (born 1941)

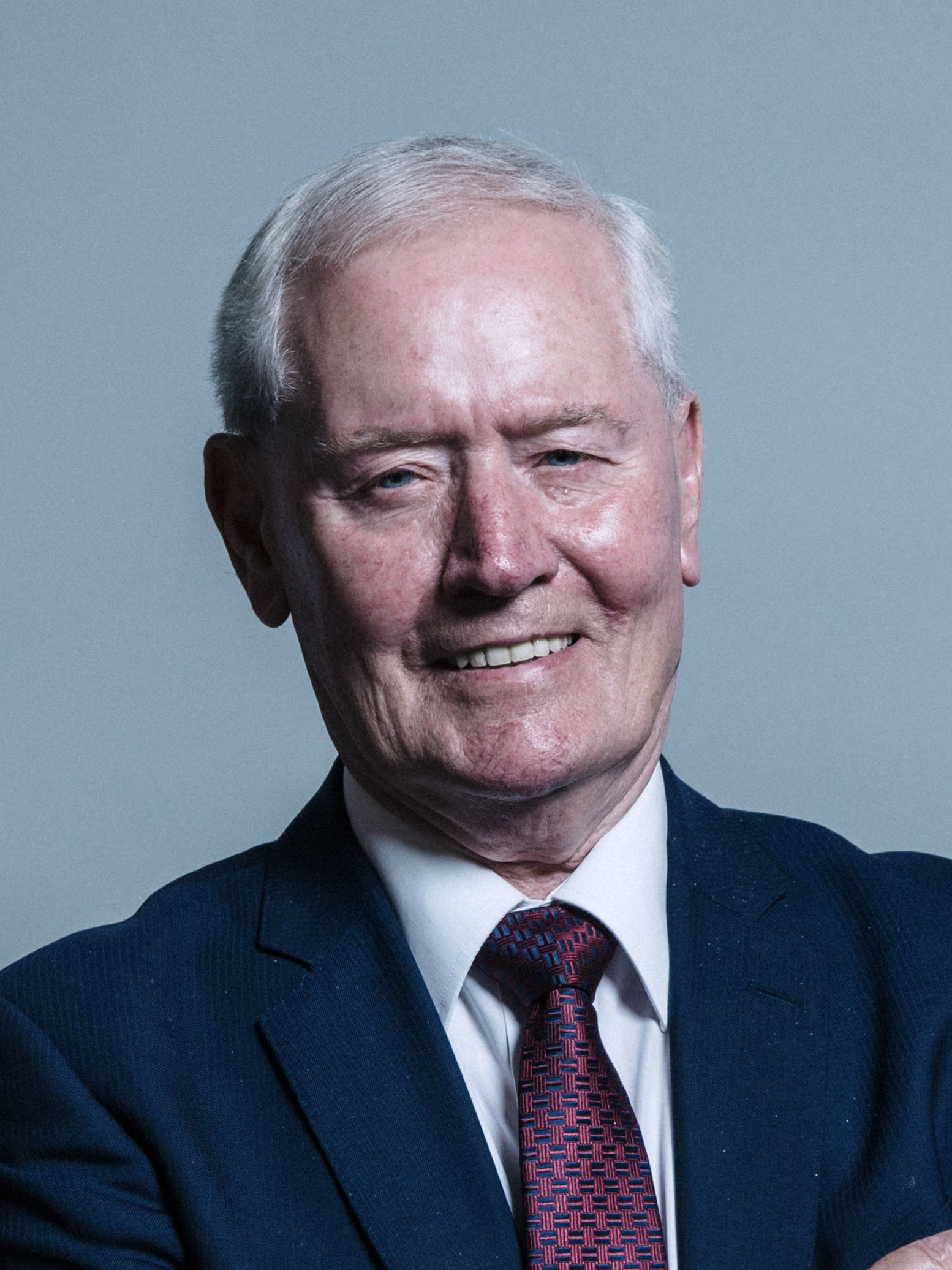

Member of Parliament for Coventry South Coventry South East (1992–1997)
- In office 9 April 1992 – 6 November 2019
- Preceded by: Dave Nellist
- Succeeded by: Zarah Sultana

Personal details
- Born: 4 February 1941 (age 85) Coatbridge, Lanarkshire, Scotland
- Party: Labour
- Spouse: Marion Douglas Podmore
- Education: Trade Union College in Tillicoultry
- Website: www.jimcunningham.org.uk

James Dolan Cunningham (born 4 February 1941) is a Labour Party politician in the United Kingdom. He served as the Member of Parliament (MP) for Coventry South, previously Coventry South East, from 1992 to 2019.

== Early life ==
Cunningham was born in Coatbridge, Scotland and educated locally at Columba High School before attending the Trade Union College in Tillicoultry, where he completed a number of Ruskin courses on industrial relations and trade union law. In 1964, he became an engineer for Rolls-Royce in Ansty, joining the Labour Party in 1966 he became a shop steward with the predecessors of the Manufacturing, Science and Finance Union in the Rolls-Royce plant from 1968 throughout his service as a councillor and later Deputy Leader and then Leader of Coventry City Council.

== Local government ==
Cunningham began his political career as a Coventry councillor in 1972 and became the Chair of the Council's Consumer Services Committee from 1975 until 1977. He was also the Vice-Chair of the Finance Committee for three terms, 1975 until 1977, 1979 until 1982 and from 1985 until 1988. He also served as the Vice-Chair of the Leisure Committee from 1975 until 1977, serving as the Chair from 1979 until 1982. He next served as the Vice-Chair of the Transport and Highways Committee from 1983 until 1985 when he became the Chief Whip of the Labour Group on the Council from 1985 until 1987 when he became the Deputy Leader of Coventry City Council. The following year, Cunningham was elected leader of the Labour group and therefore the council. Following becoming leader of the council, Cunningham left his job at Rolls-Royce as an engineer and shop steward. Cunningham did not take company shares when Rolls Royce was privatised.

Cunningham was leader of Coventry City Council until his election to Parliament in 1992.

As leader of Coventry City Council, Cunningham travelled extensively to cities in western and eastern Europe, many of which were twinned with Coventry. These visits included trips to Volgograd, Moscow, Caen, Frankfurt, Dresden, Prague and Warsaw. On one visit to Poland in 1990 Cunningham was part of a delegation to Auschwitz.

== Parliament ==
Cunningham was selected to contest the Coventry South East constituency at the 1992 general election following the expulsion of the sitting Labour MP Dave Nellist, a member of the Trotskyist Militant group, who had thus become ineligible to be selected as the Labour candidate. Cunningham emerged as the victor with a majority of 1,311 votes over the Conservative candidate Martine Hyams; Nellist finished third but only by a further 40 votes.

Cunningham made his maiden speech on 12 May 1992 in which he spoke of the social and economic problems of Coventry and criticised the then level of central government resources allocated to the city.

Following reports from the previous year that the Queen was to agree to pay income tax, which Buckingham Palace and the Prime Minister denied, he called for the Queen and other members of the Royal Family to begin paying income tax in his letter to the Chancellor of the Exchequer in 1992.

Cunningham was heavily involved in the campaign for justice for former workers of Matrix Churchill. In particular Cunningham was critical of the remit and progress of the Scott Report into the Arms-to-Iraq scandal for not consulting the former workers.

Reflecting his previous career, Cunningham set up the All-Party Parliamentary Group (APPG) for Rolls-Royce, bringing together MPs and trade unions. Throughout his time in Parliament, Cunningham consistently campaigned for Rolls-Royce workers.

In 1994 Cunningham chaired the Committee on the hybrid Croydon Tramlink Bill, which recommended the project go ahead. Cunningham was a founder member and served as chair of the APPG on Strokes. In 2002, Cunningham secured an adjournment debate on the subject.

He became a member of the Home Affairs Select Committee from 1993 until 1997. He then served on the Trade and Industry Select Committee from 1997 as well as serving upon the House of Commons Panel of Chairs from 1998, leaving both after the 2001 general election. Cunningham then served on the Constitutional Affairs Select Committee from 2003 until 2005.

Following the 1997 General Election, Cunningham presented a petition to the then Health Secretary Alan Milburn calling for the renovation of Walsgrave Hospital in Coventry. Towards the end of the meeting Milburn made clear that Coventry was a candidate for new hospital build via a PFI scheme and wanted proposals by the end of the year.

In 2004, he led a parliamentary campaign to prevent Jaguar Cars closing its Browns Lane assembly plant. This campaign included organising a meeting of several workers of the plant with the Prime Minister and the Chancellor of the Exchequer, as well as Cunningham joining factory workers when they lobbied the Ford managers at the Paris Motor Show.

Cunningham briefly served on the Office of the Deputy Prime Minister Select Committee in 2005 before the general election later that year.

Following the 2005 election, he served on the House of Commons Procedures Select Committee until 2006 and served as the Parliamentary Private Secretary (PPS) to the Solicitor General Mike O'Brien until 2007. Cunningham remained O'Brien's PPS as O'Brien became a Minister of State at the Department for Work and Pensions from 2007 until 2008, then a Minister of State at the Department of Energy and Climate Change from 2008 until 2009, and finally as a Minister of State at the Department of Health from 2009 until 2010. Cunningham also served on the Standards and Privileges Select Committee in 2010.

He served as the Treasurer of the All-Party Parliamentary Group on Funerals and Bereavement from 2005 until 2010 and was the Vice-Chair of the APPG on Chinese Development.

From 2005 to 2019, Cunningham was the Chair of the West Midlands Group of Labour MPs.

In 2006, Cunningham arranged a meeting between trade unions representing workers at Peugeot Ryton and the Chancellor Gordon Brown over threats to the future of the plant.

During the 2009 parliamentary expenses scandal, Cunningham was praised by The Telegraph, which cited his consistently low expenses that made him the 27th lowest claiming MP out of 645 MPs.

In 2009 Cunningham helped secure extra funding from the government for the Coventry Rape and Sexual Assault Centre (CRASAC).

In 2011, Cunningham arranged a meeting with the Minister for Defence Equipment, Support and Technology Peter Luff, as a response to Rolls-Royce's announcement that it would lay off one quarter of its staff at its Ansty plant by 2012 due to the UK defence cuts and the plant's reliance upon repairing and servicing RAF jet engines. As well as these planned redundancies, Rolls-Royce also plans temporary redundancies during periods of low activity and having staff work longer without being paid extra. Cunningham questioned what the government's plans were to secure more work for the plant and met with union officials and management in order to find a solution to safeguard the plant and its work force.

Alongside the then-Coventry North West MP Geoffrey Robinson, Cunningham lobbied successive governments for the development and expansion of Ansty Park as a centre for high tech manufacturing. This included a visit by the then-Minister Margaret Hodge to make sure the project did not stall.

Cunningham supported the campaign to renovate Coventry's medieval Charterhouse Priory, one of only nine Carthusian monasteries left in the UK. In 2012 he facilitated a visit by the then Parliamentary Under Secretary of State for Culture, Communications and Creative Industries Ed Vaizey to the site to draw attention to the campaign.

In 2013, Cunningham campaigned with Unite the Union to keep London Taxis International producing the iconic black Hackney cab in Coventry. Cunningham also actively campaigned to keep Jaguar Land Rover in the West Midlands following the purchase of the company by Tata. After raising the concerns of Trade Unions, Cunningham received assurances from Ratan Tata and the company secretary that work would stay in the region. In the same year Cunningham also campaigned to save the Remploy factory in his constituency.

Cunningham was also a long-term campaigner against the use and abuse of zero hours contracts. In a 2013 debate in Parliament he stated 'that zero-hours contracts are a throwback to the 1930s when miners and dockers had to turn up to work not knowing whether they would get a job. This is a modern veneer on an old, tried and tired system that was chucked out many years ago'.

He supported Owen Smith in the failed attempt to replace Jeremy Corbyn in the 2016 Labour leadership election.

Cunningham consistently called for the Government to intervene in the issues surrounding Coventry City Football Club. In 2016 he lobbied the then-Sports Minister Tracey Crouch to appoint a conciliator to break the deadlock in negotiations. In 2019 Cunningham helped to organise a meeting between the interested parties, local MPs and the then Secretary of State for Digital, Culture, Media and Sport, Jeremy Wright.

Cunningham actively supported Coventry's bid to be UK City of Culture 2021. As part of the campaign, Cunningham hosted a reception for the bid in Parliament and secured an adjournment debate.

Cunningham actively supported the WASPI campaign to compensate Women born in the 1950s who were effected by changes to pensions.

In 2019, Cunningham led a campaign to make sure specialist pancreatic cancer services remained at University Hospital Coventry. This included meeting with the Minister and raising the topic in the House of Commons at which point assurances were given that the service would not be moved. In the same year Cunningham became a prominent critic of the Conservative Government's plan to scrap free TV Licences for the over 75s.

He announced he would be standing down in the 2019 general election shortly after fellow Coventry MP Geoffrey Robinson also announced his intention to depart.

== Family ==
He has been married to Marion Douglas Podmore since 1985; each has children from previous marriages.

== News items ==
- Discussing closure of Ryton Peugeot plant
- Declaring the closure of the Peugeot plant as a 'callous act'
- His 2006 Notice of Redundancy Bill
- Displeasure over Jaguar's former Coventry plant in 2004

Parliament of the United Kingdom
Preceded by Dave Nellist	Member of Parliament for Coventry South East; 1992 – 1997	Constituency abolished
New constituency	Member of Parliament for Coventry South; 1997 – 2019	Succeeded by Zarah Sultana
