= Nigel Williamson =

British journalist

Nigel Williamson (born 1954) is a British journalist.

== Biography ==
Educated at University College London, Williamson worked as a reporter on Tribune (1982–84) and was then briefly its literary editor (1984) before becoming editor (1984–87) as successor to Chris Mullin. Just before the 1987 general election he was hired as the editor of the Labour Party's members' magazine Labour Party News (1987–89), to which he added the editorship of the party's monthly New Socialist (1987–89) replacing Stuart Weir. He also served as a press officer to Labour leader Neil Kinnock during the 1987 general election.

In 1989 Williamson joined The Times as a political correspondent with a twice weekly column on the op-ed page. He became diary editor (1990–92), then home news editor (1992–95) and Whitehall correspondent (1995–96). He went freelance in 1996 to become a music critic, celebrity interviewer and obituarist for The Times. He writes on pop and world music for a variety of publications and was a contributing editor to the magazines Uncut and Billboard. He is also a contributing editor of Songlines magazine. He has written several books, including Journey Through The Past: The Stories Behind The Classic Songs Of Neil Young, The Rough Guide to Bob Dylan, The Rough Guide to Led Zeppelin, The Rough Guide to The Best Music You've Never Heard and The Rough Guide to the Blues, The Straight Ahead Guide to Bob Dylan and The Straight Ahead Guide to Led Zeppelin.

Williamson is also a member of Kent County Cricket Club. He expressed his concern over Kent's logo rebrand in 2010, calling it "banal and meaningless". In 2011, Williamson and fellow member Graham Holland started a campaign for more open and accountable management of Kent County Cricket Club and for the club's first contested committee election since 2008.

Preceded by Chris Mullin	Editor of Tribune; 1984–1987	Succeeded by Phil Kelly
