= William Wilson (Coventry MP) =

British politician (1913–2010)

William Wilson DL

Member of Parliament for Coventry South East
- In office 28 February 1974 – 13 May 1983
- Preceded by: New constituency
- Succeeded by: Dave Nellist

Member of Parliament for Coventry South
- In office 15 October 1964 – 8 February 1974
- Preceded by: Philip Hocking
- Succeeded by: constituency abolished

Personal details
- Born: 28 June 1913
- Died: 18 August 2010 (aged 97)
- Citizenship: British
- Party: Labour
- Education: University of Birmingham

William Wilson DL (28 June 1913 – 18 August 2010), was a British Labour Party politician. He was a Member of Parliament (MP) for constituencies in Coventry from 1964 to 1983. He was the chairman of the British-Soviet Friendship Society from 1977 to 1983.

Wilson was educated at Coventry Technical College and Birmingham University. He served in the British Army during World War II in North Africa, Italy and Greece, rising to the rank of sergeant. After the war he qualified as a solicitor and made several unsuccessful attempts to win the Warwick and Leamington constituency in 1951, 1955, 1957 and 1959, before being successful in 1964 in Coventry South, which he represented (later as Coventry South East) until retiring from Parliament in 1983. He also was a Warwickshire County Councillor from 1958, being leader of the Labour Group in the 1960s and from 1972 to 1993.

Wilson was responsible for piloting the Divorce Reform Act 1969 through Parliament which changed the basis for divorce procedures from the old concept of matrimonial offences to that of the irretrievable breakdown of marriage.

== Sources ==
- "William Wilson" (obituary), The Times online, 20 September 2010.
- Obituary in Telegraph, 28 September 2010

Parliament of the United Kingdom
Preceded by Philip Hocking	Member of Parliament for Coventry South; 1964 – February 1974	Constituency abolished
New constituency	Member of Parliament for Coventry South East; February 1974 – 1983	Succeeded by Dave Nellist
