= Chris McLaughlin (journalist) =

British journalist (born 1955)

Chris McLaughlin (born 1955) is a British journalist, who between 2004 and 2018 was the editor of the Labour Party-supporting weekly UK magazine Tribune. Since Tribune's re-launch as a bi-monthly publication, McLaughlin is now the editor-at-large, in charge of the magazine's News output.

McLaughlin was previously the political editor of the Sunday Mirror, deputy Political Editor of The Mail on Sunday, European Editor and deputy Political Editor of The Scotsman and a columnist on The Big Issue, and until 1987 worked for Labour Weekly, the now closed official Labour Party newspaper.

McLaughlin served as a Labour councillor in the London Borough of Newham for four years.

Media offices
| Preceded by Mark Seddon | Editor of Tribune; 2004–2018 | Succeeded by Ronan Burtenshaw |
