= Jon Kimche =

Swiss journalist (1909–1994)

Jon Kimche (17 June 1909 – 9 March 1994) was a journalist and historian. A Swiss Jew, he arrived in England at the age of 12, becoming involved in the Independent Labour Party as a young man. In 1934–35, he worked with George Orwell in a Hampstead bookshop, Booklover's Corner, and later managed the ILP's bookshop at 35 Bride Street, near Ludgate Circus. As chair of the ILP Guild of Youth, he visited Barcelona in 1937, where he again met Orwell.

In the early war years, he contributed articles on military strategy to the Evening Standard and, on the recommendation of Michael Foot, was hired by Aneurin Bevan in 1942 as the de facto editor of the left-wing weekly Tribune. (Bevan was nominally the editor but had neither the time nor the technical expertise to do the job, and Kimche was both an alien and a member of the ILP rather than the Labour Party, which Tribune supported.) He left Tribune to join Reuters in 1945 but returned in 1946, though by now his primary interest was in the Middle East—specifically, in the creation of a Jewish state in Palestine. He was fired from his Tribune job after disappearing from the office in December 1947 to Istanbul to negotiate safe passage with the Turkish authorities for two ships sailing from Bulgaria with thousands of Jews aboard bound for Palestine.

From this point on, Kimche made a name for himself as an analyst of Middle Eastern politics, writing several books and innumerable articles. He was for 15 years editor of the Jewish Observer and Middle East Review and was Middle East correspondent of the Evening Standard until 1973. He was one of the original senior members of the Next Century Foundation.

Kimche wrote The Secret Roads: The "Illegal" Migration of People, 1938–1948, published by Secker and Warburg in 1954. The book details the passages of Jewish refugees throughout Europe en route to Palestine. The Haganah, and in some cases Jewish youth groups, such as the Bricha, accomplished this. Kimche documents this group's activities in arranging for Jewish orphans to arrive from all over Europe to Marseilles in 1947 and board the Exodus, which was bound for Palestine. He also wrote several books in collaboration with his brother David Kimche.

== Selected books ==
- (1950): Seven Fallen Pillars: The Middle East, 1915–1950. London: Secker & Warburg.
- (1955): with David Kimche, The Secret Roads: The "Illegal" Migration of a People, 1938–1948 (with plates, including portraits, and a map). London: Farrar, Straus and Cudahy.
- (1960): with David Kimche, Both Sides of the Hill: Britain and the Palestine War. London: Secker & Warburg.
  - US edition (1960): with David Kimche, A Clash of Destinies: The Arab-Jewish War and the Founding of the State of Israel. New York: Frederick A. Praeger.
- (1962): Spying for Peace: General Guisan and Swiss Neutrality (3rd edition). London: Weidenfeld & Nicolson.
- (1968): The Unfought Battle. New York: Stein and Day.
- (1968): The Unromantics: The Great Powers and the Balfour Declaration. London: Weidenfeld & Nicolson.
- (1969): with David Kimche, La Premiere Guerre d'Israel 1948: 16 Cartes. Paris: Arthaud.
- (1970): The Second Arab Awakening. London: Thames & Hudson.
- (1973): Palestine or Israel: The Untold Story of Why We Failed, 1917–1923, 1967–1973. London: Secker & Warburg.
  - US edition (1973): There Could Have Been Peace: The Untold Story of Why We Failed With Palestine and Again With Israel. New York: Dial Press.

Media offices
Preceded by Frederic Mullally and Evelyn Anderson	Editor of Tribune (jointly with Evelyn Anderson); 1946–1948	Succeeded by Michael Foot and Evelyn Anderson
