= Mark Seddon =

British journalist (born 1962)

- Born: 7 October 1962 (age 64)
- Education: University of East Anglia
- Occupations: Journalist, academic

Mark Anthony Paul Seddon (born 7 October 1962) is a British journalist and academic who has worked in broadcasting, international affairs, and politics. He was editor of Tribune before joining Al Jazeera English in 2005, where he helped establish its New York bureau and became its United Nations and New York City correspondent; he later served as the network's diplomatic correspondent.

Seddon later worked in the Communications and Speechwriting Unit for United Nations Secretary-General Ban Ki-moon and as Director of Communications for the International Commission on Financing Global Education Opportunity. He became an adjunct professor of international relations at Columbia University's Harriman Institute in 2017. He has also been active in the Labour Party, serving on its National Executive Committee and standing against John Bercow in Buckingham at the 2001 United Kingdom general election. He later wrote about his political and journalistic career in the 2011 book Standing for Something – Life in the Awkward Squad.

Seddon is the Director of the Centre for United Nations Studies at the University of Buckingham.

== Education and early life ==
The son of a British army officer, Seddon went to Dauntsey's School, an independent co-educational boarding school in the village of West Lavington in Wiltshire. He studied Development Studies at the University of East Anglia. Seddon's family home is in the Welsh Marches, in North West Herefordshire, England.

== Journalistic career ==
Seddon has written for The New York Times and The Boston Globe. He has been a diarist for the London Evening Standard and has contributed to newspapers such as The Guardian, The Independent, The Times, the Daily Mail, and The National (Abu Dhabi), as well as New Statesman, Private Eye, The Oldie, Country Life, and the website Big Think (New York). Also a prolific writer for Tribune, he served as that magazine's editor from 1993 until 2004.

On television, Seddon has reported for the BBC from inside Iraq, North Korea and China, as well as for Sky News from Yemen and for Al Jazeera English from North Korea, Syria, Democratic Republic of Congo, Kenya, Ethiopia and Haiti. Seddon also reported regularly from the United Nations and from the White House, and has lectured widely in North America and the UK. He became the United Nations and New York City correspondent for Al Jazeera English in 2005, having helped set up and run the first ever Al Jazeera English TV New York Bureau. He later returned to the UK to continue as Al Jazeera English TV's Diplomatic Correspondent. He was an early guest on Have I Got News for You, and has appeared as a commentator on numerous UK and US television and radio programmes, including Newsnight, Channel 4 News, Breakfast with Frost, The Politics Show and the Today programme.

In 2003, Seddon was the first journalist to reveal that "extraordinary rendition" had taken place in the British Indian Ocean Territory island of Diego Garcia. He repeated the claims for Al Jazeera English TV, shortly before the then Foreign Secretary, David Miliband, admitted that extraordinary rendition had indeed taken place on the island of Diego Garcia. Seddon was also the first foreign reporter to broadcast live from Pyongyang, the North Korean capital, in 2006, soon after performing the first trans Atlantic 'live' from the United Nations in New York to Doha for Al Jazeera English TV at the time of that Networks' launch. He is a former Vice President of the United Nations Correspondents Association and is currently a member of the Board of the Foreign Press Association (New York).

From 2014 to 2016, Seddon worked in the Communications and Speechwriting Unit for the Secretary-General of the United Nations, Ban Ki-moon. He subsequently became Director of Communications for the International Commission on Financing Global Education Opportunity, chaired by UN Special Envoy for Global Education and former UK Prime Minister, Gordon Brown. In September 2017 he became an adjunct professor in International Relations at Columbia University, New York, in the Harriman Institute. He returned to New York in August 2018, to work as Media Adviser to the President of the UN General Assembly, 73rd Session at UN Headquarters.

== Political career ==
Active in the Labour Party, Seddon worked for Gordon Brown during the 1992 general election. After Brown became Chancellor of the Exchequer, Seddon served for five years on the Chancellor's Economic Policy Commission. Seddon was elected to Labour's National Executive Committee as a Grassroots Alliance candidate in 1997, gaining the highest share of the vote. Re-elected several times, he remained an NEC member until standing down in 2005. In the 2001 General Election, Seddon ran for parliament in the safe Conservative seat of Buckingham, against future Speaker John Bercow.

In 2002, he was controversially removed from the shortlist to be Labour's candidate in the Ogmore by-election. Seddon was a vocal critic of many aspects of the last Labour government in the UK, particularly over the 2003 invasion of Iraq. He also opposed Britain's involvement in the war in Afghanistan from the outset. He backed Mayor of London Ken Livingstone's ultimately successful attempt to be readmitted to the Labour Party. In 2011 he published an autobiography, Standing for Something – Life in the Awkward Squad about his time as a dissenter within New Labour and as a foreign TV reporter.

After leaving the Labour Party NEC in 2005, he became the United Nations and New York City correspondent for Al Jazeera English, before returning to the UK to continue as Al Jazeera English TV's Diplomatic Correspondent. In 2011 he became the media advisor and speechwriter for the directly elected mayor of Tower Hamlets, Lutfur Rahman.

Seddon has campaigned for justice for the Chagossians of the British Indian Ocean Territory for 30 years. He was active in the campaign for new elections in the Maldives, following the toppling of that country's first democratic President, Mohamed Nasheed in a coup in 2012. Nasheed was an old school friend, and Seddon had backed his campaign for democracy in the Maldives.

== Academic career ==
Seddon is the Director of the Centre for United Nations Studies at the University of Buckingham, which was officially opened in September 2019 and offers an MA Degree in United Nations and Diplomatic Studies.

== Books ==
- Mark Seddon; Martin Rowson (26 September 2011). Standing for Something. Biteback Publishing. ISBN 978-1-84954-123-7. Archived from the original on 3 December 2011.
- Jeremy Corbyn and the Strange Re-birth of Labour England, with Francis Beckett and illustrated by Martin Rowson, September 2018, publisher; Biteback Publishing.
- 'Great British Elms. The remarkable story of an iconic tree and its return from the brink', by Mark Seddon and David Shreeve MBE. Photography by Sam Ford. Kew Publishing 2024

Media offices
Preceded by Paul Anderson	Editor of Tribune; 1993–2004	Succeeded by Chris McLaughlin
