= Philip Hocking =

Member of Parliament for Coventry South
- In office 8 October 1959 – 25 September 1964
- Preceded by: Elaine Burton
- Succeeded by: Bill Wilson

Personal details
- Born: 27 October 1925
- Died: 17 August 2008 (aged 82)
- Citizenship: British
- Party: Conservative

Philip Norman Hocking (27 October 1925 – 17 August 2008) was a British Conservative Party politician in the United Kingdom. He was Member of Parliament (MP) for Coventry South from 1959 to 1964.

During his tenure in the House of Commons he was parliamentary private secretary (PPS) to the Foreign Office. Hocking's victory in Coventry was certainly an achievement as the constituency was seen as a fairly strong Labour Party area and indeed he remains to this day the only Conservative to have won the seat. He became a close friend of Denys Bullard, another Conservative MP with agricultural interests whose seat depended on a small and hard-won majority in a difficult constituency. Hocking's most memorable contribution to the politics of the day was when he appeared on BBC Television following the Profumo affair. Hocking was asked if Harold Macmillan was finished politically; Hocking compared Macmillan to a pheasant once it has been shot. "It may have been shot," he said, "but it is still going to run and run." Having replaced Elaine Burton at the 1959 general election with the song "High Hopes" as his anthem, Hocking lost the 1964 election to William Wilson.

He lived in the Cotswolds throughout the rest of life, although latterly he had spent much time in America.

Parliament of the United Kingdom
Preceded by Elaine Burton	Member of Parliament for Coventry South; 1959–1964	Succeeded by William Wilson
