= Coventry South =

UK Parliament constituency (1950–1974, 1997 onwards)

Coordinates: 52.39°N 1.52°W

- Borough constituency for the House of Commons
- Interactive map of boundaries from 2024
- Boundary of Coventry South in West Midlands region
- County: West Midlands
- Electorate: 70,998 (2023)

Current constituency
- Created: 1997
- Member of Parliament: Zarah Sultana (Your Party)
- Seats: One
- Created from: Coventry South East, Coventry South West

1950–1974
- Seats: One
- Type of constituency: Borough constituency
- Created from: Coventry East and Coventry West
- Replaced by: Coventry South East, Coventry South West

Coventry South is a constituency (Note: A borough constituency (for the purposes of election expenses and type of returning officer)) represented in the House of Commons of the UK Parliament since 2019 by Zarah Sultana, representing the Labour Party until her suspension and whip withdrawal on 23 July 2024 for voting against the two-child benefit cap. (Note: As with all constituencies, the constituency elects one Member of Parliament (MP) by the first past the post system of election at least every five years.) She resigned her party membership in June 2025 and joined Your Party in November 2025.

== Constituency profile ==
The Coventry South constituency is located in Coventry, a city in the West Midlands. The constituency contains the city centre and the suburbs to its south, including the neighbourhoods of Hillfields, Stoke Aldermoor, Cheylesmore, Stivichall and Canley. Coventry is a historic cathedral city which became an important centre for the British motor industry in the mid-20th century, but suffered a decline after the closure of most factories in the 1980s. The constituency is diverse in terms of wealth; Hillfields is densely-populated and falls within the 10% most deprived areas in England, whilst Cannon Park and Stivichall are amongst the 10% least-deprived. The constituency contains Coventry University and the University of Warwick and thus has a large student population.

On average, residents of Coventry South are considerably younger and have higher levels of education and professional employment compared to the rest of the country. The constituency is ethnically diverse; at the 2021 census, White people made up 61% of the population, Asians (primarily Indians) were 21% and Black people were 10%. At the city council, the areas close to the city centre are represented by Labour Party councillors whilst the outer, wealthier wards elected Conservatives. In the 2016 referendum, voters in the constituency were evenly split on the question of European Union membership with an estimated 50% voting for each option, whilst the rest of the city favoured leaving.

== History ==
The constituency was created for the 1950 general election, abolished for the February 1974 general election and recreated for the 1997 general election by the merger of the former seats of Coventry South East and Coventry South West. Since 1964 the various forms of the seat, excluding the gap period, have elected the Labour candidate. The Conservative candidates, since a win in 1959, have consistently taken second place. In 2019, following the retirement of Jim Cunningham, Labour narrowly held onto the seat by 401 votes; the Conservatives made their best performance since the seat's recreation,

In 2015, the local UKIP party originally selected Mark Taylor as candidate, but he stood aside when instructed to by "party bosses." UKIP wanted to replace Taylor with "anti-gay Christian preacher" George Hargreaves. The following week, Taylor was reinstated as candidate.

== Boundaries ==
Map of boundaries 1997–2024

1950–1974: The County Borough of Coventry wards of Cheylesmore, Earlsdon, Godiva, St Michael's, Westwood, and Whoberley.

From 1974 to 1997, the city centre was part of the now-abolished Coventry South East constituency.

1997–2024: The City of Coventry wards of Binley and Willenhall, Cheylesmore, Earlsdon, St Michael's, Wainbody, and Westwood.

2024–present: The City of Coventry wards of Cheylesmore, Earlsdon, Lower Stoke, St. Michael’s, Wainbody, and Westwood.

The Binley and Willenhall ward was transferred to the re-established seat of Coventry East in exchange for the Lower Stoke ward from the abolished Coventry North East constituency.

== Members of Parliament ==
=== MPs 1950–1974 ===
Election	Member	Party
1950	Elaine Burton	Labour
1959	Philip Hocking	Conservative
1964	Bill Wilson	Labour
Feb 1974	constituency abolished	

=== MPs 1997–present ===
Election	Member	Party
1997	Jim Cunningham	Labour
2019	Zarah Sultana	Labour
2024	Zarah Sultana	Independent
2025	Zarah Sultana	Your Party

== Elections ==
=== Elections in the 2020s ===
General election 2024: Coventry South
Party	Candidate	Votes	%	±%
Labour	Zarah Sultana	20,361	47.6	+3.3
Conservative	Mattie Heaven	10,160	23.8	−18.7
Reform	Chris Baddon	5,711	13.4	+10.5
Liberal Democrats	Stephen Richmond	2,531	5.9	−0.8
Green	Anne Patterson	2,363	5.5	+2.9
Workers Party	Mohammed Syed	777	1.8	N/A
SDP	Alastair Mellon	334	0.8	N/A
Independent	Niko Omilana	263	0.6	N/A
Independent	Joshua Morland	231	0.5	N/A
Majority		10,201	23.8	+22.9
Registered electors		76,262		
Turnout		42,731	56.0	−7.5
Labour hold		Swing	+11.0	

=== Elections in the 2010s ===
General election 2019: Coventry South
Party	Candidate	Votes	%	±%
Labour	Zarah Sultana	19,544	43.4	−11.6
Conservative	Mattie Heaven	19,143	42.5	+4.4
Liberal Democrats	Stephen Richmond	3,398	7.5	+4.6
Brexit Party	James Crocker	1,432	3.2	New
Green	Becky Finlayson	1,092	2.4	+1.1
Independent	Ed Manning	435	1.0	New
Majority		401	0.9	−16.0
Turnout		45,044	63.5	−2.9
Registered electors		70,970		
Labour hold		Swing	-8.0	

General election 2017: Coventry South
Party	Candidate	Votes	%	±%
Labour	Jim Cunningham	25,874	55.0	+12.7
Conservative	Michelle Lowe	17,927	38.1	+3.1
Liberal Democrats	Greg Judge	1,343	2.9	−1.2
UKIP	Ian Rogers	1,037	2.2	−10.9
Green	Aimee Challenor	604	1.3	−2.6
Independent	Sandra Findlay	224	0.5	New
Majority		7,947	16.9	+9.6
Turnout		47,009	66.4	+5.2
Registered electors		70,754		
Labour hold		Swing	+4.8	

General election 2015: Coventry South
Party	Candidate	Votes	%	±%
Labour	Jim Cunningham	18,472	42.3	+0.5
Conservative	Gary Ridley	15,284	35.0	+1.6
UKIP	Mark Taylor	5,709	13.1	+9.3
Liberal Democrats	Greg Judge	1,779	4.1	−13.9
Green	Benjamin Gallaher	1,719	3.9	+2.5
TUSC	Judy Griffiths	650	1.5	New
Mainstream	Christopher Rooney	86	0.2	New
Majority		3,188	7.3	−1.1
Turnout		43,699	61.2	−1.2
Labour hold		Swing	-0.5	

General election 2010: Coventry South
Party	Candidate	Votes	%	±%
Labour	Jim Cunningham	19,197	41.8	−4.0
Conservative	Kevin Foster	15,352	33.4	+2.9
Liberal Democrats	Brian Patton	8,278	18.0	+0.4
UKIP	Mark Taylor	1,767	3.8	+1.8
Socialist	Judy Griffiths	691	1.5	−1.3
Green	Stephen Gray	639	1.4	New
Majority		3,845	8.4	−6.9
Turnout		45,924	62.4	+3.3
Labour hold		Swing	-3.4	

=== Elections in the 2000s ===
General election 2005: Coventry South
Party	Candidate	Votes	%	±%
Labour	Jim Cunningham	18,649	45.8	−4.4
Conservative	Heather Wheeler	12,394	30.5	+1.0
Liberal Democrats	Vincent McKee	7,228	17.8	+3.7
Socialist	Robert Windsor	1,097	2.7	New
UKIP	William Brown	829	2.0	New
Independent	Irene Rogers	344	0.8	−0.6
Families First	James Rooney	144	0.4	New
Majority		6,255	15.3	−5.4
Turnout		40,685	59.1	+3.8
Labour hold		Swing	-2.7	

General election 2001: Coventry South
Party	Candidate	Votes	%	±%
Labour	Jim Cunningham	20,125	50.2	−0.7
Conservative	Heather Wheeler	11,846	29.5	+0.5
Liberal Democrats	Vincent McKee	5,672	14.1	+4.9
Socialist Alliance	Robert Windsor	1,475	3.7	New
Independent	Irene Rogers	564	1.4	New
Socialist Labour	Timothy Logan	414	1.0	New
Majority		8,279	20.7	−1.2
Turnout		40,096	55.3	−13.4
Labour hold		Swing	-0.6	

=== Election in the 1990s ===
General election 1997: Coventry South
Party	Candidate	Votes	%	±%
Labour	Jim Cunningham	25,511	50.9	
Conservative	Paul Ivey	14,558	29.0	
Liberal Democrats	Gordon MacDonald	4,617	9.2	
Socialist	Dave Nellist	3,262	6.5	
Referendum	Paul Garratt	943	1.9	
Liberal	Roger Jenking	725	1.4	
BNP	Jeffrey Ashberry	328	0.7	
Rainbow Dream Ticket	Anne−Marie Bradshaw	180	0.4	
Majority		10,953	21.9	
Turnout		50,124	68.7	
Labour win (seat recreated)				

=== Election in the 1970s ===
General election 1970: Coventry South
Party	Candidate	Votes	%	±%
Labour	Bill Wilson	30,010	51.90	
Conservative	George Gardiner	27,816	48.10	
Majority		2,194	3.80	
Turnout		57,826	74.42	
Labour hold		Swing		

=== Elections in the 1960s ===
General election 1966: Coventry South
Party	Candidate	Votes	%	±%
Labour	Bill Wilson	31,237	54.87	
Conservative	Philip Hocking	25,697	45.13	
Majority		5,540	9.74	
Turnout		56,934	80.21	
Labour hold		Swing		

General election 1964: Coventry South
Party	Candidate	Votes	%	±%
Labour	Bill Wilson	29,240	51.62	
Conservative	Philip Hocking	27,407	48.38	
Majority		1,833	3.24	N/A
Turnout		56,647	79.79	
Labour gain from Conservative		Swing		

=== Elections in the 1950s ===
General election 1959: Coventry South
Party	Candidate	Votes	%	±%
Conservative	Philip Hocking	28,584	51.65	+3.24
Labour	Elaine Burton	26,754	48.35	−3.24
Majority		1,830	3.30	N/A
Turnout		55,338	82.11	
Conservative gain from Labour		Swing	+3.24	

General election 1955: Coventry South
Party	Candidate	Votes	%	±%
Labour	Elaine Burton	27,449	51.59	−3.56
Conservative	Muriel Williamson	25,761	48.41	+3.56
Majority		1,688	3.18	−7.12
Turnout		53,210	81.36	−4.81
Labour hold		Swing	-3.56	

General election 1951: Coventry South
Party	Candidate	Votes	%	±%
Labour	Elaine Burton	29,271	55.15	+2.46
Conservative	John Biggs-Davison	23,803	44.85	+3.64
Majority		5,468	10.30	−1.18
Turnout		53,074	86.17	−1.08
Labour hold		Swing		

General election 1950: Coventry South
Party	Candidate	Votes	%	±%
Labour	Elaine Burton	27,977	52.69	
Conservative	Leslie Hore-Belisha	21,885	41.21	
Liberal	Richard Soper	3,239	6.10	
Majority		6,092	11.48	
Turnout		53,101	87.25	
Labour win (new seat)				

== See also ==
- List of parliamentary constituencies in the West Midlands (county)
- List of parliamentary constituencies in West Midlands (region)
