= Paul Anderson (journalist) =

British journalist and academic

Paul Anderson (born 1959) is a British journalist, author and academic. He is chiefly known as the editor of several political journals.

== Early life and education ==
Anderson was born in Edinburgh, and grew up in Ipswich. He studied philosophy, politics and economics at Balliol College, Oxford (1978–1981) and journalism at the London College of Printing (1982–1983).

== Career ==
Anderson was deputy editor of European Nuclear Disarmament Journal (1984–1987), reviews editor of Tribune (1986–1991), editor of Tribune (1991–1993), and deputy editor of the New Statesman (1993–1996), news editor of Red Pepper (1997–1999) and deputy editor of the New Times (1999–2000). Since 1999 Anderson has worked as a contract subeditor on a number of publications, including The Guardian.

Anderson is co-author with Nyta Mann of Safety First: The Making of New Labour (1997), an analysis of how the changes made by Neil Kinnock to Labour Party policies led to the development of New Labour under Tony Blair and Gordon Brown. In a review in The Guardian the Labour MP Roy Hattersley praised Safety First for its detailed coverage of such issues as John Prescott's transformation of ministerial governing, and the Party's "Euro- keynesianism," calling it the "best" book on New Labour. Anderson is also editor of Orwell in Tribune: "As I Please" and Other Writings (2006).

Anderson taught journalism at City University, London from 2000 to 2011 and subsequently at the University of Essex.

Anderson established book publisher Aaaargh! Press in 2012.

== Bibliography ==
- Kaldor, Mary; Anderson, Paul, eds. (1986). Mad Dogs: The US raid on Libya. Pluto Press. ISBN 0-7453-0196-7.
- Anderson, Paul; Mann, Nyta (1997). Safety First: The Making of New Labour. Granta Books. ISBN 9781862070707.
- Orwell, George (2008). Anderson, Paul (ed.). Orwell in Tribune: "As I Please" and Other Writings, 1943-47. Methuen. ISBN 9780413776655.
- Anderson, Paul (2013). Moscow Gold?: The Soviet Union and the British Left. Aaaargh! Press. ASIN B00EX9FBGC.

Media offices
Preceded by Phil Kelly	Editor of Tribune; 1991–1993	Succeeded by Mark Seddon
