= Phil Kelly (journalist) =

English journalist (born 1946)

Mayor of Islington
- In office 12 May 2011 – 10 May 2012
- Deputy: Jilani Chowdhury
- Preceded by: Mouna Hamitouche
- Succeeded by: Jilani Chowdhury

Islington Borough Councillor for Finsbury Park Ward
- In office 4 May 2006 – 22 May 2014
- Preceded by: Richard Steer
- Succeeded by: Gary Heather

Islington Borough Councillor for Hillmarton Ward
- In office 3 May 1990 – 7 May 1998
- Succeeded by: Edward Featherstone

Editor of Tribune
- In office 1987–1991
- Preceded by: Nigel Williamson
- Succeeded by: Paul Anderson

Islington Borough Councillor for Canonbury East
- In office October 1984 – 8 May 1986

Personal details
- Born: 1946 (age 79–80) Wigan, Lancashire, England
- Party: Labour
- Education: Leeds University
- Profession: Journalist

Phil Kelly (born 1946) is an English journalist.

Born in Wigan and educated at St Mary's College Crosby and Leeds University, Kelly worked on Time Out and the Leveller in the 1970s and joined Tribune in the mid-1980s, working as a reporter and then news editor before becoming editor (1987–1991).

Kelly subsequently worked as an aide to the Labour MP, Michael Meacher. He was a Labour Islington councillor in 1984-86 and 1990–98, latterly as the council's deputy leader. He was re-elected to the Council in 2006.

He then became a partner at public affairs consultants Butler Kelly Ltd.

Preceded by Nigel Williamson	Editor of Tribune; 1987–1991	Succeeded by Paul Anderson
Preceded by Mouna Hamitouche	Mayor of Islington; 12 May 2011 – 10 May 2012	Succeeded by Jilani Chowdhury
