= Richard Clements (journalist) =

English journalist (1928–2006)

Richard Harry Clements
- Born: 11 October 1928; London, England
- Died: 23 November 2006 (aged 78); Barnet, London, England
- Occupations: Journalist, Political adviser
- Notable credit: Tribune
- Spouse: Bridget MacDonald (1952 – 2006; his death)
- Children: 2

Richard Harry "Dick" Clements (11 October 1928 – 23 November 2006) was an English journalist and was editor of the left-wing weekly Tribune from 1961 to 1982.

== Early life ==
Clements's father, Harry, was an osteopath. His mother, Sonia Edleman, was an American who had both Russian and Jewish forebears. Richard was their second son. His family were left-wing in their politics. His American uncle lobbied Congress on behalf of a trade union, his mother was a Tolstoyan anarchist and follower of Peter Kropotkin, and his father was a pacifist who had been imprisoned as a conscientious objector during the First World War.

Clements was educated at King Alfred School, Hampstead, until the outbreak of the Second World War. His parents then sent him to live with his uncle in the United States, where he was enrolled at Western High School in Washington, DC. On his return to London he studied briefly at either the London School of Economics or the Regent Street Polytechnic. He completed his National Service in the Merchant Navy, as an apprentice, choosing that instead of carrying a gun.

== Career ==
=== Journalism ===
Clements began his career in journalism in 1949 when he joined the Middlesex Independent newspaper. In 1951 he moved to the Leicester Mercury. It was during this time period that he became friends with one of the local MPs, Herbert Bowden, who would later become chairman of ITV. In 1953 he became editor of Socialist Advance, the Labour Party's youth paper.

Clements worked briefly for the Daily Herald before joining Tribune in 1956 as a reporter. There Clements gained experience in a number of areas in addition to straight reporting including page layout and copy editing. He was also involved in organising the Tribune rallies at Labour party conferences. In 1959 his book, Glory Without Power, an examination of trade unions, was published. According to Michael Foot, Clements suggested Tribune adopt the slogan "The paper that leads the anti-H bomb campaign" in its masthead (a newspaper feature known internationally as a nameplate); Nye Bevan regarded this as "a calculated affront to himself", Clements having previously leaked the details of heated discussions involving Bevan, Jennie Lee (Bevan's wife) and Foot over which political position the Labour party should take regarding the nuclear bomb.

Clements became editor of the Tribune in 1961, aged 33. Clements was known for being less than reverent in his reporting of disputes between the various organisations on the left and far-left of the movement. He would, however, publish pieces on party policy written from viewpoints with which he did not personally agree a fact which Tam Dalyell said had impressed him. Clements proved an adept fundraiser for the Tribune, a magazine that is perpetually short of money. The Times obituary says of him, "people liked him and would do things for him either for a pittance or free of charge". He also sought funding from a mixture of trades unions and advertising. To keep running costs low he wrote much of the magazine himself. He also accepted submissions from freelance writers, very few of whom were paid for their work but instead donated it for the cause.

It was during Clements' editorship of the Tribune that he first met the newly elected MP for Bedwellty, Neil Kinnock. The Kinnocks and the Clements became friends, with the Clements guiding the younger Kinnocks. Five years later, in 1975, Clements chose Kinnock to give the speech at the Tribune rally appealing for funds. This was to prove an important moment in Kinnock's political career.

=== Post-journalism ===
Clements left the Tribune in 1982 and became office manager for Michael Foot, the leader of the Labour Party. Foot's predecessor, James Callaghan, had offered Clements the chance to stand for Labour in a safe seat in East London in the 1979 general election. Clements had declined the offer, insisting on a selection ballot, which he lost narrowly. After Foot's resignation following Labour's landslide defeat in the 1983 general election, Clements continued in a similar role for the new leader, Neil Kinnock, although his title was officially that of "executive officer". It was said of Clements that he was "Kinnock's closest ally and a shaper of Labour's strategies". He retired from the position in 1987, although Geoffrey Goodman has speculated that he might have agreed to become "Kinnock's Alastair Campbell" had Labour won the 1992 general election. His final job was director of the Citizen's Income Trust, a registered charity which focuses on the concept of a citizen's income in the context of the British political system.

== Allegations of spying ==
In 1999, he was named by the Sunday Times as a Soviet "agent-of-influence". Basing its story on documents from the Mitrokhin Archive, the paper alleged that Moscow regarded Clements, operating under the code-name of "Dan", as "its most reliable propaganda tool in Britain". Documents from the archive purportedly show that the KGB provided Clements with text which he then published in the Tribune and that he also published articles based on information supplied by a Russian organisation known as "Service A". Although Clements acknowledged meeting Russian officials, he denied being a spy, pointing to the large number of anti-Soviet articles published by Tribune under his editorship. He said that claims he was a spy was "an over-inflated claim". In his opinion, "They may have thought they were controlling me, but they were not. I suspect they exaggerated their reports to Moscow. Perhaps they were boosting their expenses." Tam Dalyell wrote "Anyone less likely, then, than Dick Clements to allow himself to become [a KGB agent] is hard to imagine."

== Personal life ==
Clements was married to Bridget MacDonald, a great-niece of Ramsay MacDonald. They had two sons, Robert and Nicholas. In his final years he suffered from Parkinson's disease. He died in Barnet.

Preceded by Michael Foot	Editor of Tribune; 1961–1982	Succeeded by Chris Mullin
