= Evelyn Anderson (journalist) =

British journalist

Evelyn N. Anderson (1909–1977) was a German-British journalist who was joint editor of the left-wing newspaper Tribune from 1946 to 1952.

Born Lore Seligmann on 13 May 1909 to a German Jewish family, she joined the Communist Party of Germany (KPD) while a student in Frankfurt in 1927. She abandoned the KPD two years later over its sectarian attacks on the German Social Democratic Party (SPD), and subsequently joined a small left-wing SPD fraction, the Leninist Organisation, later known as Neu Beginnen. After Adolf Hitler’s rise to power in 1933, she left Germany for Britain, where she and her husband Paul Anderson (1908–1972) became members of the small group of socialist exiles from Nazi Germany in Britain that included Julius Braunthal and Franz Borkenau.

Her long article "The Underground Struggle in Germany", published under the pseudonym Evelyn Lend, occupied nearly the whole of an issue of Fact, edited by Raymond Postgate, in 1938. She revisited the subject in Hammer or Anvil?: the Story of the German Working Class Movement, which George Orwell's wife Eileen helped to edit and Orwell reviewed in the Manchester Evening News.

The couple worked for British black propaganda radio station Sender der Europäischen Revolution, which broadcast news and anti-Nazi propaganda to Germany between 1940 and 1942. She joined the left-wing weekly newspaper Tribune in 1943 as assistant editor, covering foreign affairs. She became a close friend of Orwell when he joined the paper later the same year, and her strong antipathy to communism played a major role in determining the paper's political stance in the late 1940s, although she was considered obsessive about eastern Europe by some members of staff. She was joint editor of the Tribune from 1946 to 1952, sharing the job first with Jon Kimche and then with Michael Foot. She later collaborated with the historian Walter Laqueur on a political dictionary.

== Books ==
- Hammer or Anvil? The Story of the German Working Class Movement, Victor Gollancz Ltd, London (1945)
- A Dictionary of Politics, Weidenfeld and Nicolson, London (1971)
