= The Starmer Project =

2022 book by Oliver Eagleton

The Starmer Project: A Journey to the Right
- Author: Oliver Eagleton
- Language: English
- Subject: Keir Starmer
- Genre: Political science
- Publisher: Verso Books
- Publication date: 26 April 2022
- Publication place: United Kingdom
- Media type: Paperback
- Pages: 240
- ISBN: 978-1-83976-464-6

The Starmer Project: A Journey to the Right is a 2022 book by British journalist Oliver Eagleton, published by Verso Books. It is a political biography of British Labour Party leader Keir Starmer, and follows his time in the Crown Prosecution Service and Shadow Cabinet of Jeremy Corbyn, his predecessor, covering his political alliances, his victory in the 2020 Labour Party leadership election, and subsequent leadership of the Labour Party.

== Background ==
After working as a barrister and senior civil servant, Starmer became a Member of Parliament (MP) for the Labour Party, a centre-left political party in the United Kingdom that acted as the main political opposition to the centre-right Conservative government. He has represented the constituency of Holborn and St Pancras in the House of Commons since 2015. He was elected party leader in April 2020, after his predecessor Jeremy Corbyn presided over a landslide defeat in the 2019 general election. During Corbyn's leadership, Labour shifted to the left from the centre ground. For most of the life of Corbyn's shadow cabinet, Starmer served as Shadow Secretary of State for Exiting the European Union. In the 2020 leadership election, Starmer ran on both a soft left and centrist platform, and suspended Corbyn from the Parliamentary Labour Party in January 2021.

Oliver Eagleton, the author of The Starmer Project, is the son of writer Terry Eagleton. He is an editor for the socialist journal New Left Review. He began writing The Starmer Project following his work on an article about Starmer's tenure as Director of Public Prosecutions in January 2021, announcing the book in August with an expected release date of May 2022. Although Eagleton has a negative view of Starmer, he said: "It is important to be constructive and clear-eyed. I hope that the tone of the book isn't just polemical." The Starmer Project is Eagleton's first book and was published by Verso Books.

== Synopsis ==
This book is a short biography of Starmer divided into four chapters. Chapter one, "The Lawyer", is about his legal career. Chapter two, "The Politician", is about his first five years as a member of parliament. Chapter three, "The Candidate", is about the 2020 Labour leadership election. Chapter four, "The Leader", is about the aftermath of the leadership election.

The Starmer Project is critical and hostile towards Starmer and portrays him as a ruthless person who sabotaged Corbyn's leadership to succeed him as Labour's leader. During the Brexit process, Eagleton argues, Starmer led a small group of anti-Brexit MPs, including other shadow ministers, who manipulated Corbyn into changing the party's Brexit policy from 2018 onward (previously, the party had pledged to accept the result of the 2016 Brexit referendum). Labour failed to maintain its coalition of voters at the 2019 national election, in which party policy was to campaign for a second Brexit referendum. He campaigned for the leadership in 2020 on a promise to continue Corbyn's policies if elected leader but purged the left from the party leadership upon gaining power; for example, he removed his leadership rival Rebecca Long-Bailey from his shadow cabinet. His libertarianism slowly turns into paternalism, and he pledges to give Britain's voters security. Starmer focuses on non-partisan issues, such as incompetence, and is described as an authoritarian centrist who wants technocratic reform. He is also alleged to have been contradictory throughout his career.

An updated version (ISBN 978-1-83674-039-1) was published in August 2025.

== Reception ==
In the New Statesman, Richard Seymour calls the book "[t]he most detailed study of the Labour leader" and "the best account of his leadership so far". The Independent's Andrew Grice described the book as a "cogent left-wing critique" of Starmer's Labour leadership. He adds that while Eagleton appears too pessimistic around Starmer's climate action and opposition to rentier capitalism, he is correct to call for more action against the ruling Conservative Party. In The Times, Patrick Maguire calls the book an "aggressive, critical account of [Starmer's] time in public life" and "the meatiest biography of the leader of the opposition to date". Maguire believes "Eagleton's depiction of the politics of Starmer's parliamentary career [to be] wide of the mark" and argues that Starmer's political trajectory is better explained as a progression from being an outsider to an insider in government than from left to right. Writing in The Daily Telegraph, Tom Harris gave the book two out of five stars, criticising its defence of Corbyn's political positions and accusing it of left-wing bias. Harris said that some of the book's content was valid, but Eagleton's bias had made it "difficult to take the rest of his political agenda seriously".
