= Counterfire (group) =

Revolutionary socialist organisation

- Predecessor: Socialist Workers Party
- Formation: March 8, 2010; 16 years ago
- Founder: John Rees (among others)
- Headquarters: London
- Region served: Britain
- Key people: Chris Nineham, Lindsey German, Michael Lavalette
- Affiliations: Your Party (until April 2026)
- Website: www.counterfire.org

Counterfire is a Marxist and revolutionary socialist organisation in the United Kingdom. Founded in 2010, it runs a website and has published pamphlets under the Counterfire imprint. It has its origins in the Trotskyist political tradition.

== History ==
Counterfire was launched on International Women's Day in 2010, following a split from the Socialist Workers Party. Counterfire has been involved in social movements, having created the Coalition of Resistance in 2010 (now called the People's Assembly Against Austerity). The group was also involved in the Stop the War Coalition.

A number of Counterfire members, including Lindsey German, John Rees and Chris Nineham, have played prominent roles in the Stop the War Coalition, both before and after the formation of Counterfire. In 2010, Counterfire was instrumental in establishing a new campaigning organisation, Coalition of Resistance, to oppose the Conservative-led government’s austerity programme, following a call by Tony Benn. This group involved individuals including Jeremy Corbyn, John McDonnell, Bob Crow of the RMT, Mark Serwotka of the PCS and other organisations which included Socialist Resistance, the Communist Party of Britain and the Green Party. The first convention for the movement was held in November 2010, and was attended by 1000 people partly due to the efforts of Counterfire.

In 2013, this was supplanted by the People's Assembly Against Austerity, which Counterfire has continued to actively promote. The activities by the people's assembly have helped increase Counterfire's membership by 210 members between 2010-2015.

On 15 February 2023, the steering committee of rs21 called for the removal of an article published by Counterfire on 13 February for the article being: "which can only at present be described as transphobic and reactionary." Rs21's article was made in the context of the murder of Brianna Ghey, and their article also criticised Counterfire's positions on transphobia. Counterfire's article argued that liberalism has affected left wing groups, that this is the result of liberalism's cultural hegemony, and that the left needs to "free itself from the dominance of radical-seeming liberal ideas". The article identifies these ideas as being critical race theory, the Decriminalization of sex work and gender identity (specifically conflating pronouns with biological sex). An opinion piece published by Counterfire on 17 February acknowledged Ghey's murder and the vigils that had occurred in response, noted the need for support for transgender people, and mentioned the vigils that were occurring on 18 February. The article did not make mention of the article criticised by rs21.

Counterfire and Michael Lavalette were majorly involved in the launch of Your Party's Manchester branch launch, and were criticised by Workers Power for a lack of transparency and being undemocratic.

Counterfire members were banned from attending the Your Party conference in November 2025, with Michael Lavalette being told Counterfire was considered a disruptive organisation. Lavalette was initially banned but then allowed to attend the conference. John Rees alleged that the expulsions were done by people affiliated with Jeremy Corbyn to split Zarah Sultana's supporters.

On 11 April 2026, in response to a leaked Your Party motion to ban dual membership for specific organisations, Counterfire spoke out against the ban and threatened to leave if the motion passed. The motion passed on 12 April, leading to all members of Counterfire leaving Your Party.

== Political views and activity ==
Counterfire believes in creating a revolutionary vanguard party via participation in a united front to campaign on issues. Counterfire's policies are the same as some held by the SWP, including the lack of transitional demands and internationalism through anti-imperialism.

Counterfire was supportive of the Arab spring uprisings in 2011. As part of the Stop the War Coalition, it opposed subsequent military interventions involving the UK in Libya and Syria.

Between 2012 and 2013, Counterfire ran a left-wing café in London called Firebox, where it hosted political events aimed at building socialist ideas. It also organised political theory and organising events including citizen activism day schools.

Counterfire was strongly supportive of Jeremy Corbyn's leadership of the Labour Party (2015–2019) but maintained an independent organisation and publications, rather than joining the Labour Party. The organisation defended Corbyn against accusations of antisemitism and in 2018 opposed the Labour Party national executive's adoption of the IHRA definition of antisemitism, arguing that it was weaponising antisemitism for political ends.

In 2014, Counterfire advocated voting Yes in the referendum on Scottish independence and supported the left-wing Radical Independence Campaign.

In 2016, the organisation supported the Leave campaign in the referendum on UK membership of the European Union, opposing the EU as "an aggressive, free market, neoliberal project".

At the People's Assembly Against Austerity protest outside the Conservative Party Conference in 2017, Counterfire activist Shabbir Lakha confronted Jacob Rees-Mogg MP, who was then being touted as a potential next leader of the party, over his support for austerity.

Counterfire members in the Stop the War Coalition and People's Assembly Against Austerity played prominent roles in organising the demonstration against Donald Trump's state visit to the UK in 2019 where an estimated 250,000 people marched through London against the US president.

Counterfire supported the Clapham Common vigil for Sarah Everard in March 2021, where they interviewed Patsy Stevenson after she was aggressively arrested by the Metropolitan Police.

== Publications ==
Counterfire publishes a free monthly newspaper as well as two weekly email bulletins: Lindsey German's Weekly Briefing and News from the Frontline. Through its publishing imprint, Counterfire has produced several books:

- Rees, John (2010). Strategy and Tactics: How the Left Can Organise to Transform Society. Counterfire. ISBN 978-1907899003.
- Nineham, Chris (2010). Capitalism and Class Consciousness: The Ideas of Georg Lukacs. Counterfire. ISBN 978-1907899010.
- Rees, John (2014). The ABC of Socialism. Counterfire. ISBN 978-1907899034.
- German, Lindsey (2016). Class: Wealth and power in neoliberal Britain. Counterfire. ISBN 978-1907899058.
- German, Lindsey; Nineham, Chris; Meadway, James; Connelly, Katherine (2015). Marx for Today. Counterfire. ISBN 978-1907899041.
- Connelly, Katherine; Graham-Leigh, Elaine; Ismail, Feyzi; German, Lindsey (2016). Marxism and Women's Liberation. Counterfire. ISBN 978-1907899065.
- Alexander, Dominic (2018). The Limits of Keynesianism. Counterfire. ISBN 978-1907899089.
- Rees, John (2019). The Corbyn Project: Dreams and Dangers. Counterfire. ISBN 978-1907899096.
- German, Lindsey (2020). As It Happened: Briefings from two years of turmoil 2017-2019. Counterfire. ISBN 978-1907899102.
- Graham-Leigh, Elaine (2020). Marx and the Climate Crisis. Counterfire. ISBN 978-1907899119.
- Alexander, Dominic (2020). Trotsky in the Bronze Age: Why technology alone does not change society. Counterfire. ISBN 978-1907899126.
- Graham-Leigh, Elaine, ed. (2021). Socialist Explainers: Short answers to big questions. Counterfire. ISBN 978-1907899133.
