= Nineham =

Nineham is a surname. Notable people with the surname include:

- Arthur Nineham (1873–1950), British amateur footballer
- Chris Nineham (born 1962), British political activist
- Dennis Nineham (1921–2016), British theologian and academic
