= People's Assembly Against Austerity =

UK advocacy group

The People's Assembly
- The People's Assembly Against Austerity
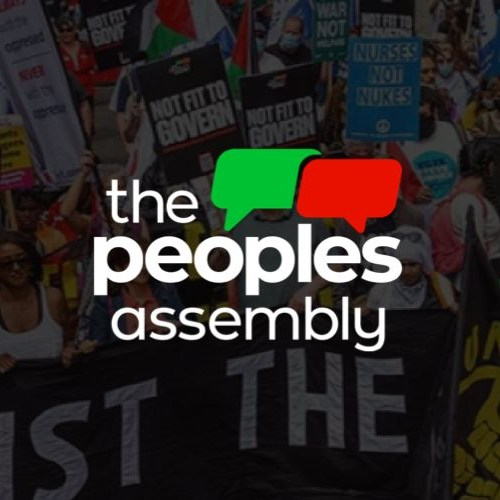
- People's Assembly logo
- Formation: 2013
- Type: Pressure group
- Headquarters: London
- Key people: Steve Turner; Nick McCarthy; Alex Gordon; John Rees; Laura Pidcock; Lindsey German; Ramona McCartney; Fran Heathcote; Paula Peters; Andy Bain
- Website: https://thepeoplesassembly.org.uk/

The People's Assembly Against Austerity (also known as The People's Assembly) is a political organisation based in the United Kingdom that was originally set up to end and reverse the country's government-instituted austerity programme.

The People's Assembly was launched in 2013 to bring together the various progressive left trade unions, campaigns, and activists in a movement against austerity. It aimed to "push the arguments against austerity" that it saw as missing from British politics at that time, and to fight for those people it saw as being hit by Government policies, including low-paid workers, disabled people, unemployed people, the young, black, minority and ethnic groups and women.

Its current National Secretary is former Labour MP Laura Pidcock.

== Aims and objectives ==
The People's Assembly Against Austerity's original aim was "to convene a wide cross-sectional opposition to austerity politics spanning a field from trade unions to student movements". Though the movement didn't put forward a large number of policy positions it advocated higher taxes on the rich.

Social media has been a large part of the organisation's attempt to build a coalition between trade unions and other civil organisations. Women's lived experience of austerity and its economic consequences are widely used by the organisation in constructing arguments, as with disabled people.

== History ==
=== Formation (2013–2015) ===
The movement was originally formed out of a frustration with the Labour Party and its new leader Ed Miliband positioning on austerity and on welfare. It was launched with an open letter published in The Guardian in February 2013, backed by public figures such as Robert Griffiths, Tony Benn, Len McCluskey and Jeremy Corbyn MP.

A press conference was held on 26 March 2013 in London where speakers included Caroline Lucas MP, journalist Owen Jones, comedian Mark Steel, then Labour MP Katy Clark, comedian and disabled activist Francesca Martinez, Steve Turner of Unite and Zita Holbourne representing Black Activists Rising Against the Cuts (BARAC).

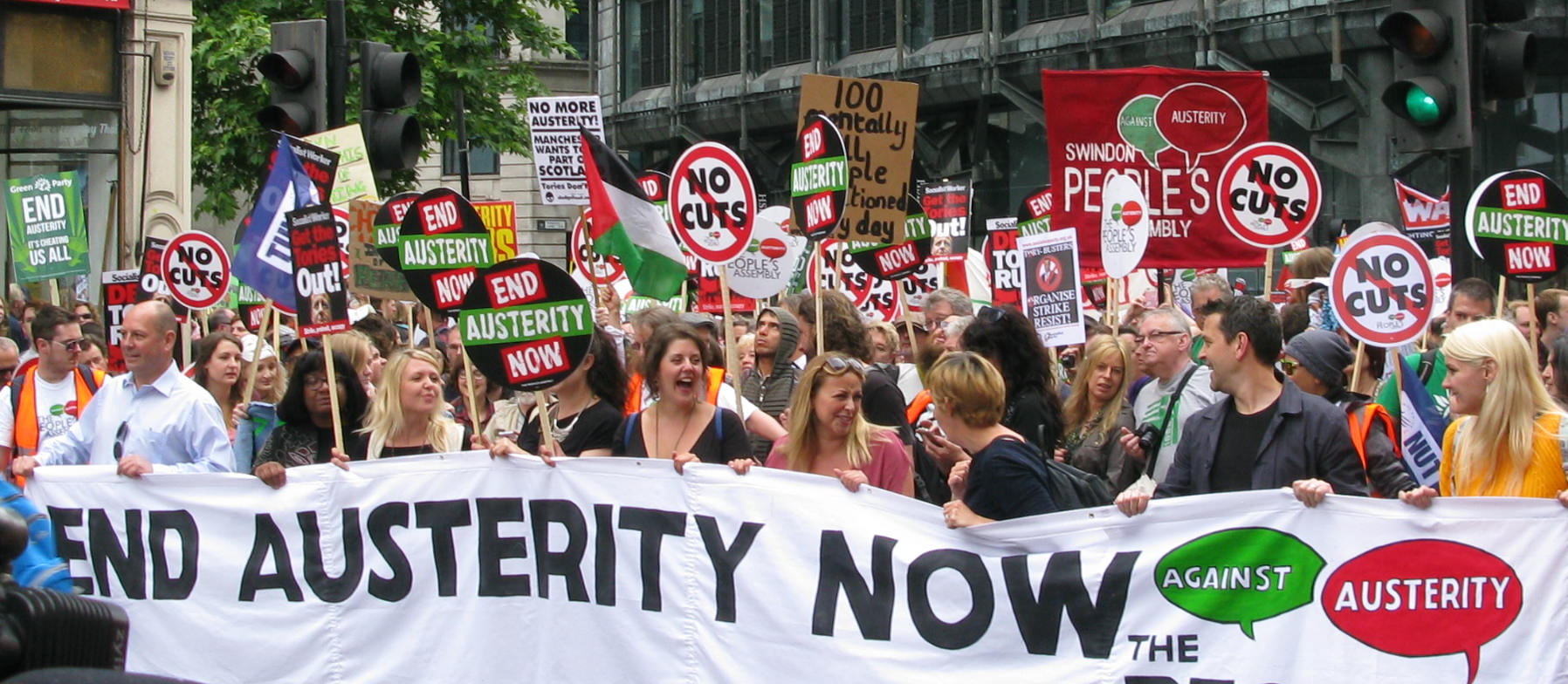
Demonstration organised by the Assembly, 20 June 2015

On 22 June 2013, more than 4,000 people attended a conference at Westminster Central Hall in London. This followed meetings and rallies across the country including Glasgow, Nottingham, Newcastle, Manchester, Sheffield, Bristol, Pembrokeshire, Brighton & Hove, Southend, Derby, Leicester, North London and South East London.

Following localized group discussions held at the London conference in 2013, local activist groups have been forming and holding meetings across the UK, with the aim of uniting and strengthening existing campaign groups in local areas with the People's Assembly movement. Delegations from the regional groups were expected to join a national mass protest outside the Conservative Party conference in Manchester on 29 September 2013 and an organised day of civil disobedience across the UK on 5 November 2013.

In 2014 the People's Assembly established a new forum called the Women's Assembly Against Austerity, after people noted the large male representation of men at committees. The new forum attracted feminist activists from groups like Association of Indian Women, the National Assembly of Women, Abortion Rights, Women Unite, the black student campaign and the CND.

The People's Assembly organised a demonstration which took place on 21 June 2014, marching from outside the BBC Trust's Portland Place offices to Parliament Square. Organizers claimed up to 50,000 demonstrated in central London. Speakers included, among others, comedians Russell Brand, Kate Smurthwaite, Mark Steel and Francesca Martinez, Labour MPs Diane Abbott and Jeremy Corbyn, Green Party MP Caroline Lucas, Lindsey German of the Stop the War Coalition, Kate Hudson from CND, and, then mayor of Tower Hamlets, Lutfur Rahman. Class War, AFed and IWW activists denounced the march during it with placards and banners.

As well as putting on national events, the majority of work is carried out by the local People's Assemblies, which were either founded after the founding People's Assembly, or incorporate pre-existing local anti-cuts groups. These have ranged from People's Question Times, on anti-austerity issues and usually with well known public figures; local demonstrations, regular leafleting, and support for all anti-austerity campaigns in local areas.

In 2015 the first edition of the People's Manifesto was published, articulating anti-austerity policies.

One of the key goals of the People's Assembly movement as published in the Draft Statement is "To make government abandon its austerity programme. If it will not it must be replaced with one that will."

On 20 June 2015, a People's Assembly organised an anti-austerity rally in London, which was attended by thousands of people. Jeremy Corbyn, MP for Islington North spoke at the rally during his campaign to become Labour leader.

=== During Corbyn's leadership in the Labour Party (2015–2019) ===
The success of Corbyn's campaign to become Leader of the Labour party and the rise of Momentum saw the anti-austerity politics of the People's Assembly absorbed into the Labour Party. Momentum then received more funding, more political backing and more media interest than the People's Assembly. The Financial Times argued that the rallies organised by the People's Assembly "sowed the seeds for the rise of Corbynism two years later."

On 16 April 2016, the National People's Assembly led a further national demonstration labelled the "March for Health, Homes, Jobs, Education". More specifically, such causes as a fully funded and publicly owned NHS, ending privatisation, scrapping tuition fees, and ending the marketisation of education. It has been reported that the march was attended by 50,000 to 150,000 protesters, who marched from London's Euston Road to Trafalgar Square.

During the 2017 general election, the People's Assembly operated as a non-partisan campaign group. They created podcasts, crowdfunded billboards targeting the Conservative party, supported the protest song Liar Liar GE2017 and used their presence online to publicise hashtag campaigns such as #ManifestoOfMisery on Twitter.

At the 2018 Conservative Party Conference, then Prime Minister Theresa May declared that "austerity is over" and there would be an increase in public investment. In response to this the People's Assembly launched a tour of the UK called "Britain is Broken" supported by the Daily Mirror and trade unions to cover the impact of austerity measures taken by the government.

In June 2019 the PAAA was involved in nation-wide demonstrations against Donald Trump's visit to the United Kingdom, in association with other social movements.

In September to October 2019 the Conservative government prorogued parliament and received heavy political, legal and grassroots opposition. It prompted protests across the UK with thousands present at each, including international protests composed of both British expats and solidarity protesters. Though the initial protests were organised by Another Europe Is Possible, The People's Assembly organised protests for the first day MPs went into parliament after the summer break.

=== Recent activity (2020–present) ===
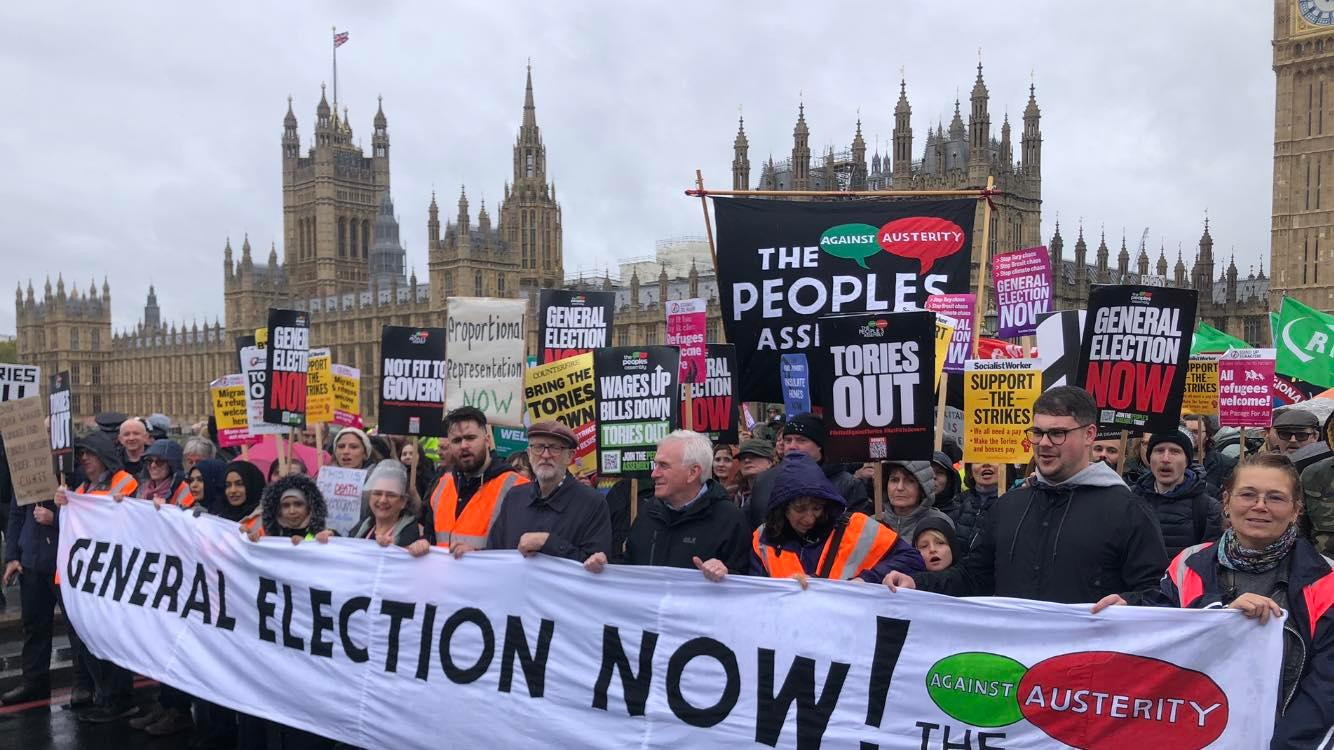
People's Assembly National Demonstration crosses Westminster Bridge with Jeremy Corbyn and John McDonnell leading the march, 5 November 2022

Following a series of prominent political events in the UK – the defeat of the Labour Party at the 2019 general election, the election of Keir Starmer as leader of the Labour Party and the COVID-19 Coronavirus pandemic and the subsequent lockdown to contain the virus – the People's Assembly started to reorganise online mass video calls and meetups, with former Labour MP Laura Pidcock (who became the organisation's National Secretary) and Ken Loach being regulars.

Throughout 2020 there were examples of local People's Assembly groups in England such as Didcot, Cambridge and Calderdale collaborating with other groups to oppose austerity and lack of future investment in communities and campaign on climate change and social justice. This included partnerships with local politicians and groups such as Extinction Rebellion, Stop the War Coalition, Disabled People Against Cuts and Momentum. People's Assembly in Wales during 2020 campaigned for free school meals for primary-age pupils, then in 2022 launched a Health campaign named Our NHS - Born in Wales.

The People's Assembly planned rallies and demonstrations across the country for Saturday 17 October 2020 in protest at the government's handling of coronavirus and what the PAAA believe will be another wave of austerity.

== Organisation ==
=== Support ===
The organisation has been backed by major trade unions and the Trades Union Congress, such as Unite, UNISON, NEU, CWU, FBU, NUT, PCS and RMT. It has also received support from numerous campaigning groups and individuals of political parties, these parties include: the Communist Party of Britain, the Green Party of England and Wales, the Labour Party and Left Unity.

Some from the anarchist movement have been disappointed by the People's Assembly Against Austerity's focus on attempting to shift the policies of the Labour Party to the left.

== See also ==
- Anti-austerity movement in the United Kingdom
