= Michael Lavalette =

British activist (born 1962)

Councillor Michael Lavalette
- Lavalette in 2007

Personal details
- Born: 1962 (age 63–64) Kilmarnock
- Party: Socialist Workers Party (1982-2018); Trade Unionist and Socialist Coalition; Independent (2021-present); Counterfire
- Occupation: Politician; Academic

Michael Lavalette (born 1962) is a British academic specialising in social work. He is also a political activist (involved in the Socialist Workers Party for several decades and now a member of Counterfire) and local politician, elected to council seats in Preston City and Lancashire County Councils for various left-wing formations.

Until retirement he was the Everton Professor of Social and Community Engagement at Liverpool Hope University, formerly having worked at both Liverpool and Central Lancashire universities. He is now Emeritus Professor at Liverpool Hope University and a visiting professor at the University of Bethlehem and the University of West Attica, Athens.

== Academic career and social work activism ==
In the 2000s, along with Chris Jones, Iain Feguson, and Laura Penketh, he was an author of the Social Work manifesto for a new engaged practice and organiser of the Liverpool and Glasgow conferences of the Social Work Action Network (SWAN), and sought to oppose managerialism and privatisation within the social work profession, and to promote social work practice based on principles of social justice. At the end of 2008 the SWAN ran a campaign defending social workers in the aftermath of the Baby P tragedy. Shortly after, along with Iain Ferguson, he wrote a polemical pamphlet called Social Work After Baby P that included contributions from academics, practitioners and senior trade union officers. During the COVID pandemic, Lavalette was instrumental in setting up Social Work Action Network International (SWANI) to bring activist groups together from across the globe.

He is the author, joint author or editor of 30 books and pamphlets.

In March 2021 he was awarded Honorary membership of the General Union for Palestinian Writers in recognition of his writing on, and activism with, Palestinian groups in Britain and the West Bank.

Alongside fellow left-wing academic Iain Ferguson he was the founding editor of the academic social work journal Critical and Radical Social Work, published by Bristol University Press. He retired from the editorship in November 2025 after 14 years in the role.

== Political activism ==
Lavalette originally joined his local Labour Party in North Ayrshire at the age of 16 in 1979, but by January 1981 he had left to join the SWP. In the early 1990s he moved to Preston for work and became politically active in the local labour movement.

In Preston he was the co-ordinator of the local Stop the War Coalition.

He has been involved in solidarity with Palestinian liberation, including a campaign to twin Glasgow University with Birzeit University, a West Bank university, in 1982. In 2003, as a councillor, he led a campaign to twin Preston with Nablus. In 2004 he led a delegation of 34 people from Preston to the West Bank, where the group were the last ever international group to meet President Yasser Arafat.

He was first elected to Preston council as a Socialist Alliance candidate shortly after the Iraq War began in 2003. In 2007, he was re-elected, this time standing for the Respect Party. In the Respect split in 2007 he remained loyal to the SWP and broke with George Galloway. In 2007, he was part of a campaign against academy schools in Preston. In December 2010, Lavalette proposed a motion to Preston City Council calling for opposition to cuts, job losses and privatisations. The motion had the backing of the local trades council and of Preston Against Cuts. Five Labour councillors had voted and spoken in favour of this motion at these meetings. Socialist Worker reported that when it came to the full council meeting however, all the Labour councillors voted against this motion, and for an amendment supporting 'fairer' cuts backed by the Liberals and Tories.

He held his seat until May 2011, in which he stood for Preston Independent Socialists Against the Cuts, losing the seat to Labour. He was re-elected in 2012 as an independent socialist, backed by the SWP.

In March 2018 he left the SWP and joined the revolutionary socialist organisation Counterfire.

He was active in opposition to Israel's actions in the Gaza war.

In the 2024 United Kingdom general election, he stood in Preston as an independent on a pro-Palestine ticket, supported by Counterfire, securing just over 21 per cent of the vote and coming second. During the campaign, he declined to denounce Hamas as a terrorist organization, stating that "when your land is occupied ... people have the right to resist", comparing Hamas' "resistance" to that of the French Resistance during World War II. Lavalette said that, while he did not support any one group himself, "the Palestinians have always been heroic in their right to resist the colonialisation of the their lands".

In January 2025, he alleged that he was "assaulted by a Zionist provocateur" but the police did not act on his complaint.

In May 2025, he was elected to Lancashire County Council, winning Preston Central East from Labour. Declaring "Palestine remains a central issue in British politics... so on May 1 in the local county elections we've decided that we are going to stand to raise the voice of Palestine once more at the elections", he was one of three Preston Independents elected, joining four incumbent "pro-Gaza" Independents. The seven joined a further four Greens to form a grouping, Progressive Lancashire, led by Azhar Ali, that became the official opposition group on the council.

In July 2025 Lavalette was questioned under caution by police over potential Public Order Act offences for a social media post in which he said "There is only one solution: Intifada, Revolution" alongside video footage from a pro-Palestine demonstration held in London. He told a social work website: "In my police interview, I also quoted a number of academic sources, which show that 'intifada' means a 'shaking off' of structures of oppression". The police later confirmed no action was to be taken and he faced no charges.

In Summer 2025, he joined Jeremy Corbyn and Zarah Sultana's Your Party, along with fellow Lancashire County Councillors Almas Razakazi and Yousuf Motala. It was reported that he was banned from the first Your Party conference in November 2025 for allegedly being a member of both Your Party and the SWP. A Your Party source told the New Statesman that he was allowed to attend after speaking with the event organisers.

He is standing in the Your Party CEC elections in 2026 as a Public Officer.

== Electoral history ==
=== 2003 Local Election ===
Lavalette stood in the Preston City Council Elections: Town Centre Ward 2003 as a Socialist Alliance Against the War candidate. George Galloway was alleged to have backed Michael Lavalette in this election, which was one of the charges that led to George Galloway being expelled from the Labour Party. He came first with 546 votes, 37.81%, unseating the Labour Party, whose candidate Musa Ahmed Jiwa came second with 440 votes. The turnout was 1,444 (28%).

=== 2004 European Election ===
In 2004 he was the lead candidate in the Respect list for the 2004 European Election in the North West England region. Respect came ninth, with 24,636 votes (1.2%) and none of its candidates were elected.

=== 2005 General Election ===
In the 2005 United Kingdom general election, he stood as a Respect candidate in Preston coming fourth with 2,318 votes, 6.8% of the vote, saving his deposit. Labour's Mark Hendrick won with 17,210 votes (50.5%).

=== 2007 Local Election ===
Lavalette kept his council seat, Preston Town Centre, with 1179 votes (more than 52%) increasing his majority by over 19%.

Preston City Council Elections: Town Centre ward 2007
Party	Candidate	Votes	%	±%
Respect	Michael Lavalette	1,179	52.3	+14.2
Labour	Salim Desai	717	31.8	+1.1
Liberal Democrats	Helen Greaves	206	9.2	−6.1
Conservative	Susan Horn	87	3.9	−12.0
Green	Rupert Wadsworth	63	2.8	N/A
Majority		462	20.45	+19.11
Rejected ballots		7		
Turnout		2,259	46.4	
Respect hold		Swing		

=== 2011 Local Election ===
In May 2011 he lost his seat to Labour. He stood as a Trade Unionist and Socialist Coalition candidate because the SWP had left Respect in 2007 and since joined TUSC.

Preston City Council Elections: Town Centre ward, 2011
Party	Candidate	Votes	%	±%
Labour	Yakub Patel	964	45.7	+13.9
TUSC	Michael Lavalette	840	39.8	−12.5
Conservative	Jonathan Cooper	305	14.5	+10.6
Majority		124	5.9	
Rejected ballots		17		
Turnout		2,109	38.9	
Labour gain from TUSC		Swing		

=== 2012 Local Election ===
Lavalette successfully stood as an independent in 2012, again in Town Centre ward.

Preston City Council Elections: Town Centre ward 2012
Party	Candidate	Votes	%	±%
Independent	Michael Lavalette	967	48.5	N/A
Labour	Salim Desai	872	43.8	+2.9
Conservative	David Treasure	154	7.7	−5.2
Majority		95		
Turnout		1,993		
Independent gain from Labour		Swing		

=== 2024 general election ===
In March 2024, Blog Preston and Counterfire reported that Lavalette would stand as an independent candidate for Preston in the next general election as a part of the No Ceasefire, No Vote movement.

At election hustings organised by the local press in June 2024, candidates were asked if he would denounce Hamas "as a terrorist organisation", he answered no; asked whether he would instead denounce the actions of Hamas on 7 October 2023, he again said no: "You had the right to resist in the Second World War and the French Resistance [and also] the Yugoslav resistance, the Italian resistance, the Greek resistance – and the Palestinians have the right to fight against their own dispossession... history did not start on [7 October]". He referred to attacks on Palestinians, including one in Huwara in 2023 in which he said people were "burnt out [of] their homes": "There’s a context to all this."

General election 2024: Preston
Party	Candidate	Votes	%	±%
Labour Co-op	Mark Hendrick	14,006	35.0	–22.3
Independent	Michael Lavalette	8,715	21.8	N/A
Reform	James Elliot	5,738	14.3	+10.1
Conservative	Trevor Hart	5,212	13.0	–16.8
Liberal Democrats	Neil Darby	3,195	8.0	+1.2
Green	Isabella Metcalf-Riener	1,751	4.4	+2.4
Independent	Yousuf Bhailok	891	2.2	N/A
Rejoin EU	Joseph O'Meachair	216	0.5	N/A
Alliance for Democracy and Freedom	David Brooks	145	0.4	N/A
UKIP	Derek Kileen	124	0.3	N/A
Majority		5,291	13.2	
Turnout		40,132	51.9	–7.6
Labour Co-op hold		Swing		

=== 2025 Lancashire County Council Election 2025 ===
In May 2025 Lavalette stood as one of four Preston Independent candidates.

Preston City Council Elections: Preston Central East
Party	Candidate	Votes	%	±%
Independent	Michael Lavalette	1,782	47.8	
Labour	Frank De Molfetta	884	23.7	
Reform	Darrin Gregans	556	14.9	
Liberal Democrats	George Kulbacki	204	5.4	
Conservative	Al-Yasa Khan	189	5.1	
Green	Callum Taylor	107	2.9	
Rejected ballots		3		
Turnout		3,722	30.7%	{{{change}}}
Independent gain from Labour		Swing	{{{swing}}}	

== Published works ==
- The Forgotten Workforce: Scottish Children at Work (1991) (Glasgow, Scottish Low Pay Unit) ISBN 1 872466 01 X
- Child employment in the capitalist labour market (1994) (Aldershot, Ashgate) ISBN 1 85628 600 2
- Solidarity on the waterfront: the Liverpool lock out of 1995/96 (with Jane Kennedy) (1996) (Liverpool, Liver Press) ISBN 1 871 201 06 3
- Social policy: a conceptual and theoretical introduction (edited with Alan Pratt) (1996) (London, Sage) ISBN 0-803-97532-5
- Anti-racism and social welfare (edited with Laura Penketh and Chris Jones) (1998) (Aldershot, Ashgate) ISBN 1-84014-507-2
- A thing of the past?: child labour in Britain in the nineteenth and twentieth centuries (editor) (1999) (Liverpool, Liverpool University Press) ISBN 0-312-21811-7
- Child labor: a world history companion (with Sandy Hobbs and Jim McKechnie) (1999) (New York, ABC-CLIO) ISBN 0-87436-956-8
- Class struggle and social welfare (edited with Gerry Mooney) (2000) (London, Routledge) ISBN 0415201047
- Social Policy: A conceptual and theoretical introduction (second edition) (Edited with Alan Pratt) (2001) (London, Sage) ISBN 0-7619-6952-7
- Leadership and social movements (edited with Colin Barker and Alan Johnson) (Manchester, MUP) (2001) ISBN 0-7190-5902-X
- Rethinking social welfare: a critical perspective (with Iain Ferguson and Gerry Mooney) (2002) (London, Sage) ISBN 0-7619-6417-7
- Children, welfare and the state (edited with Barry Goldson and Jim McKechnie) (2002) (London, Sage) ISBN 0761972331
- Globalisation, global justice and social work (edited with Iain Ferguson and Elizabeth Whitmore) (2005) (London, Sage) ISBN 0415325382
- Social Policy: Theories, concepts and issues (Third Edition) (Edited with Alan Pratt) (2006) (London, Sage) ISBN 1-4129-0170-7
- George Lansbury and the rebel councillors of Poplar (foreword by George Galloway) (2006) (London, Bookmarks) ISBN 1-898877-44-0
- International Social Work and the Radical Tradition (edited with Iain Ferguson) (2007) (Birmingham, Venture Press) ISBN 978-1-86178-076-8
- Social Work After Baby P: Issues debates and Alternative Perspectives(Edited with Iain Ferguson) (2009) (Liverpool, Liverpool Hope University Press) ISBN 978-1-898749-02-8
- Radical Social Work Today (Editor) (2011) (Bristol, Policy Press) ISBN 9781847428172
- Social Work in Extremis (edited with Vassilios Ioakimidis) (2011) (Bristol, Policy Press) ISBN 978-1-84742-718-2
- Voices From the West Bank (with Chris Jones) (2011) (London, Bookmarks) ISBN 978-1-905192-82-3
- Capitalism and Sport: Politics, Protest, People and Play (editor) (2013) (London, Bookmarks) ISBN 978-1909026308
- “Race, Racism and Social Work” (edited with Laura Penketh)(2014) (Policy Press, Bristol)ISBN 978-1447307075
- “Marketisation and the Crisis in Adult Social Care” (with I. Ferguson)(2014) (Bristol, Policy Press)ISBN 978-1447316169
- “Mark our words – we will rise: Episodes in Preston’s Radical history” (edited with P. Marsden)(2014) (Preston PSHG){{|
- “Schools Out! The hidden history of school student strikes in Britain” (with S. Cunningham)(2016) (London, Bookmarks)ISBN 978-1910885185
- “Global Social Work in Political Context” (with I. Ferguson and V. Ioakimidis)(2018) (Bristol, Policy Press)ISBN 978-1447322702
- “What is the future of social work?” (Editor)(2019)(Bristol Policy Press)ISBN 978-1447340829
- “Social Work and Covid19” (with I. Ferguson and V. Ioakimidis) (2020) (Bristol Policy Press)ISBN 978-1447360360
- “Palestinian Cultures of Resistance” (2021)(London, Redwords)ISBN 978-1912926015
