= Susan Michie =

British psychologist (born 1955)

Susan Michie FBPsS FAcSS FMedSci FBA
- Born: Susan Fiona Dorinthea Michie; 19 June 1955 (age 71); St Pancras, London, England
- Education: University College, Oxford; King's College London
- Spouses: Andrew Murray (m. 1981; div. 1997); Robert West (m. 2009)
- Children: 3
- Scientific career
- Fields: Experimental psychology, clinical psychology, developmental psychology, health psychology
- Workplaces: University College London
- Thesis: Cognitive uncertainty and number development in young children (1982)
- Doctoral advisor: Peter Bryant

Susan Fiona Dorinthea Michie (born 19 June 1955) is a British academic, clinical psychologist, and professor of health psychology, director of the Centre for Behaviour Change and head of the Health Psychology Research Group, all at University College London. She was an advisor to the British Government via the SAGE advisory group on matters concerning behavioural compliance with government regulations during the COVID-19 pandemic. In 2022, she was appointed chair of the World Health Organisation’s (WHO) Technical Advisory Group on Behavioural Insights and Sciences for Health.

== Early life ==
Born in St Pancras, London, Michie is the daughter of the biologist Dame Anne McLaren and computer scientist Donald Michie, and sister of the economist Jonathan Michie.

Michie obtained a BA in experimental psychology from University College, Oxford in 1976, an MPhil in clinical psychology from the Institute of Psychiatry in 1978, and a DPhil in developmental psychology from University College, Oxford in 1982. She is a chartered clinical psychologist and a chartered health psychologist, and a fellow of the British Psychological Society.

== Career ==
As a clinical psychologist she worked with adults and families on topics covering antenatal care, genetic counselling and occupational stress. Her later career interests have been in designing and evaluating methods of behavioural change, especially in relation to wellbeing and health improvement.

Michie worked as a clinical psychologist with children and families at the Royal Free Hospital, London. In 1989, she joined the Royal Free School of Medicine’s Health Psychology Unit as a senior research fellow in clinical health psychology. She developed a psychology service for staff, an organisational consultancy service for managers and taught a variety of professions. Her research focused on the areas of antenatal care and screening, and occupational stress in health care staff and students.

In 1993, Michie moved to the Psychology and Genetics Research Group, King's College London where she conducted research into the process and outcome of genetic counselling, public and professional attitudes towards genetic testing, informed choice and decision making about prenatal screening and genetic testing, and the psychological impact of predictive genetic testing. She continued her clinical work, consultancy and research at the Royal Free Hospital’s Occupational Health and Safety Unit part-time.

In 2002, Michie joined the Psychology Department of University College London (UCL), where she is Professor of Health Psychology. She is director of UCL’s Centre for Behaviour Change and of its Health Psychology Research Group.

Her current research includes developing methodologies for designing and evaluating theory-based interventions to change behaviour, and advancing scientific knowledge about, and applications of, behaviour change interventions. She leads the Human Behaviour-Change Project funded by the Wellcome Trust.

Michie has served as president of the European Health Psychology Society and chair of the British Psychological Society’s Division of Health Psychology.

In July 2022, Michie was appointed chair of the WHO’s Behavioural Advisory Group. She will advise the WHO on how to increase adherence to vaccination campaigns and other initiatives that influence national health policy. Some social media users expressed concern over her hiring due to Michie's stances during the COVID epidemic.

=== Recognition ===
Michie was elected a Fellow of the British Psychological Society in 2001, the Academy of Social Sciences in 2010, the Academy of Medical Sciences in 2017, the British Academy in 2021, the European Health Psychology Society, and the US Society of Behavioral Medicine and Academy of Behavioral Medicine Research.

In 2019, Michie was named winner of the British Psychological Society Research Board’s Lifetime Achievement Award for her world-leading work creating a coherent language of behaviour change.

=== Government advisor ===
In 2009, Michie became a member of the Scientific Advisory Group for Emergencies (SAGE) and convened its subgroup, the Scientific Pandemic Influenza Behaviour group. In 2020, she became a participant in the COVID-19 SAGE's Scientific Pandemic Insights group on Behaviour (SPI-B). She also sits on the Independent SAGE committee, chaired by Sir David King.

Michie frequently contributed to national news media during the COVID-19 pandemic as an expert in behaviour change, notably in May 2020 when a government advisor left the city and thus broke the government's COVID-19 rules.

== Personal life ==
Michie was married from 1981 to 1997 to the trade union official Andrew Murray and has three children.

She married psychologist Robert West, Emeritus Professor at University College London, in 2009.

Michie is a member of the Communist Party of Britain and was also a member of its predecessor, the Communist Party of Great Britain. In March 2018, she spoke at a public meeting saying that communists should be "working full tilt" for the election of Jeremy Corbyn as prime minister. She made a £14,000 donation to Labour under Corbyn's leadership. She has stated that her political positions are unrelated to her scientific advice.
