= Socialist Review =

British socialist magazine (1950–2021)

- Socialist Review, January 2010
- Frequency: Monthly
- First issue: November 1950
- Final issue: January 2021
- Country: United Kingdom
- Language: English
- Website: socialistreview.org.uk

The Socialist Review was a monthly magazine of the British Socialist Workers Party (SWP). It was published in a print edition and later had an online version.

== Original publication: 1950–1962 ==
The Socialist Review was established in 1950 as the main publication of the Socialist Review Group (SRG). It began as a duplicated magazine, the parent group only being able to afford to have it printed from 1954 onwards. In its last years, the magazine lost its central importance to the SRG due to the launch in 1960 of a journal, International Socialism, and in 1961 of a newspaper, Industrial Worker, which then became Labour Worker and subsequently the Socialist Worker. Socialist Review was discontinued in 1962 – the year in which the SRG became the International Socialists (IS).

== Monthly magazine: 1978–2005 ==
In 1978, Socialist Review magazine was revived by the Socialist Workers Party (as the IS had become known). The monthly publication was renamed Socialist Worker Review in the 1990s, but later went back to its original title.

In 2003, the selling of the SWP's in-house printing press (for the stated reason that it was outdated technology too expensive to maintain) led to the magazine contracting with Warners Midlands plc for printing services. This opened up the opportunity of full colour throughout and a more professional appearance. These stylistic improvements helped the magazine push for expanded readership outside the ranks of the SWP. The final issue in this format, number 302, was published in December 2005.

=== Editors ===
Among the editors of SR in the 2000s were Stop the War Coalition organisers Chris Nineham and Lindsey German. Peter Morgan was editor from June 2004 to October 2005.

== Supplement to Socialist Worker: 2006–2007 ==
At the SWP conference in January 2006, a plan was put forth to radically change the format of Socialist Review, turning it into a monthly supplement for Socialist Worker, though retaining the cover price so it could continue to be sold separately. The expressed reason for the change was, "The new magazine would draw upon the strengths of both Socialist Worker and Socialist Review and will use the better sale and distribution of the paper to reach a wider audience." The first issue in this format appeared in February 2006.

== Monthly magazine: 2007–2021 ==
Socialist Review reverted to being a separate magazine in May 2007, edited first by Judith Orr, and then Sally Campbell. Regular writers included Mark Serwotka, Billy Hayes and Lindsey German. After the relaunch, it featured interviews with figures such as Naomi Klein, George Galloway, Tony Benn, Tom Morello and Howard Zinn, and articles by Francis Beckett and István Mészáros. The final issue appeared in January 2021.
