= Harry Whyte =

Scottish journalist and communist activist

- Born: Harry Otter Whyte; 1907; Edinburgh, Scotland
- Died: 1960 (aged 52–53); Istanbul, Turkey
- Occupations: Journalist, activist

Harry Otter Whyte (1907–1960) was a Scottish journalist and communist activist who worked as a correspondent in the Soviet Union during the 1930s. He is best known for writing a letter entitled "Can a Homosexual Be a Member of the Communist Party?", addressed to Soviet leader Joseph Stalin.

== Biography ==
Born in Edinburgh, Whyte was the son of William Whyte, a house painter, and Harriet Otter. He left George Heriot's School at the age of 16 to work for the Edinburgh Evening News. In 1927, he joined the Independent Labour Party, and in 1931 he became a member of the Communist Party of Great Britain (CPGB). He was homosexual.

In 1932, Whyte moved to the Soviet Union after being invited to work as a journalist for The Moscow News and as a correspondent for the Daily Worker.

Following the Soviet government's recriminalisation of homosexuality, Whyte wrote a lengthy letter to Joseph Stalin entitled "Can a Homosexual Be a Member of the Communist Party?". In it, he argued that homosexuality was not a "bourgeois disease", but rather a characteristic of a minority that posed no threat to the proletariat. He also compared homophobia with other forms of systemic oppression. Stalin reportedly dismissed Whyte's political arguments, filed the letter, and handwritten the remark "An idiot and a degenerate" on its first page.

In 1935, Whyte was expelled from the Communist Party of Great Britain and the Soviet Union. He returned to continental Europe and became involved in anti-fascist organisations, supporting the Second Spanish Republic against Francisco Franco.

In 1938, Whyte moved to Morocco to work as a correspondent for a news agency. It has been suggested that he may also have been involved in monitoring German and Italian nationals on behalf of the British Consulate in Tangier. He was soon expelled from the territory by the authorities because of his homosexuality. In 1941, he attempted to return to the Soviet Union but was denied a visa. In December of that year, he enlisted in the Royal Navy.

After the Second World War, Whyte worked for the British newspapers Daily Express, Daily Herald, and Socialist Review, before subsequently joining the news agency Reuters in Turkey. He died in Istanbul in 1960, aged 53.
