= Dennis Nineham =

British theologian and academic

The Reverend Canon Dennis Nineham

Warden of Keble College, Oxford
- In office 1969–1979
- Preceded by: Austin Farrer
- Succeeded by: Christopher Ball

Regius Professor of Divinity University of Cambridge
- In office 1964–1969
- Preceded by: Edward Craddock Ratcliffe
- Succeeded by: Geoffrey Hugo Lampe

Personal details
- Born: Dennis Eric Nineham; 27 September 1921 Southampton, England
- Died: 9 May 2016 (aged 94) Shipton-under-Wychwood, England
- Spouse: Ruth Miller (m. 1946; died 2016)
- Children: 4, including Chris
- Education: King Edward VI School, Southampton
- Alma mater: The Queen's College, Oxford; Lincoln Theological College
- Profession: Theologian, clergyman

Dennis Eric Nineham (27 September 1921 – 9 May 2016) was a British theologian and academic, who served as Warden of Keble College, Oxford, from 1969 to 1979. He held chairs in theology at the universities of London, Cambridge, and Bristol.

== Early life and education ==
Nineham was born in Southampton on 27 September 1921. He was educated at King Edward VI School, then a grammar school. He studied Literae Humaniores (classics) and theology at The Queen's College, Oxford. He graduated from the University of Oxford with a first class honours Bachelor of Arts degree in 1943. He then entered Lincoln Theological College, an Anglican theological college, to undertake a year's training in preparation for the ordained ministry of the Church of England.

== Career ==
=== Ordained ministry ===
Nineham was ordained in the Church of England as a deacon in 1944 and as a priest in 1945. He then served as Assistant Chaplain at Queen's College, Oxford. In 1946, he was elected a fellow and appointed as the College Chaplain.

During his time at the University of Bristol, Nineham was an honorary canon of Bristol Cathedral.

=== Academic career ===
He was appointed professor of Biblical and historical theology at King's College London in 1954, becoming professor of divinity at the University of London in 1958. In 1964, he was appointed Regius Professor of Divinity at the University of Cambridge, a post held in conjunction with a fellowship at Emmanuel College. He returned to Oxford in 1969, as warden of Keble College, a post that he held until 1979; he was appointed to an honorary fellowship of Keble in the following year, and to an honorary fellowship of Queen's in 1991. Between 1980 and 1986, he was professor of theology and head of the theology department at the University of Bristol; he was also an honorary canon of Bristol Cathedral for this period.

His publications include The Study of Divinity (1960), The Gospel of Saint Mark (1963), The Use and Abuse of the Bible (1976) and Christianity Mediaeval and Modern (1993). He edited various theological works, contributed to others, including The Myth of God Incarnate (1977), and made a number of television appearances, including as part of the controversial Channel 4 series, Jesus: The Evidence in 1984.

== Family ==
Nineham married Ruth Corfield Miller in 1946. They had four children, including Chris Nineham, who went on to become a political activist and deputy leader of the Stop The War Coalition.

Nineham died from complications of heart disease at a care home in Shipton-under-Wychwood, Oxfordshire, on 9 May 2016, at the age of 94, six weeks after his wife's death.
