= John Rees (activist) =

British political activist and historian (born 1957)

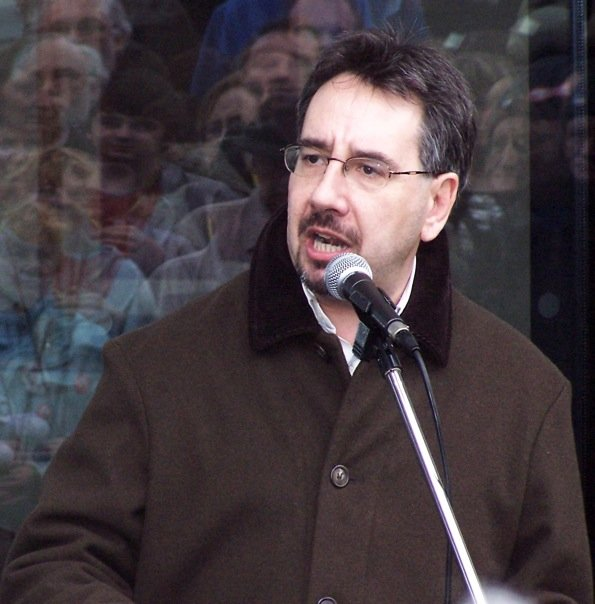
- Rees at a demonstration in 2008 against Condoleezza Rice in Liverpool.
- Born: 1957 (age 68–69); Wiltshire, England
- Occupations: Academic, author, journalist
- Known for: Politics
- Political party: Socialist Workers Party (1980s–2010)
- Partner: Lindsey German

John Rees (born 1957) is a British political activist, historian, author, editor, and broadcast journalist who is a national officer of the Stop the War Coalition, and a founding member of the Marxist organisation Counterfire. He was a former leader of the Socialist Workers Party and was involved in Respect – The Unity Coalition. He has written and edited more than a dozen books, including The Algebra of Revolution, Imperialism and Resistance, Timelines: A Political History of the Modern World, and A People's History of London (co-authored with his partner Lindsey German). In 2014 he was named a visiting research fellow at Goldsmiths, University of London. He also produces television documentaries and presents current affairs programmes for the Islam Channel.

== Early life and education ==
John Rees was born into a working-class family in the town of Melksham in Wiltshire, England. His father was from South Wales, and was a Labour Party member and trade unionist. Both of John's parents worked at the Avon Tyre plant. His father then obtained a job at Westinghouse Brake and Signal, and the family settled in Chippenham, where John was brought up and educated.

His first academic degree was a Bachelor of Arts in Politics from Portsmouth Polytechnic in 1978. He subsequently undertook research on Hegel and Marx at Hull University under Dr (now Lord) Bhikhu Parekh. The result of that research, The Algebra of Revolution, was published by Routledge in 1998. When Georg Lukacs' unknown manuscript "Tailism and the Dialectic" was discovered and published by Verso Books in 2000, Rees provided the introduction to the volume. In 2014 he obtained a Doctor of Philosophy degree from Goldsmiths, University of London. He wrote his thesis on the role of the Levellers in the English Revolution.

== Politics ==
In the early 1980s, Rees was a national executive member of the National Union of Students. He is a former leading member of the Socialist Workers Party (SWP), and served on its Central Committee. He organised the SWP's annual Marxism festival from 1982–1983 and again from 1992–2002. For ten years he was editor of the quarterly journal International Socialism.

He is co-founder and national officer for the Stop the War Coalition, and has been a principal organiser of all its marches, including the massive demonstration ("the biggest demonstration in British political history") on 15 February 2003 against the impending Iraq War. He stated, "Socialists should unconditionally stand with the oppressed against the oppressor, even if the people who run the oppressed country are undemocratic and persecute minorities, like Saddam Hussein." At the same time, Rees advocated an unrelenting struggle against pro-Western dictators and, to that end, became vice president (Europe) of the Cairo Anti-war Conference, which rallied opposition forces against the Mubarak dictatorship in Egypt.

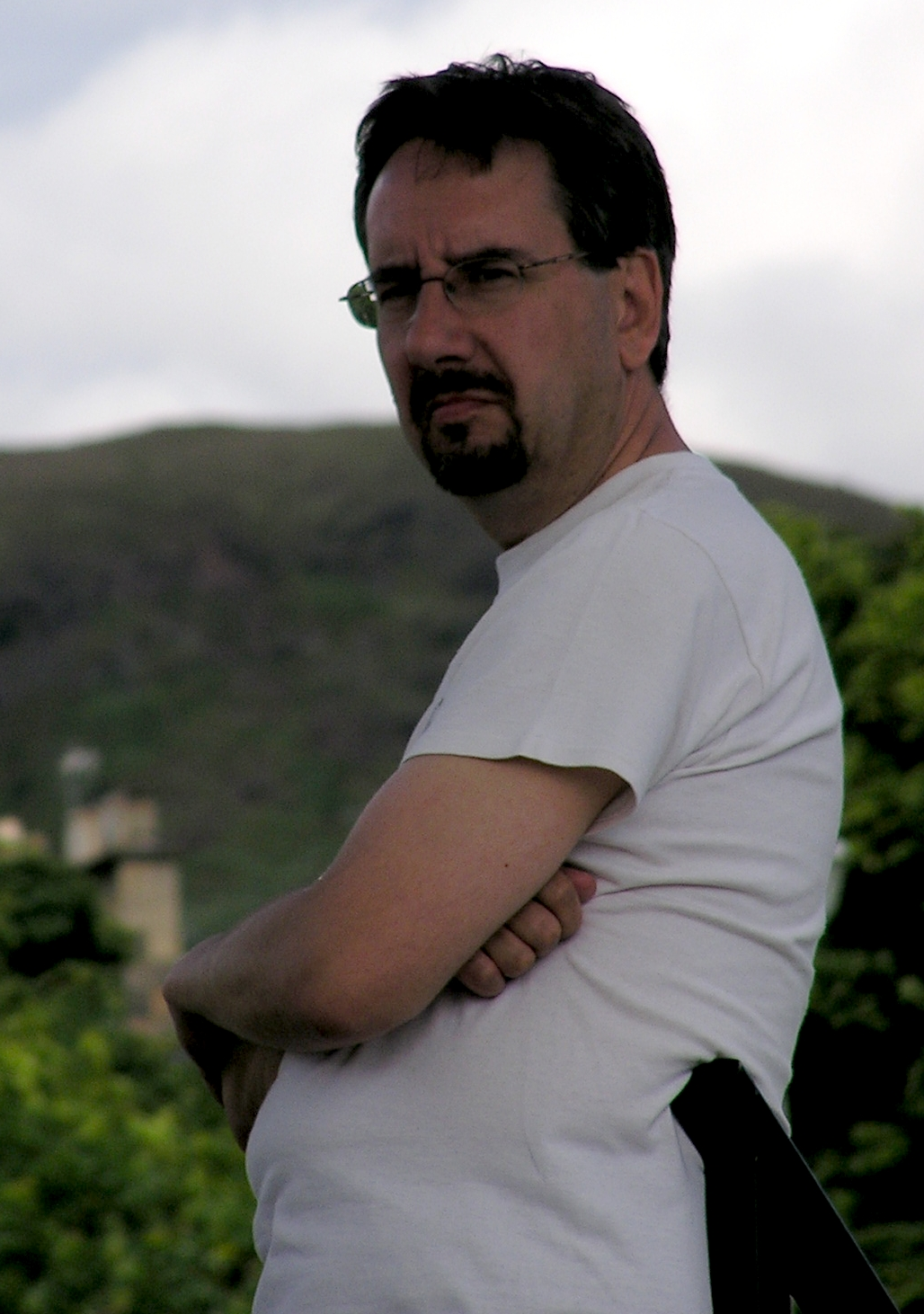
At the Make Poverty History rally in Edinburgh, 2 July 2005

He was at the top of Respect – The Unity Coalition's list in the West Midlands region for the 2004 European election and the Respect candidate for the Birmingham Hodge Hill by-election. He also stood for Respect in the 2006 local election in the Bethnal Green South ward of Tower Hamlets in East London, where he came second to Labour. Rees was not selected by the SWP Central Committee to be on the slate for re-election and did not stand independently at the January 2009 conference. Shortly after his partner Lindsey German resigned from the SWP in 2010, Rees and 41 other members followed; they were disenchanted with the party's direction, internal regime, and approach to united fronts (18 others who had resigned in weeks prior also supported the resignations).

Rees' 2012 book, A People's History of London (co-authored with Lindsey German), recounts the history of London radicalism. It documents working (or lower) class struggles in the city from the ancient Romans to the present day. Jerry White in The Guardian wrote: "Those who continue to uphold London's living traditions of protest will be able to take heart from this fresh and welcome look at the city's history." White described the book as "a very selective people's history" which does not cover the bombings committed by the IRA, or by Islamists on 7 July 2005. Jo Lo Dicio criticized the book in The Independent on Sunday, saying: "Had these two been political pamphleteers through the ages, one doubts many revolutionary sparks would ever have been lit."

A book (based on his doctoral research) on the Levellers and the English Revolution was published by Verso in 2016. Rees is a founding member of the left-wing organisation Counterfire, for which he has written two short books, Strategy and Tactics (2010) and (with Joseph Daher) The People Demand: A Short History of the Arab Revolutions (2011). Rees participated in and reported on the Egyptian revolution in 2011 about which he made two TV documentaries, Inside the Egyptian Revolution and Egypt in Revolution. For the Islam Channel, he wrote and presented the political history documentary series Timeline, and was also a presenter of The Report and Politics and Media current affairs programmes. He has appeared as a political commentator in Ken Loach's The Spirit of '45 and in Amir Amarani's We Are Many.

In early 2013, Rees was a founder and organising committee member of the newly launched People's Assembly Against Austerity. In September of that year, Iain Dale and a panel for The Daily Telegraph placed Rees in position 85 in a list of the 100 most influential British left-wingers.

In 2016, Rees toured the UK to support Jeremy Corbyn's bid to become prime minister.

== Selected works ==
=== Articles ===
- "Trotsky and the Dialectic of History" International Socialism, no. 47, Summer 1990, pp. 113–135.
- "In Defence of October" International Socialism, no. 52, Autumn 1991.
- "Engels' Marxism" International Socialism, no. 65, Winter 1994.
- "The Class Struggle Under New Labour" International Socialism, no. 75, July 1997.
- "The Return of Marx?" International Socialism, no. 79, July 1998.
- "The Socialist Revolution and the Democratic Revolution" International Socialism, no. 83, Summer 1999.
- "Tony Cliff: Theory and Practice" International Socialism, no. 87, Summer 2000.
- "Socialism in the 21st century" International Socialism, no. 100, Autumn 2003.

=== Books ===
- Socialism and War (1991) ISBN 978-9333115858
- Marxism and the New Imperialism (1994) (editor and contributor) ISBN 0-906224-81-0
- The ABC of Socialism (1994) ISBN 0-906224-96-9
- In Defence of October: A Debate on the Russian Revolution (with others including Robin Blackburn) (1997) ISBN 1-898876-28-2
- The Algebra of Revolution: The Dialectic and the Classical Marxist Tradition (1998) ISBN 0-415-19877-1
- Essays on Historical Materialism (1998) (editor) ISBN 1-898876-38-X
- Imperialism (Globalisation, the State and War) (2001) ISBN 978-1898876823
- Imperialism and Resistance (2006) ISBN 978-0415346764
- Strategy and Tactics: How the Left Can Organise to Transform Society (2010) ISBN 978-1907899003
- The People Demand: A Short History of the Arab Revolutions (with Joseph Daher) (2011) ISBN 978-1907899027
- Timelines: A Political History of the Modern World (2012) ISBN 978-0415691031
- A People's History of London (with Lindsey German) (2012) ISBN 978-1844678556
- The Leveller Revolution: Radical Political Organisation in England, 1640-1650 (2016) ISBN 978-1784783884
- John Lilburne and the Levellers: Reappraising the Roots of English Radicalism 400 Years On (2017) (editor) ISBN 978-1138926516
- The Fiery Spirits: Popular Protest, Parliament and the English Revolution (2025) ISBN 978-1839763151
