= Andrew Murray (trade unionist) =

British trade union activist

Special Political Advisor for the Leader of the Opposition
- In office 26 February 2018 – 18 February 2020
- Leader: Jeremy Corbyn
- Preceded by: Office established
- Succeeded by: Anneliese Midgley

Chair of the Stop the War Coalition
- In office 12 September 2015 – 12 October 2016
- Deputy: Chris Nineham
- Preceded by: Jeremy Corbyn
- Succeeded by: Murad Qureshi
- In office 21 September 2001 – 14 June 2011
- President: Tony Benn
- Deputy: Chris Nineham
- Preceded by: Position established
- Succeeded by: Jeremy Corbyn

Chief of Staff of Unite the Union
- In office 1 January 2011 – 26 February 2018
- General Secretary: Len McCluskey

Personal details
- Born: Andrew Philip Drummond-Murray
- Party: Labour (2016–present)
- Other political affiliations: CPGB (1976–1991); CPB (1995–2016)
- Spouse(s): Susan Michie (1981–1997); Anna Kruthoffer (2003–present)
- Relations: Arthur Hope, 2nd Baron Rankeillour (maternal grandfather)
- Parent(s): Peter Drummond-Murray of Mastrick; Hon. Barbara Mary Hope
- Education: Worth School
- Occupation: Trade union official
- Committees: General Council of the Trades Union Congress (2011–present); Executive Committee of the Communist Party of Britain (2000–2004, 2008–2011)

Andrew Philip Drummond-Murray, commonly known as Andrew Murray, is a British trade union and Labour Party official and activist. Murray was seconded from Unite the Union to Labour headquarters for the 2017 United Kingdom general election, subsequently becoming an adviser to Jeremy Corbyn from 2018 to 2020.

Born into an aristocratic Scottish family, Murray began his career as a journalist and later became a senior official for various trade unions. Murray was chair of the Stop the War Coalition from its formation in 2001 until June 2011 and again from September 2015 to 2016. After forty years in the Communist Party of Great Britain (CPGB) and then the Communist Party of Britain (CPB), he joined Labour towards the end of 2016.

Murray is a contributor to the Morning Star and Tribune.

== Biography ==
=== Education and journalism ===
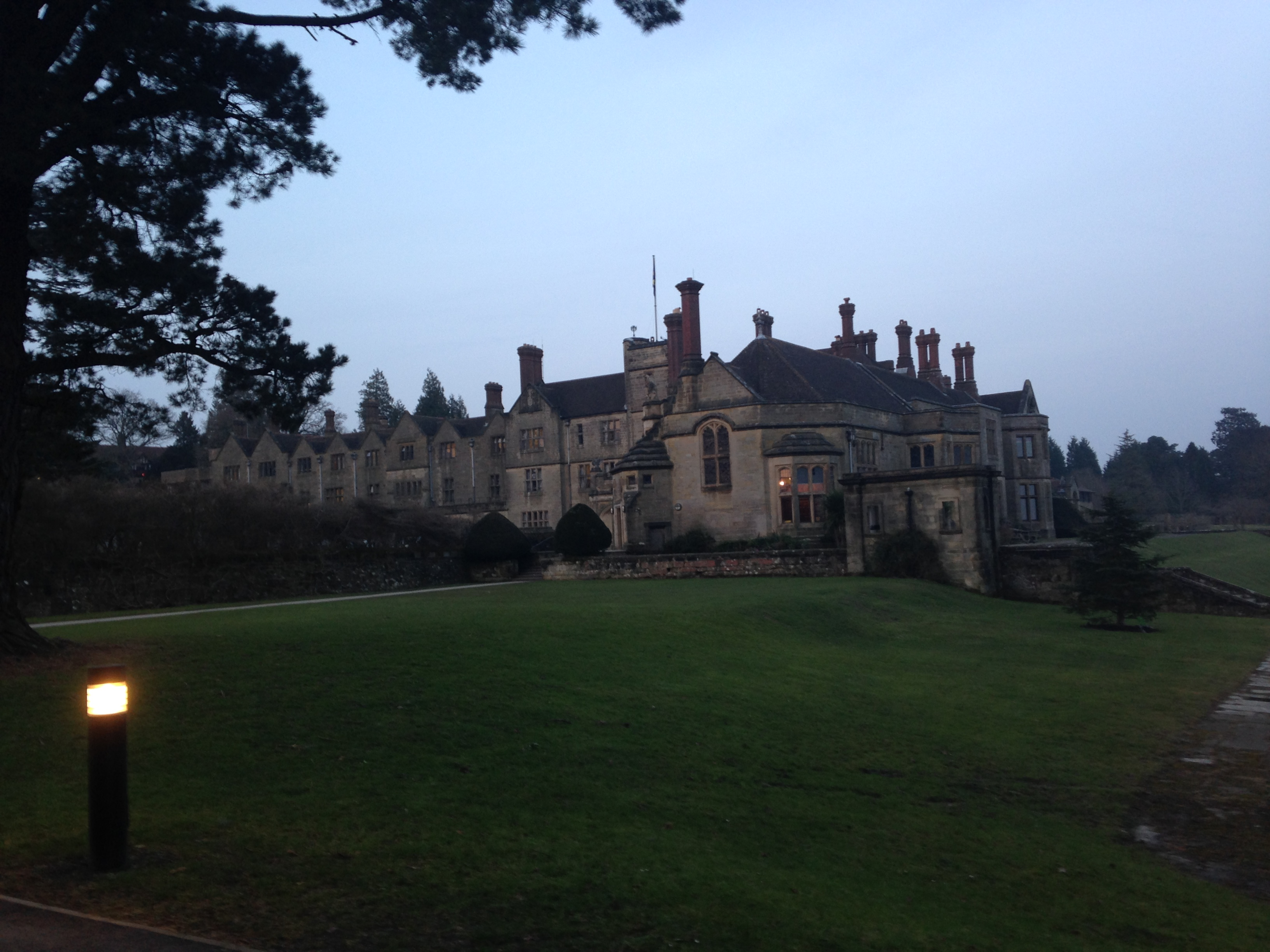
Worth School

Murray was born in 1958 to Peter Drummond-Murray of Mastrick, a stockbroker and banker who was Slains Pursuivant from 1981 to 2009, and The Honourable Barbara Mary Hope, daughter of former Conservative MP and governor of the Madras Presidency in British India from 1940 to 1946 Lord Rankeillour. He was educated at Worth School, a Benedictine independent boarding school in Sussex. Murray left school at 16 with 4 'O' levels.

After working as a messenger at Reader's Digest and a copy boy for the International Herald Tribune, he undertook journalism training at the Sussex Express. Murray was appointed as a parliamentary lobby correspondent at the age of 19. In this post, he "[marched] with a million Leningraders to mark the 60th anniversary of the October Revolution in 1977" and was reportedly the first journalist at the scene when Airey Neave was assassinated in 1979 by the Irish National Liberation Army. He was also a Morning Star journalist, a publication to which he still contributes, and worked for the Soviet RIA Novosti news agency. Until 2013, he was an occasional contributor to The Guardian.

=== Trade union roles ===
At the Transport and General Workers Union, an organisation for which Murray worked from 1987 to 1998 and again from 2003, he was heavily involved in the conduct of the British Airways cabin crew strike of 1997, and in the successful general secretary election campaigns of Bill Morris (1991 and 1995) and Tony Woodley (2003) and, after the formation of Unite as a merger of the T&G and Amicus, of Len McCluskey in 2010. Murray was appointed as chief of staff for Unite in 2011 following Len McCluskey's election as general secretary late the previous year. Responsible for most of the union's central departments and for its ten regions, he was elected to the TUC General Council in April 2011. Ahead of the public sector pension strike, he was named by Education Secretary Michael Gove in November 2011 as being, along with McCluskey and Mark Serwotka, one of three union "militants" who were "itching for a fight".

He has also worked as an official for the Associated Society of Locomotive Engineers and Firemen (ASLEF).

Murray defended Arthur Scargill in a review of Marching to the Fault Line by Francis Beckett and David Hencke, which criticises the NUM leader's role in the miners' strike, advising Morning Star readers not to buy the book as doing so would only "feed the jackals".

=== Political activity ===
Murray joined the Communist Party of Great Britain in 1976, aged 18, and became associated with its Straight Left faction. At this time, Murray became a close friend of Seumas Milne, who was also active in Straight Left. Murray's allies during the period have been described by Francis Beckett as "more extreme than most of the Stalinists I knew. The Stalinists were known as tankies, but Murray's lot were super-tankies". Following the dissolution of the CPGB in 1991 he was a leader of the Communist Liaison group, which itself dissolved in 1995 with Murray and its other members joining the Communist Party of Britain. Murray served on the Communist Party of Britain's executive committee from 2000 to 2004, and was an advocate of the party supporting the Respect Coalition in the European and municipal elections that year. He served once more on the party's executive from 2008 until 2011. He told John Harris in 2015: "Communism still represents, in my view, a society worth working towards – albeit not by the methods of the 20th century, which failed".

As chair of Stop the War, Murray presided at the concluding rally against the Iraq War in 2003, a rally which is claimed as the largest political demonstration in British history. He announced his intention to stand down as Stop the War chair in June 2011 and was succeeded by the Labour MP Jeremy Corbyn in September 2011. Murray was elected by the Coalition's Steering Committee to the new post of Deputy President, but returned to the position of chair in September 2015, following Corbyn's election as Leader of the Labour Party.

In 2014, he co-founded Solidarity with the Antifascist Resistance in Ukraine, which organised protests outside London's Ukrainian embassy against the new government in Ukraine.

=== Labour Party roles ===
By November 2016, Murray had joined the Labour Party and, in May 2017 he was seconded from Unite to Labour headquarters during the 2017 general election. The appointment was contentious because of Murray's previous leadership role within the Communist Party of Britain, and was described by one Labour Party source to The Huffington Post as "Corbyn's Labour has gone full Trump. Andrew Murray is the hard-left's Steve Bannon". Asked by journalists about the appointment, Corbyn said Murray "is a person of enormous abilities and professionalism" who possesses "special skills". Shadow Chancellor John McDonnell defended the decision saying "He has left the Communist Party, and joined Labour. We are converting people to democratic socialism." The Daily Mirror's Associate Editor Kevin Maguire described him as "smart, shrewd, pragmatic and witty".

Murray was quoted in The Guardian on the day after the election about the unexpected exit poll announced just after the polling stations had closed. "There was a tremendous moment of elation when the exit poll was announced because it became apparent that the campaign had achieved the most stunning turnaround in public opinion in seven weeks" which saw Labour rise "from mid 20s in the polls at the start of the campaign to denying the Tories a majority. It was a moment of shared achievement". In a December 2017 interview with the Morning Star, Murray called for the readmission of George Galloway to the Labour Party.

In late February 2018, The Guardian reported that Murray was working 1½ days a week as a consultant to the Labour Party.

In 2018 The Times reported that the Ukrainian government said it had banned Murray from entering Ukraine for the following three years, and was accused by the regime of organising pro-Russian activities, including support for Donetsk People's Republic and Luhansk People's Republic. Murray blamed the ban on collusion between the UK "deep state" and the Ukrainian security service to discredit him and undermine the Labour Party, but that he had never tried to go to Ukraine nor obtain a visa to do so and that nor was he "planning a political visit to a country where the parliamentary speaker is a Hitler admirer and pogromists and Nazi collaborators are national heroes". He also said that he had no role in any real or imaginary pro-Russian activity, and characterised the Russian regime as "authoritarian conservative nationalism". Murray observed that the impetus for the ostensible ban was a speech he gave protesting the takeover of the Ukrainian government by ultra-nationalists.

Angela Smith and Mike Gapes, former Labour MPs who left to found the centrist Independent Group of MPs, said that Murray's involvement in the Labour Party were factors in their leaving.

In late February 2020, the Financial Times reported that Murray had resigned from his role as an adviser to the Labour Party and returned to his role within Unite on a full-time basis.

== Writings ==
Murray is the author of several books and numerous pamphlets, including The Communist Party of Great Britain: A Historical Analysis to 1941 (1995), Flashpoint World War III (1997), Off the Rails (2001), A New Labour Nightmare: Return of the Awkward Squad (2003), Stop the War: The Story of Britain's Biggest Mass Movement (with Lindsey German, 2005), and The T&G Story (2008). In 2019 Verso Books published his The Fall and Rise of the British Left reviewing the fortunes of British Socialism from the 1970s up until the 2017 general election. His most recent book Is socialism possible in Britain?: reflections on the Corbyn years was published in 2022.

Murray is currently a contributor to the Morning Star and Tribune.

=== The Imperial Controversy ===
The Imperial Controversy (2009) was described Nathaniel Mehr in Tribune magazine as "an important and timely book". In 2019, Murray attracted controversy for having argued in the book that Nazi Party leader Adolf Hitler is the most hated historical figure because he killed white rather than non-white people. Murray wrote, "Hitler is uniquely excoriated because his victims were almost all white Europeans, while those of Britain (and other classic colonialisms – French, Belgian, Dutch, Italian and Wilhelmine German) were Asian, African and Arabs." He also wrote elsewhere in the book: "There is nothing in the imperial record as chilling as the systematic extermination of the great majority of Europe's Jews."

== Positions ==
=== Admiral Duncan pub bombing ===
Regarding the neo-Nazi Admiral Duncan pub bombing in 1999 by David Copeland, Murray wrote in the Morning Star: "Everything about this episode strikes me as odd. It happened during a war [i.e. the NATO bombing of Yugoslavia] that is not going particularly well", and alleged that some neo-Nazi groups "may very well have been established with MI5 or Special Branch connivance. And certainly the state – or groups within the security apparatus – is more than capable of manipulating deranged human-haters without the latter even noticing that they are being manipulated." Murray told The Times in 2019: "As I wrote at the time my speculations were no more than 'conjecture and supposition'. There is no basis for any suggestion that the bombing of the Admiral Duncan was the responsibility of anyone other than David Copeland."

=== Communism and other issues ===
The Independent on Sunday described Murray in 2003 as an "admirer" of Stalinism. Murray wrote in his 1999 Morning Star column about Stalin:

Next Tuesday is the 120th anniversary of the birth of Josef Stalin. His career is the subject of a vast and ever expanding literature. Read it all and, at the end, you are still left paying your money and taking your choice. A socialist system embracing a third of the world and the defeat of Nazi Germany on the one hand. On the other, all accompanied by harsh measures imposed by a one-party regime. Nevertheless, if you believe that the worst crimes visited on humanity this century, from colonialism to Hiroshima and from concentration camps to mass poverty and unemployment have been caused by imperialism, then [Stalin's birthday] might at least be a moment to ponder why the authors of those crimes and their hack propagandists abominate the name of Stalin beyond all others. It was, after all, Stalin's best-known critic, Nikita Khrushchev, who remarked in 1956 that 'against imperialists, we are all Stalinists'.

In 1999, Murray said of KGB spy Melita Norwood: "She herself says that she has no regrets and I do not see why she should. She took advantage of the position that she was in to give her side a bit of help in the international class struggle. The strength of the Soviet Union was a huge factor in favour of world peace, something which has become more obvious in its absence today. Those who contributed, however slightly, to that strength did all of us a service." When asked about these comments by The Times in 2019, he said "The Cold War is over. I would under no circumstances condone anyone acting as Melita Norwood did today."

In 2008, Murray identified "one of the successes" of the "nationalities policy of the Soviet Union" as being the promotion of "the cultural, linguistic and educational development of each ethnic group, no matter how small or how historically marginalised." This comment was criticised by author Edward Lucas in The Guardian who accused Murray of ignoring "the Chechens, Crimean Tatars and other victims of Stalin's murderous deportation policies." In a short history of the CPGB, published in 1995, Murray wrote: "That things happened in the USSR which were inexcusable and which ultimately prejudiced Socialism's whole prospect is today undeniable. Whether Communists in the capitalist world could or should have done more than they did is much more contentious". In 2016, Oliver Kamm commented in The Times: "In short, Mr Murray believes that British communists in the 1930s were justified in backing the Great Terror, the Moscow Trials and the Ukraine famine. Mr Murray predictably supports the most nightmarish totalitarian state in the modern world". Murray was a critic of David Miliband in his role as Foreign Secretary, arguing that his stance on the 2008 Georgian crisis revealed him as a "neoconservative", whose approach had "made it abundantly clear where he stands on the great divide in world politics today. He is for the US empire." The Labour MP Tom Watson said that he was surprised that Murray was in the Labour party given that he is an "avowed Stalinist".

In 2003, Murray warned the Communist Party's Executive Committee of what he claimed was a "clear desire of the USA to effect 'regime change'" in North Korea, stating that "Our Party has already made its basic position of solidarity with Peoples' Korea clear". In response to a letter published in The Daily Telegraph from Conservative MP and Defence Spokesman Julian Lewis, he replied that he had made no secret of his political beliefs.

Murray is a vocal critic of Israel. He stated in a 2012 speech that "Palestine stands today undefeated and unbowed despite the bloody aggression by one of the greatest military powers on earth" and that "we have a message for the Israeli embassy, the Israeli government ... every time you kill a Palestinian child, you are digging your own graves".

Writing about the 2015 Charlie Hebdo shooting, Murray said: "The barbarism we condemn in Paris is minute compared to the barbarism wrought by imperialism across the planet in the last 13 years and we must condemn that."

== Private life ==
Andrew Murray was married to Susan Michie from 1981 to 1997. He remarried in 2003. He has three children with Michie and a stepdaughter.
