= Women Unite =

Women Unite is a vocal and percussion group consisting of eight South African women.

Women Unite, a marimba group, was founded in the spring of 1997 by Thandi Swaartbooi. The group has an idealistic profile, and seeks to empower women in various ways, particularly as related to art and music, and to stand up against contemporary social ills like AIDS, domestic abuse, drugs and gangsterism.

Their style of music is described by the group as traditional South African. In 2003 and 2004, Norway funded an exchange project between Women Unite and Brazz Brothers from Norway with concerts and workshops in South Africa, Swaziland, Mozambique and Norway.
