= James Bloodworth (journalist) =

English journalist and writer

James Bloodworth is an English journalist and writer. He has authored three full length books, also writing articles for newspapers such as The Wall Street Journal and The Guardian.

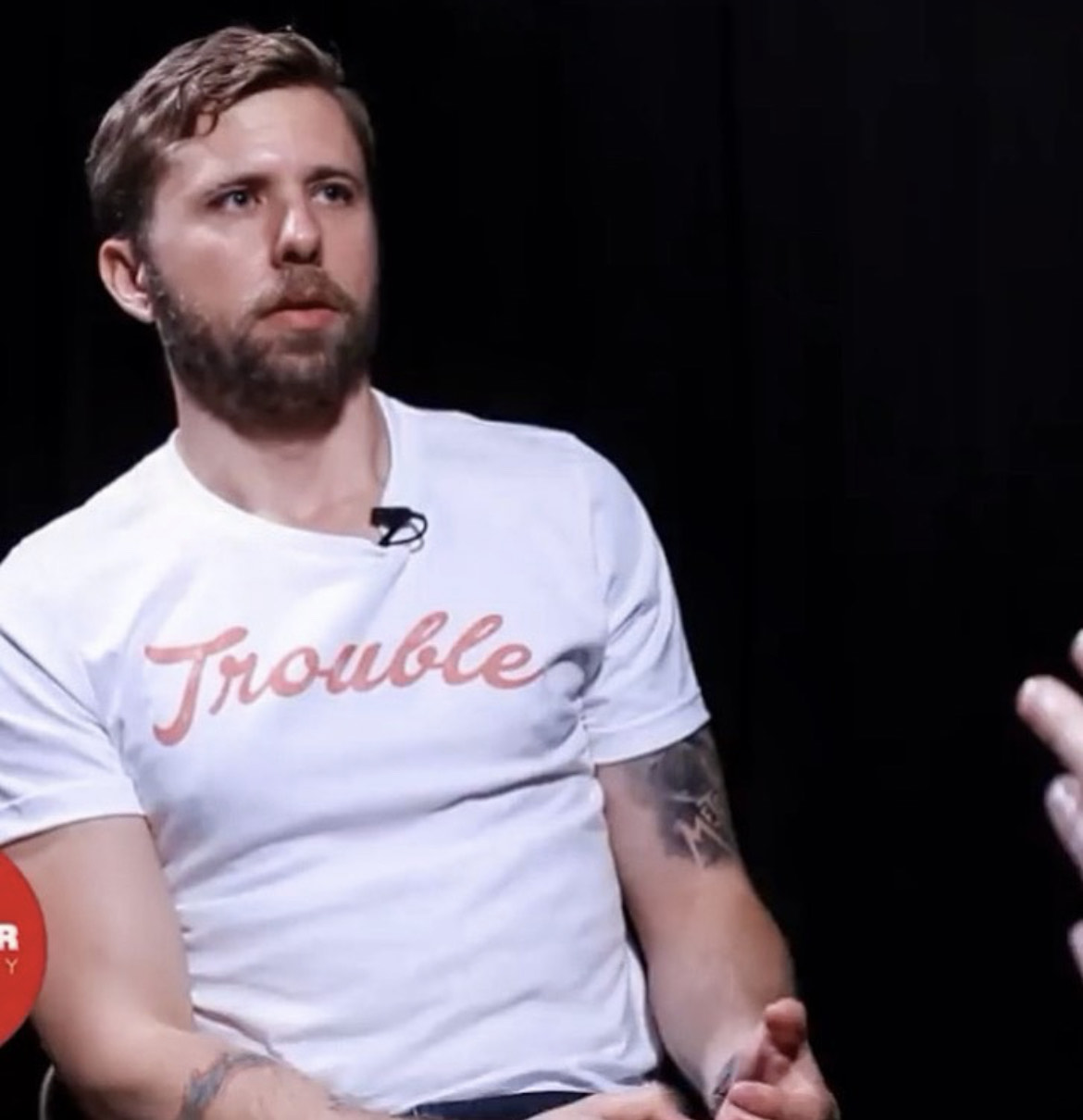
James Bloodworth in 2019

== Early years ==
Originally from Burnham-on-Sea in Somerset, Bloodworth studied politics at Nottingham Trent University and completed a master's degree in political journalism at City University in London, where he has lived since 2010.

== Writing career ==
A former member of the Trotskyist group Alliance for Workers' Liberty, he edited the left-wing blog Left Foot Forward from 2013 until 2016. Bloodworth previously wrote a weekly column for the International Business Times and wrote for The Spectator's Coffee House blog from 2013 to 2015. His work has also appeared in The Guardian', The Independent, The Wall Street Journal , and UnHerd. He currently writes a weekly column for the New Statesman and writes features for The Times Magazine.

== Books ==
Bloodworth is the author of The Myth of Meritocracy: Why Working-Class Kids Still Get Working-Class Jobs (Biteback Publishing) which was published in 2016.

Bloodworth's Hired: Six Months Undercover in Low-Wage Britain (Atlantic Books) was published in March 2018. To research the conditions faced by those working in low-paid and minimum-wage jobs, the author spent six months employed in such posts. This included periods working as a care worker in Blackpool, an Uber driver and in the UK packaging warehouse of Amazon. Bloodworth claimed in his book that Amazon workers were urinating in coke bottles because they were afraid to take bathroom breaks. The claim was repeated by US Congress member Alexandria Ocasio-Cortez in 2019 when she tweeted at Amazon: "Is that culture of 'strict performance' why Amazon workers have to urinate in bottles & work while on food stamps to meet 'targets?'"

According to one review, the book has been praised "across the political spectrum". In May 2019, Hired was longlisted for the Orwell Prize for political writing. Hired was also chosen by The Times as its current affairs book of the year 2018. In The Observer, Nick Cohen described Bloodworth as "the best young leftwing writer Britain has produced in years".

Bloodworth's third book, Lost Boys: A Personal Journey Through the Manosphere, was published by Atlantic Books in June 2025. The book was selected by Prospect as one of its recommended books for the summer.

== Politics ==
In September 2018, Bloodworth featured in a video for the channel of US Senator Bernie Sanders, in which Bloodworth drew on his book to criticise Amazon. Sanders tweeted out the video as part of the senator's push to introduce a bill that would charge large companies such as Amazon for the federal welfare programs that subsidize their low-wage workers.

Bloodworth has written extensively on low pay and Labour Party politics. He has also criticised left-wing admiration for authoritarian governments in Cuba and Venezuela. In a piece for The Independent in October 2012, Bloodworth wrote of Venezuela: "it's a funny sort of democracy (and certainly not one which can accurately be described as the best in the world) that attracts such harsh criticism from human rights groups like Amnesty International and Human Rights Watch – organisations which can hardly be dismissed as agents of neo-liberalism." In a later article for UnHerd, Bloodworth criticised left-wing supporters of the Venezuelan government, such as Owen Jones, for their silence about government repression and economic collapse. Bloodworth wrote: "Just a handful of years ago the Venezuelan government was praised uncritically by much of the Western left. Today it is an embarrassment – every emaciated Venezuelan a testament to the credulity of those who once lauded Hugo Chavez as the leader of a 'progressive, populist government that says no to neo-liberalism' (Owen Jones)."

He also wrote a piece for The Daily Beast in which he repeated the Fox News claim that Cuba sent troops to Syria to help prop up the government of Bashar al-Assad, which was denied by both the Cuban government and White House Press Secretary Josh Earnest.

Bloodworth described conservative thinker Roger Scruton's book Fools, Frauds and Firebrands as "an impressively lucid take down of some of the most fashionable left-wing thinkers of the past 50 years".

== Personal life ==
Bloodworth was diagnosed with ADHD at the age of 37.
