= Robert West (psychologist) =

Robert West is a British psychologist specialising in the psychology of addiction. He was professor of health psychology at University College London (UCL) and director of tobacco studies at the Cancer Research UK Health Behaviour Research Centre. He is now professor emeritus of health psychology at UCL.

West was also editor-in-chief of the journal Addiction.
