= Lindsey German =

British activist (born 1951)

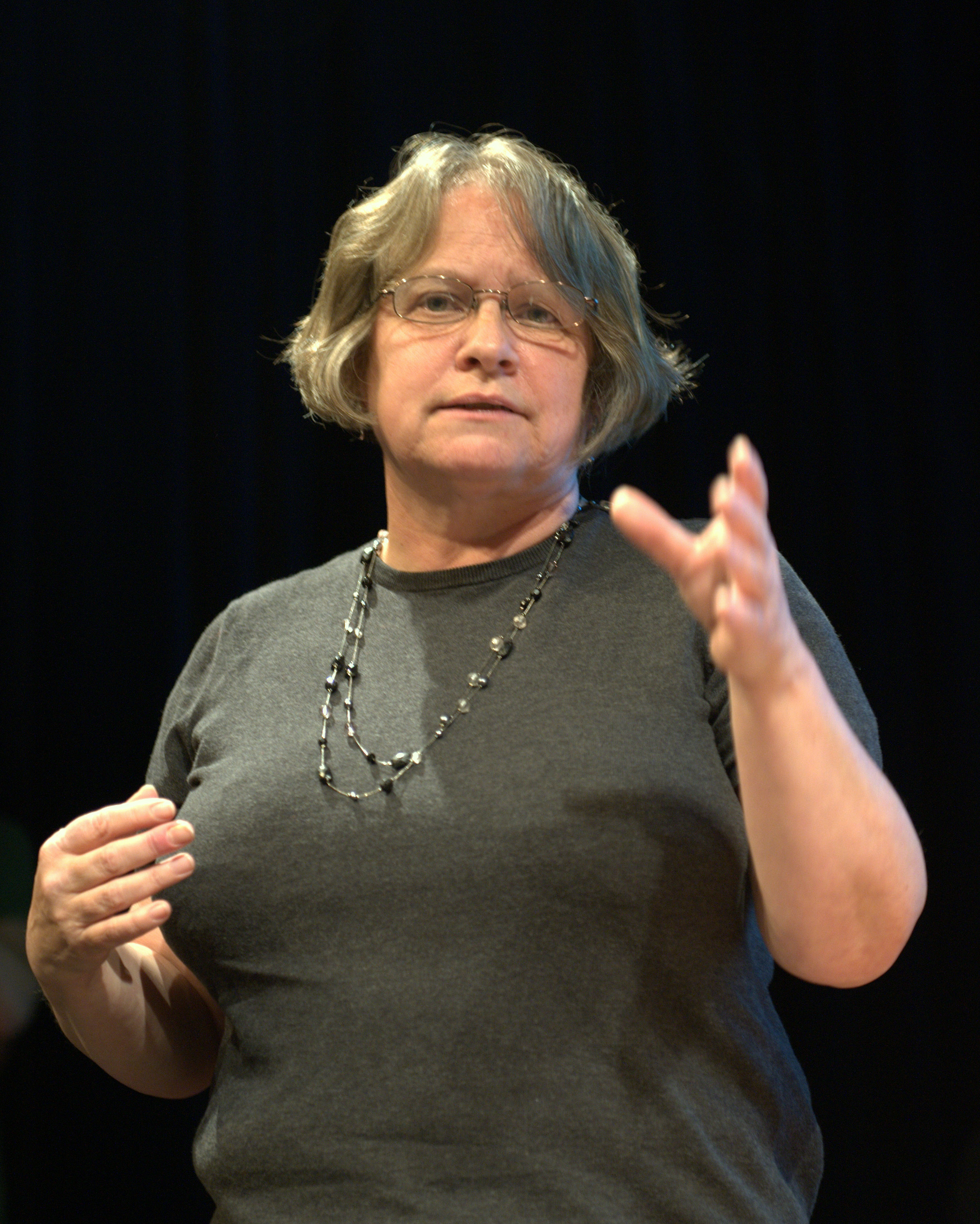
- German in 2009

Convenor of the Stop the War Coalition
- Incumbent
- Assumed office 21 September 2001
- Chairman: Jeremy Corbyn; Andrew Murray; Murad Qureshi
- Preceded by: Office established

Vice President of the Stop the War Coalition
- In office 21 September 2001 – 14 March 2014
- President: Tony Benn
- Chairman: Andrew Murray; Jeremy Corbyn
- Preceded by: Office established
- Succeeded by: Vacant

Personal details
- Born: Lindsey Ann German; 1951 (age 74–75) London, England, United Kingdom
- Party: Socialist Workers Party (before 2010)
- Education: London School of Economics

Lindsey Ann German (born 1951) is a British left-wing political activist. A founding member and convenor of the British anti-war organisation Stop the War Coalition, she was formerly a member of the Socialist Workers Party (SWP), sitting on its central committee and being editor of its magazine, Socialist Review.

German has twice stood as a left-wing candidate for Mayor of London, coming fifth in 2004, and as the Left List mayoral candidate in the May 2008 elections. In February 2010, following "increasing disenchantment" with the leadership, she resigned from the SWP, after 37 years' membership.

== Early life and activities ==
Lindsey German was born in London in 1951 and educated in Hillingdon at Vyners, then a state grammar school. In 1970, she attended the "Stop the '70 Tour" demonstration organised by Peter Hain against the tour of the all-white South African cricket team.

German joined the International Socialists (later the Socialist Workers Party) in 1972, the same year she began to read law at the London School of Economics. She was active in the original National Abortion Campaign in April 1975, then responding to a parliamentary private member's bill put forward by Glasgow Labour MP James White, and was involved in campaigns to achieve equal pay for women. German had become a full-time official by 1977 for what was now the Socialist Workers Party and a member of the party's central committee.

== Stop the War and Respect ==
German was involved in setting up the Stop the War Coalition in September 2001. It was established to oppose the war in Afghanistan and later Iraq. German became convenor of the Stop the War Coalition, speaking at meetings and demonstrations.

In January 2004, German supported the move to form Respect – The Unity Coalition, which included the SWP and other opponents of the war in Iraq, including Muslim groups and which stood as a left alternative to the Labour Party in elections. At the SWP's Marxism 2003 event she commented: "I'm in favour of defending gay rights, ... but I am not prepared to have it as a shibboleth, [created by] people who ... regard the state of Israel as somehow a viable presence."

She was Respect's candidate for the London Mayoral election in June 2004, in addition to being first in the list for election to the London Assembly. She came 5th in the mayoral election with 63,294 first and second preference votes (3.3% of the total) and in the assembly election came just below the 5% threshold in the top-up section (the assembly election followed the Additional Member System) which would have gained her a seat on the assembly. In the 2005 general election, she was the Respect candidate for the West Ham, London, constituency and came second with 19.5% of the vote.

== Departure from SWP ==
On 18 April 2007, she was selected as Respect's candidate for the 2008 London Mayoral election. However, a subsequent split within the organisation meant that German was not able to use the party's name in the election. Instead German stood as the candidate for Mayor and the assembly under the Left List name, the SWP part of Respect, finishing in eighth place in the election to be mayor with 16,796 votes on first preference.

According to journalist John Anderson, German was a leading figure promoting further ties between the SWP and various organizations such as the Muslim Association of Britain and the British Muslim Initiative.

German's employment by the SWP lasted until the January 2009 SWP party conference. At that conference the proposed slate did not include John Rees, German's partner and another long-standing member of the Central Committee (CC). German proposed an alternative slate which did include Rees. When it became clear this would be overwhelmingly defeated, German and Chris Nineham withdrew their names from the election and were not selected. As the Central Committee slate was the only proposed slate that went to the vote at conference she was not re-elected to the SWP's Central Committee in 2009. On 16 February 2010, German resigned from the SWP, along with 41 others.

German was the editor of the party's monthly magazine, Socialist Review, from 1984 until April 2004.

== Post-SWP ==
She has written several books, including two on women's rights and A People's History of London, co-written with her partner, John Rees.

In August 2015, German endorsed Jeremy Corbyn's campaign in the Labour Party leadership election.

In 2019, German wrote that there was little evidence for an epidemic of antisemitism within the Labour Party, with a "very small number of cases proved, and a small number of accusations made". She wrote that such allegations were "political attacks – against Corbyn and his left-wing politics, and against all those who criticise the state of Israel for its treatment of the Palestinians. These are the real reasons for their scale and ferocity, and why they are taken up with such enthusiasm by the BBC and the rest of the media."

In 2022, in response to the prelude to the Russian invasion of Ukraine, German wrote an opinion piece in The Guardian criticising Labour Party Leader Keir Starmer's support of the NATO alliance.

== Selected books ==
- — (1989). Sex, class, and socialism. London Chicago: Bookmarks. ISBN 0-906224-54-3. OCLC 29705337.
- — (1989). Why we need a revolutionary party. London: Socialist Workers' Party (Great Britain). OCLC 500315220.
- — (1996). A question of class. London: Bookmarks. ISBN 978-1-898876-05-2. OCLC 38468636.
- —, ed. (1999). The Balkans, nationalism and imperialism. London: Bookmarks. ISBN 1-898876-50-9. OCLC 41925091.
- with Murray, Andrew (2005). Stop the war: The story of Britain's biggest mass movement. London: Bookmarks Publications. ISBN 1-905192-00-2. OCLC 61283954.
- — (2007). Material girls : women, men and work. London: Bookmarks Publications. ISBN 978-1-905192-17-5. OCLC 165411835.
- with Rees, John (2012). A people's history of London. London/New York: Verso. ISBN 978-1-84467-855-6. OCLC 767564423.
- — (2013). How a century of war changed the lives of women. London/New York: Pluto Press / Palgrave Macmillan. ISBN 978-0-7453-3250-5. OCLC 830625531.

== Selected articles ==
- "Frederick Engels", International Socialism, 2:65, 1994
- "Theories of Patriarchy", International Socialism, 2:12, 1981
- "Reflections on the Communist Manifesto", International Socialism, 2:79, 1998
