= Chris Nineham =

British political activist

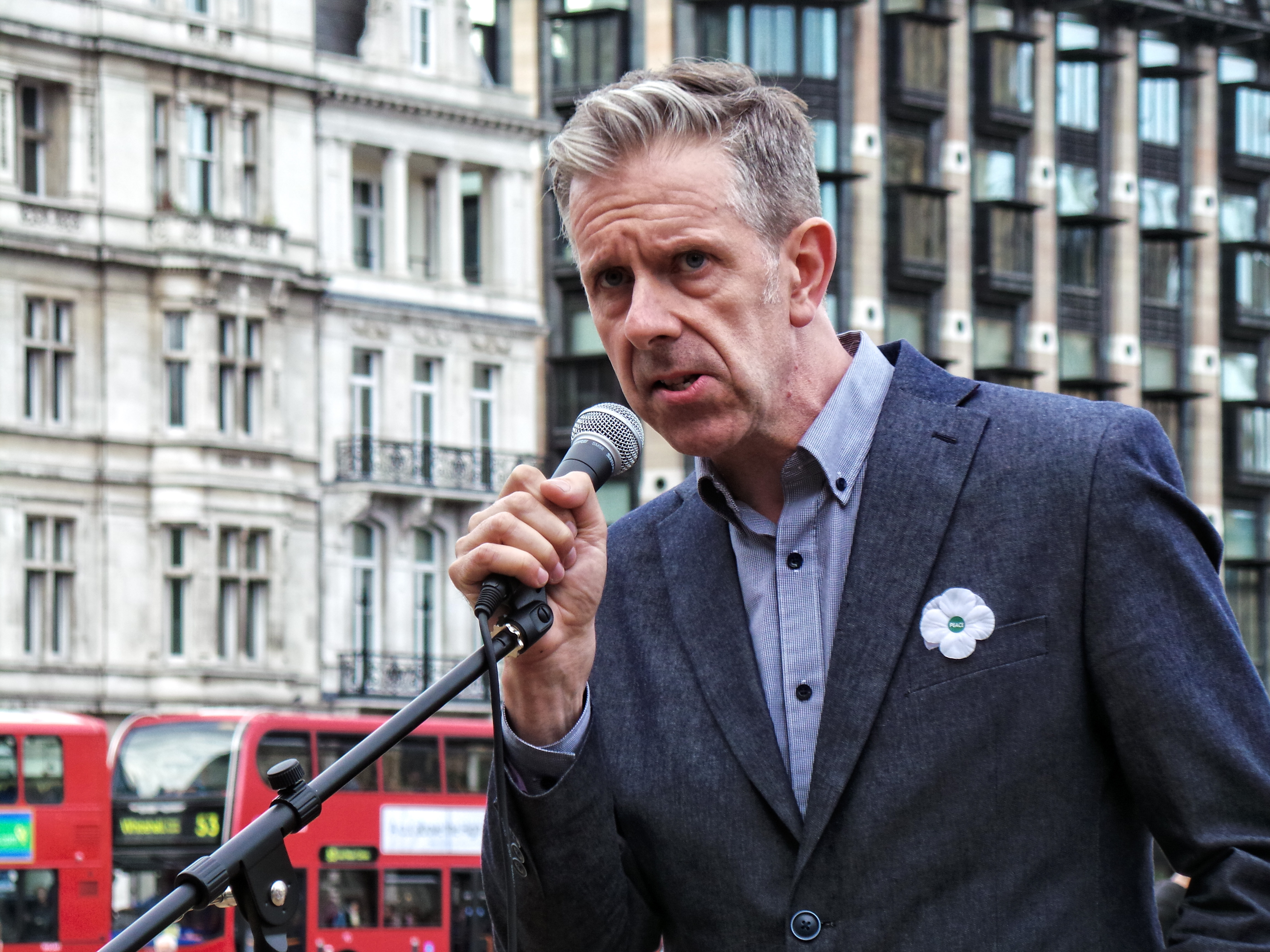
- Chris Nineham at the No More War event in Parliament Square, 2014.

Deputy Chair of the Stop the War Coalition
- Incumbent
- Assumed office 21 September 2001
- President: Tony Benn
- Vice President: Lindsey German
- Chairman: Andrew Murray; Jeremy Corbyn; Murad Qureshi
- Preceded by: Office established

Chris Nineham is a British political activist, writer and founder member of the Stop the War Coalition, serving as one of its National Officers and its Vice Chair. He served under Jeremy Corbyn from 2011 to 2015. He was one of the main organisers of the 15 February 2003 anti-war protest against the invasion of Iraq and the chief steward of the demonstration.

== Early life ==
Chris Nineham was born in London in October 1962. His father was Professor Dennis Nineham, who taught theology at London, Cambridge and Bristol universities and was Warden of Keble College Oxford for ten years. He went to Westminster School and studied at the London School of Economics and Middlesex Polytechnic. He obtained a doctorate from the University of Westminster in 2014.

He was drummer for the indie pop band The June Brides in 1983.

== Activism ==
He was a leading member of Globalise Resistance, the anti-globalisation network that protested in Genoa and elsewhere and he played a role in the European and World Social Forums. He was a member of the Trotskyist Socialist Workers' Party for many years until he resigned in 2010.

Nineham has written on the anti-war movement and the anti-capitalist movement as well as on the media, modernism and cultural theory, and is the author of The People Versus Tony Blair, Capitalism and Class Consciousness: The Ideas of Georg Lukács. and most recently Radical Chains: Why Class Matters.

Nineham has been Chief Steward for many of London's demonstrations against the Gaza war and the British government's involvement. He was arrested on 18 January 2025 and convicted on 1 April for breaches of the Public Order Act.

== Books ==
- Nineham, Chris (2010). Capitalism and Class Consciousness: The Ideas of Georg Lukács. Counterfire. ISBN 978-1907899010.
- Nineham, Chris (2013). People v. Tony Blair, The. John Hunt Publishing. ISBN 978-1780998169.
- Nineham, Chris (2017). How the Establishment Lost Control. John Hunt Publishing. ISBN 978-1785356315.
- Nineham, Chris (2019). The British State: A Warning. John Hunt Publishing. ISBN 978-1789043297.
- Nineham, Chris (2023). Radical Chains: Why Class Matters. John Hunt Publishing. ISBN 978-1789049350.

== Selected articles ==
- "Raymond Williams" (Socialist Review, 1996)
- "Anticapitalism: An idea whose time has come" (Socialist Review, 2001)
- "Don't be nostalgic about Tony Blair" (The Guardian, 2014)
