= Stop the War Coalition =

British anti-war group

- Abbreviation: StWC
- Founded: 21 September 2001; 25 years ago
- Type: Advocacy group
- Location: London, England
- Region served: United Kingdom
- Services: Anti-war, peace
- Method: Demonstration
- President: Brian Eno
- Key people: Andrew Murray, Lindsey German, Tony Benn, George Galloway, Jeremy Corbyn
- Website: stopwar.org.uk

The Stop the War Coalition (StWC), informally known simply as Stop the War, is a British group that campaigns against the United Kingdom's involvement in military conflicts.

It was established on 21 September 2001 to campaign against the impending war in Afghanistan. It then campaigned against the impending invasion of Iraq; the 15 February 2003 protest organised by the Coalition along with the Campaign for Nuclear Disarmament (CND) and the Muslim Association of Britain (MAB), was the largest public demonstration in British history.

Since then, the Coalition has campaigned against the 2011 military intervention in Libya and opposed UK involvement in the War against the Islamic State, stating that airstrikes would only fuel extremism. It opposed sending military aid to Ukraine during the Russian invasion, stating that it risks starting a war between NATO and Russia, a position which drew criticism from Andrew Fisher. It has called for ceasefires in the Russo-Ukrainian War and in the Gaza war.

The group has been criticised for allegedly excusing military aggression by enemies of the US and UK, and critics accuse it of being "more anti-West than anti-war".

== Formation and leading members ==
The impetus to form the Stop the War Coalition came following the September 11 attacks in the United States. The Coalition was launched at a public meeting of 2,000 people at Friends House on Euston Road in London, on 21 September which was chaired by Lindsey German, then active in the Socialist Workers Party (SWP). "The Stop the War Coalition has been formed to encourage and mobilise the largest possible movement against the war", said the founding statement. "Its aim is simple-to draw together everyone who wants to stop this madness, and to present the anti-war arguments which are squeezed out of the media." Among the sponsors of the Coalition were the former Labour Party MP Tony Benn, and the Labour MPs George Galloway, Tam Dalyell and Jeremy Corbyn, in addition to Tariq Ali, Harold Pinter, Suresh Grover and Andrew Murray.

German became Convenor of the Coalition and a meeting on 28 October settled the Coalition's official aims. This meeting also elected a steering committee which consisted of representatives of Labour Left Briefing and the Communist Party of Britain. Representatives of the Communist Party of Great Britain (Provisional Central Committee) and the Alliance for Workers' Liberty failed to get elected, although both became members of the Coalition and participated in its activities. At this time, it was alleged that the SWP dominated the organisation, although German, John Rees and Chris Nineham would leave the SWP in 2009. The Conservative MP Julian Lewis, in a letter to The Daily Telegraph in 2003, referring to Andrew Murray's involvement in the Communist Party of Britain, wrote that he "had thought" his "days of unearthing totalitarians at the heart of 'peace movements'" had ended when the Soviet Union collapsed, but Murray was now in a "key position, being quoted by the anti-war media as if he were a representative of democratic politics".

In this early period, Stop the War had a broad base. Ann Treneman wrote in The Times in January 2003 that the "two most obvious strands" of StWC support consisted of "the Establishment and the grassroots. This makes for some very strange bedfellows, who include retired generals, old peaceniks, former ambassadors, anti-globalisation protesters, Labour activists, trade unions, [and] the Muslim community". By the time of the February 2003 march in London, Greenpeace, the Liberal Democrats, Plaid Cymru and the Scottish National Party (SNP) were among the 450 organisations which had affiliated to the coalition, and the coalition's website listed 321 peace groups.

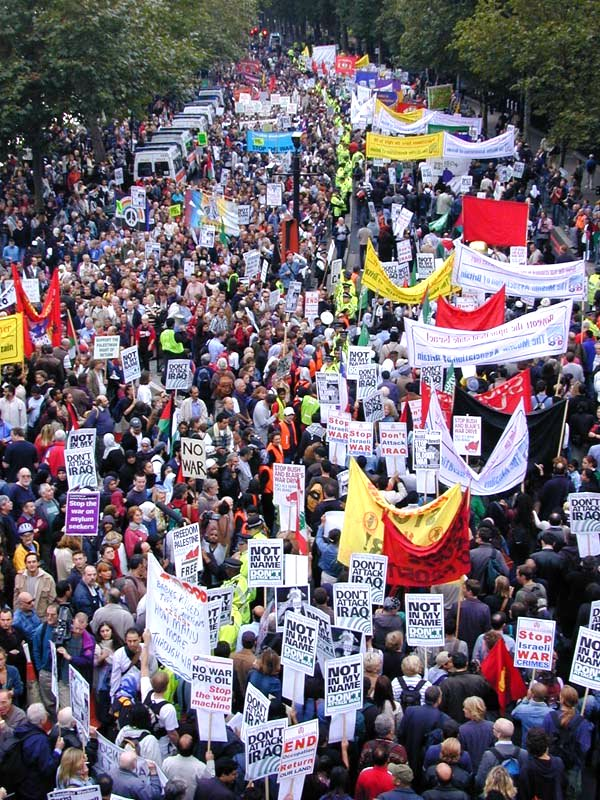
Banners on the march

At their initial meeting the Coalition also adopted the slogan "Against the racist backlash", stating that a war against Afghanistan would be perceived as an attack on Islam and that Muslims, or those perceived as being Muslim, would face racist attacks in the United Kingdom if the government joined the war. The Coalition worked closely with the Muslim Association of Britain in organising its demonstrations.

Andrew Murray was its first chair from 2001, and its vice-presidents have included Kamal Majid (who, according to Independent columnist Andy McSmith, helped found the Stalin Society) and George Galloway. Salma Yaqoob is a patron. Chris Nineham is a vice-chair.

== Iraq War and War on Terror (2003–2010) ==
=== Buildup to the Iraq invasion ===
The largest demonstration organised by the Coalition was the mass protest on 15 February 2003 in London against the imminent invasion of Iraq. It is said to have been the largest ever such event in the UK with estimates of attendance ranging between 750,000 and 2,000,000 people. The march was begun by police earlier than planned because of the number of people who had arrived at the two starting points. Speakers at the rally in Hyde Park included Tony Benn, Jesse Jackson, Charles Kennedy, Ken Livingstone, Mo Mowlam and Harold Pinter. StWC had forecast at the end of January that about 500,000 protesters would be on the march.

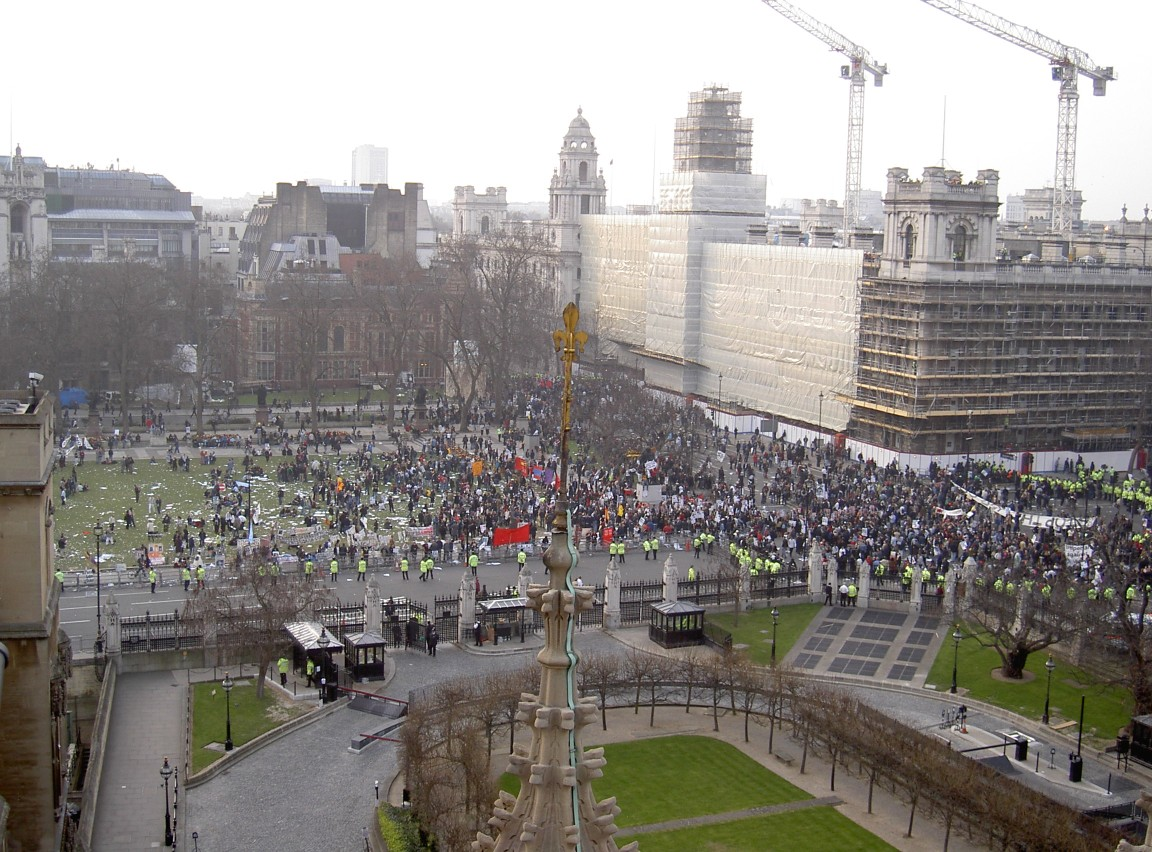
The Stop the War Coalition's 'Day X' demonstration as seen from the roof of the House of Commons.

As the military build-up continued, StWC urged its local groups and supporters to organise actions on the day the invasion of Iraq began. As this date was then unknown, it was dubbed "Day X", which eventually fell on 20 March 2003. Despite having very little time to put plans into action, events took place up and down the country: in London there was a large protest in Parliament Square; in Nottingham traffic outside an army recruitment centre was blocked for a while; and large numbers of school students walked out of lessons.

Following the beginning of the war and the events of Day X, the Coalition organised another national demonstration on the next Saturday, 22 March. The turnout for this march did not match the demonstration of 15 February. Stop the War said up to 500,000 attended and fellow organisers CND said between 200,000 and 300,000 attended. It was the largest anti-war demonstration held during wartime and had been organised with only a week's notice.

According to journalist James Bloodworth, in early 2003 Stop the War released a statement signed by officers of the Coalition appearing to support the Iraqi insurgency, recognising "the legitimacy of the struggle of Iraqis, by whatever means they find necessary, to secure such ends", which led to the resignation of former ASLEF union leader Mick Rix from the StWC executive, saying: "If you think I am going to sit back and agree with beheadings, kidnappings, torture and brutality, and outright terrorization of ordinary Iraqis and others, then you can forget it." An Early Day Motion was proposed by Labour MPs including Harry Barnes condemning their position and asking the group to "reassure the public that they have not lost their moral bearings."

=== Anti-war activities (November 2003–2005) ===
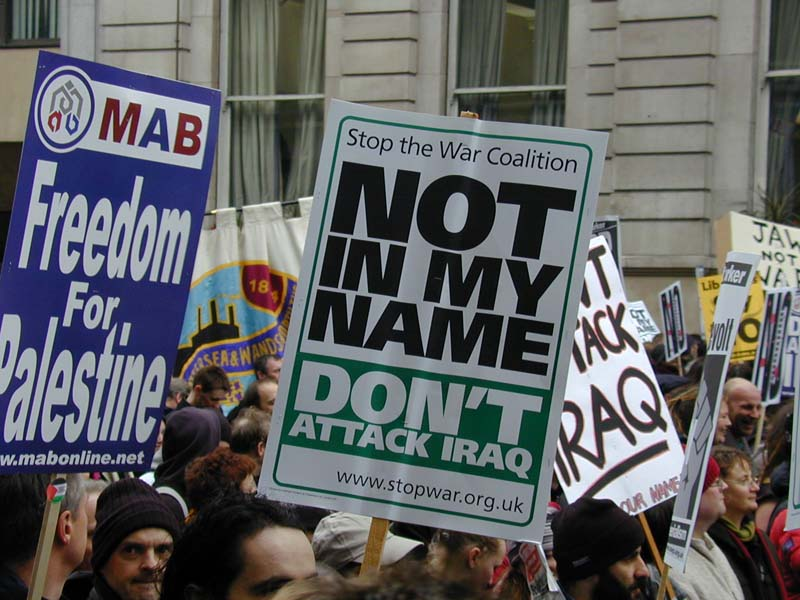
StWC Placard

The Coalition held a series of protests during November 2003 climaxing in a march on the 20th protesting against what it said was the aggressive foreign policy of U.S. President George W. Bush, and against the continued U.S. detention of prisoners in Guantanamo Bay, which protesters have said is an illegal infringement of human rights and the Geneva Conventions. A march past parliament was organised climaxing in a rally in Trafalgar Square. A papier-mâché statue of Bush was toppled in an action reminiscent of the much televised pulling down of a statue of Saddam Hussein in Baghdad by American soldiers. Speakers included politician George Galloway, then SNP leader Alex Salmond and Vietnam War veteran Ron Kovic. The coalition estimated that 300,000 people were present at the demonstration, while the police put those attending at 100,000 people.

On 19 March 2005, StWC organised a large demonstration in Westminster with supporters marching from Hyde Park to Parliament Square via the US embassy. The supporters were calling for the invading troops to move out of Iraq, for the US to not attack Iran and Syria, for the British government to halt reductions in the civil liberties of British citizens including the right to protest and a free trial (which they allege would result from the recent Prevention of Terrorism Act 2005 and Serious Organised Crime and Police Act 2005), and for a reduction in racism in the UK.

The date was chosen as the it was the international day of anti-war demonstrations, as called by the Assembly of the Social Movements at the 2004 European Social Forum. Estimates of the number of marchers vary from 45,000 by the police to over 100,000 by StWC to 200,000 by some observers. The protest was the first occasion on which a march had passed the US embassy in London since the protests over the Vietnam War.

John Rees has written: "Socialists should unconditionally stand with the oppressed against the oppressor, even if the people who run the oppressed country are undemocratic and persecute minorities, like Saddam Hussein."

Commentators such as Observer columnist Nick Cohen and Independent columinst John Rentoul accused Stop the War of being pro-Hussein. StWC was criticised by journalists such as Cohen for its refusal to condemn attacks on US and other foreign troops occupying Iraq, and refusal to condemn foreign insurgent fighters who have entered parts of the country. Cohen criticised the relationship of the StWC with organisations he considers reactionary such as the Muslim Association of Britain. He accused the coalition of ignoring the requests of secular trade unions and Kurds in Iraq. Cohen stated that there is a contradiction between the StWC's call for respect for human rights and its links with organisations that Cohen said call for the death penalty for homosexuality and apostasy.

=== The 7/7 London bombings ===
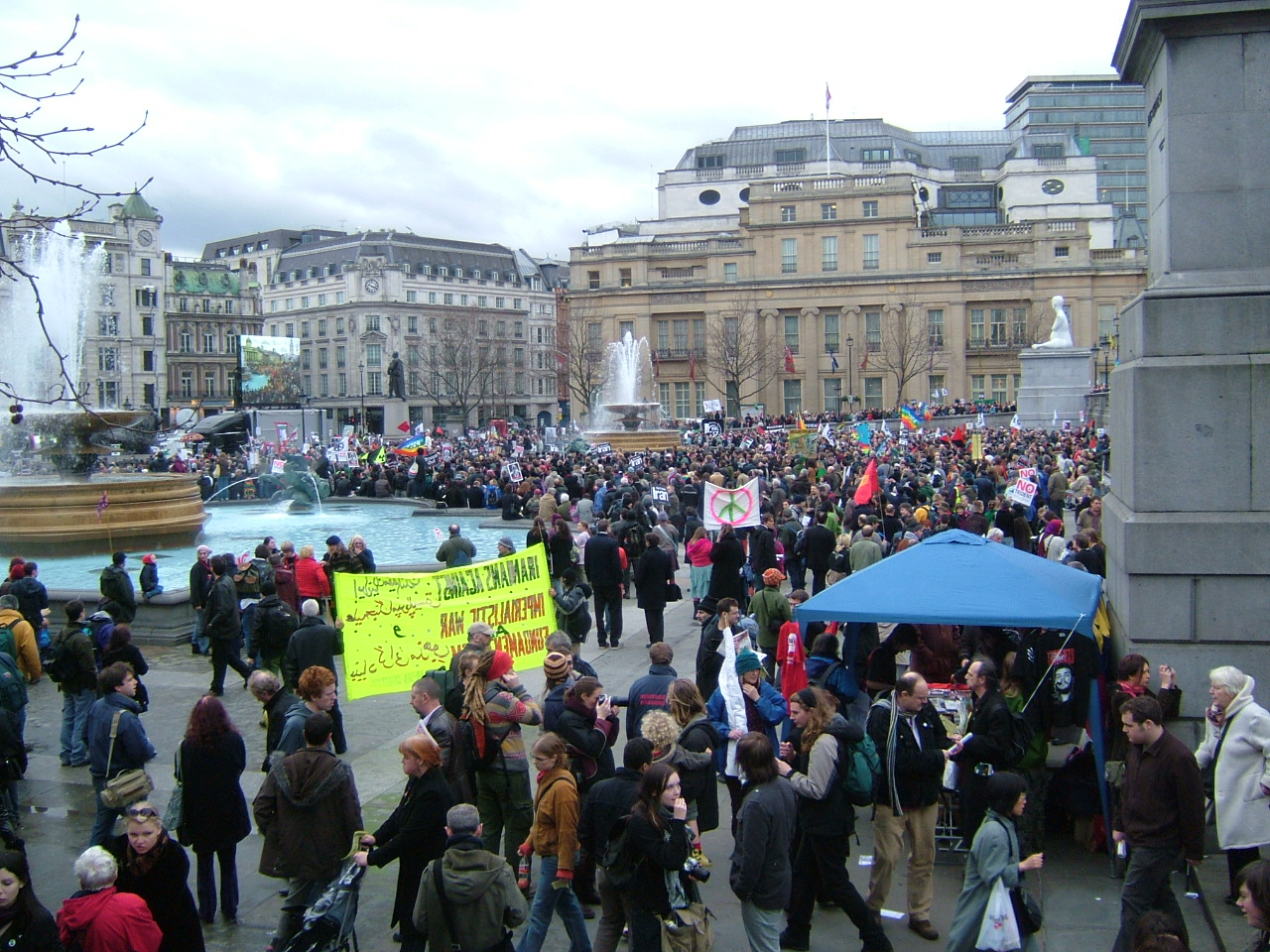
After the 2007 march, speeches in Trafalgar Square

Following the 7 July 2005 London bombings, StWC in association with CND and the Muslim Association of Britain held a vigil for the victims at the Peace Garden in Euston, London on 9 July 2005 and a further solidarity gathering at Russell Square, close to one of the Underground stations targeted, on 17 July 2005. At the latter StWC national convener Lindsey German condemned the bombings but added that "The only way to end the bombings is to withdraw from Afghanistan, Iraq and Palestine. When we have justice around the world we will have peace as well". The StWC also supported vigils across the country.

=== Demonstrations (2005–2009) ===
The StWC organised the British demonstration on 24 September 2005 using the slogans "Stop the Bombings", "Bring the Troops Home", "Defend Civil Liberties" and "Defend the Muslim Community". The protest coincided with protests in Washington, D.C., and occurred just before the Labour Party Conference began in Brighton.

On 10 December 2005 the StWC held an International Peace Conference attended by around 1,500 people. Speakers from across the world included Cindy Sheehan, the American mother whose son died in Iraq; and Hassan Juma, president of the Iraqi Southern Oil Workers Union.

At this conference a call was launched for an international demonstration on 18 March 2006. At the rally in London, Police estimating 15,000 marchers took part, but the groups organising the protest. which included CND and the Muslim Association of Britain as well as Stop the War, thought between 80,000 and 100,000 people had participated. According to Kate Hudson: "The government must listen to the voices of the people, which is calling on them to bring the troops home from Iraq".

On 23 September 2006, a demonstration was held outside the venue for the Labour Party Conference in Manchester. Estimates of attendance varied from "around 20,000" by the police, "up to 50,000" from the Coalition, to "more than 50,000" by the Socialist Worker.

The 2007 demo took place on 24 February 2007 in London, jointly organised with the CND. The themes of this march were No Trident and Troops Out of Iraq.

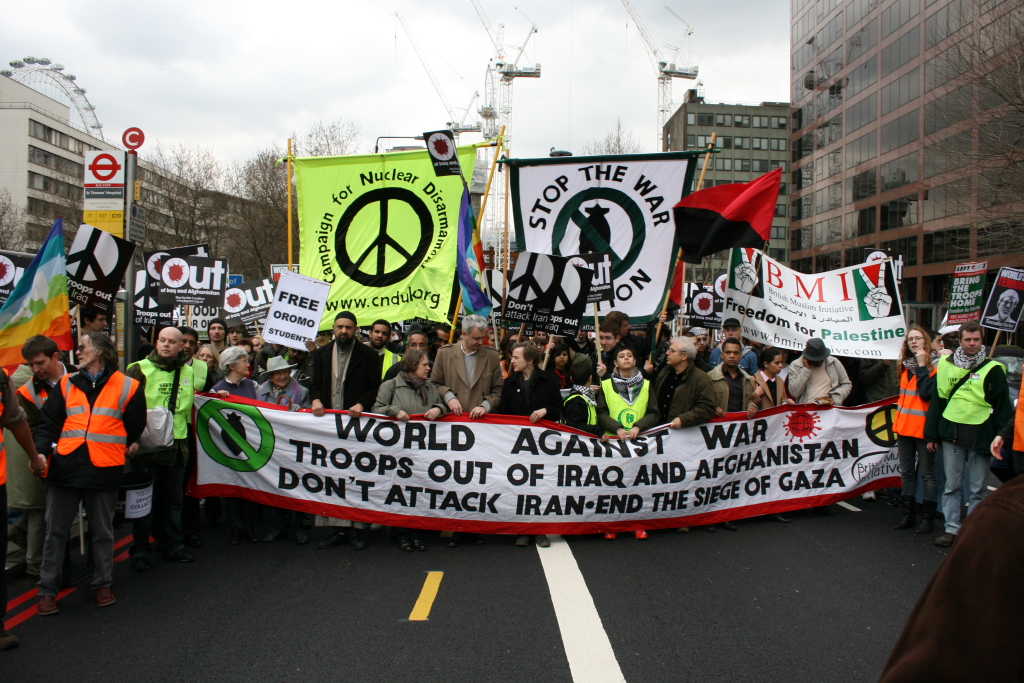
Stop the War protest in March 2008

On 15 March 2008 another international demonstration was held to mark the 5-year anniversary of the invasion of Iraq; although numbers did not match the original demonstrations, around 40,000 people were on the march in London. In Parliament Square, banners were placed in sight of the House of Commons. About the rally in Trafalgar Square, Tony Benn noted in his diary that he "spoke for four minutes and ten seconds. Two minutes was the limit, but I got away with it: they liked the phrase 'Parliament belongs to the past; the streets belong to the future'. They really liked that."

At a StWC meeting in March 2009, the coalition's co-founder and national officer John Rees said he was a "supporter" of Hezbollah and Hamas, which are proscribed terrorist organisations in the UK. He described them as "resistance" groups and "a legitimate part of [our] movement", likening them to French and Italian partisans fighting the Nazis in World War II. The Spectator and The Times alleged that Jeremy Corbyn also described Hezbollah and Hamas as "friends" at an StWC event that year, although he later said this was taken out of context.

A march from the American embassy in Grosvenor Square to Trafalgar Square on 1 April 2009 brought together protesters from the Stop the War Coalition, Palestine Solidarity Campaign, The British Muslim Initiative, and the Campaign for Nuclear Disarmament. On 2 April 200 people protested outside the ExCeL Centre in London where the G20 summit was being held.

== Libya and Syria (2011–2015) ==
=== Libyan Civil War (2011) ===
Stop the War opposed UK involvement in the Libyan Civil War. The Communist Party of Great Britain (Marxist–Leninist) was initially a member of the Stop the War Coalition. However, it and other individuals were expelled from the project on 23 September 2011 after it explicitly supported Muammar Gaddafi's Libyan Arab Jamahiriya in the Libyan Civil War against the NATO-backed rebels in Benghazi. The leadership of the Stop the War Coalition had said that the Benghazi rebellion, as part of the Arab Spring, was a "popular rising" and Gaddafi the head of a "brutal dictatorship." The CPGB-ML said that the Stop the War Coalition was taking a pro-imperialist line, that the Benghazi rebels were CIA/MI6 backed and that this pro-imperialist line was influenced by the "various Trotskyite, revisionist and left-Labour luminaries in the leadership." John Rees stated on the overthrow of Gaddafi "nobody is going to shed a tear for the fall of this brutal dictator."

=== Syrian Civil War (2011–2014) ===
Stop the War has also campaigned against British involvement in the Syrian civil war, which began in March 2011. StWC vice-president Kamal Majid said in a speech at a conference organised by the New Communist Party in 2012 that the Assad family has "a long history of resisting imperialism", and should be supported "because their defeat will pave the way for a pro-Western and pro-US regime". Samir Dathi wrote for the Stop the War website in June 2013: "Whilst many of us want nothing more than to see the ruthless dictator Assad go, we cannot support the further militarisation of the conflict, which will only perpetuate the horrific violence and refugee crisis in the region. If there is to be hope for the Syrian people, the first step is for all foreign interference to cease."

StWC organised protests ahead of votes in the British Parliament in August 2013 and December 2015. On the morning of the House of Commons vote on 29 August 2013 against military intervention in Syria, the conservative commentator Peter Oborne wrote in an article for The Daily Telegraph newspaper that Stop the War "has consistently shown far more mature judgment on these great issues of war and peace than Downing Street, the White House or the CIA. More surprising still ... [it] has often proved better informed than these centres of Western power, coolly warning against the diet of propaganda masquerading as bona fide intelligence." The vote was "a vindication of the mass anti-war movement in this country over the last decade", wrote Andrew Murray in The Guardian. "The possibility is now open for Britain playing a different role in the world, breaking with the policies and preoccupations of imperialism", but "that change is nothing like secured yet." The then chair of Stop the War, Jeremy Corbyn, thanked supporters for lobbying their MPs. "There still exists the danger of renewed conflict as the interests of the military, arms dealers, and others remains ever present and very powerful", he wrote.

In September 2013, StWC published an article by Robert C. Koehler saying that the recent Ghouta chemical attack was a false pretext for war in Syria:

"As always, the war’s stated purpose — 'a punitive strike against the Syrian government' — is just a cover story. The U.S. and its possible allies, France and Great Britain, all have an interest in regaining influence in Syria, which requires Assad’s collapse. But beyond the geopolitics, there are deeper and darker hidden motives for launching a bright new war. We, or at least our government and the economic interests it serves, are addicted to war."

In November 2013, it was announced that Mother Superior Agnes Mariam de la Croix had withdrawn from a forthcoming Anti-war conference organised by Stop the War for 30 November, after journalists Owen Jones and Jeremy Scahill had refused to share a platform with her because of accusations that she is a supporter of the Assad government. According to Amr Salahi, writing for the Left Foot Forward website, no Syrian was among the speakers at the event, but the former Guardian foreign correspondent Jonathan Steele said that he would have happily shared the platform with Mother Agnes.

== Jeremy Corbyn and Labour (2015) ==
From 2011, Jeremy Corbyn was the chair of the Stop the War Coalition. When he stood as a candidate for the Labour Party leadership, the organisation's national convenor, Lindsey German, advocated that he should be supported. A week after his election as Labour leader in September 2015, it became known that he was stepping down as Chair of Stop the War, but would continue to support the group.

=== November 2015 Paris attacks ===
Following the November 2015 Paris attacks, STWC published an article on their website titled "Paris reaps whirlwind of western support for extremist violence in Middle East". According to commentator Mehdi Hasan, the article blamed the rise of ISIL and the Paris attacks on “deliberate policies and actions undertaken by the United States and its allies”. The piece was criticised by Labour MPs, including Hilary Benn, then shadow foreign secretary, who said it was "wholly wrong". He said that the attacks were not the fault of the French, rather it was the "fault of the attackers." By this time, the article had already been removed from the Stop the War website.

Murray told John Harris in an interview for The Guardian: "It didn't represent the organisation's views on Paris, and I think it was ... well, the best one could say is, extremely insensitive." Jon Lansman, of the Corbynite Momentum pressure group, commented later about the material concerning the Paris attacks: "I think even Stop the War themselves have accepted they were stupid for publishing those articles. There were some very silly things published, and wrong things."

These statements were among the reasons given by Green Party MP Caroline Lucas for her resignation from StWC on 8 December. Her spokesperson said:

Caroline was specifically troubled by some Stop the War Coalition statements after the Paris atrocities. Though the pieces were subsequently taken down she felt unable to associate herself with them.

=== Syrian Civil War (late 2015) ===
In early November 2015, Corbyn's shadow Foreign Office Minister, Catherine West, said Labour would consult StWC before deciding whether to back airstrikes in Syria, prompting Labour MP Tom Harris to threaten resignation.

Following the Paris attacks and the adoption of United Nations Security Council Resolution 2249, the UK parliament voted on air strikes against ISIL in Syria. Stop the War lobbied MPs against supporting the proposal, along with members of Momentum. Both groups were accused of intimidation. The constituency office of local Labour MP Stella Creasy was protested by Waltham Forest StW and other groups, and Creasy and other MPs reported receiving heavy lobbying, leading to the popularity of the hashtag "I Stand with Stella". George Galloway dismissed the significance of the threats and Lindsey German defended the rights of protesters on the StW website: she wrote that she was "against bullying and intimidation. I condemn people who send abusive texts or messages" having received them herself.

The Labour Party gave its MPs a free vote in the debate, a decision condemned as "deplorable" by StWC. The parliamentary debate took place on 2 December, and was won by the government with the support of some Labour MPs. Hilary Benn gave the closing speech advocating air strikes, evoking the history of anti-fascism. In response, an article appeared on the StWC website. The article, soon taken down, read in part: "Benn does not even seem to realise that the jihadist movement that ultimately spawned Daesh [Isis] is far closer to the spirit of internationalism and solidarity that drove the International Brigades than Cameron's bombing campaign." A few days later, Andrew Murray commented that he thought the piece was "wholly absurd. It doesn't reflect Stop the War's view in the slightest. It was taken down as soon as I saw it was up there. I'd apologise to any Stop the War supporters who were upset by it." The editor of the website resigned.

Caroline Lucas cited her concerns that Syrians had not been allowed to speak at an StWC parliamentary meeting by its chair, Diane Abbott, as one of the reasons for her resignation. These concerns were shared by the human rights activist Peter Tatchell. On Channel 4, Tatchell described the group's work opposing the war on Iraq as "extraordinary and brilliant", but said that they had "completely lost the plot on Syria."

On 10 December 2015 on the Coalition's website, John Rees wrote that Stop the War does not support the Assad regime. It "does believe that it is the people of Syria who are the only ones who should decide the fate of their country free of all great power and regional power interference".

=== Corbyn and the StWC Christmas 2015 dinner ===
Corbyn's continued involvement in the group became a source of friction with other leading members of the Labour Party. The former Labour shadow cabinet minister for Education, Tristram Hunt, described the group as a "really disreputable organisation" on 6 December when Corbyn's intention to attend the group's fundraising Christmas dinner on 11 December was becoming an issue. Former shadow ministers Emma Reynolds and Caroline Flint also urged him to distance himself from the group. Reynolds referred to the "abhorrent views" of Stop the War's leadership and described the group's positions as being "anti-West rather than anti-war", while Flint said they "are not Labour's friends".

Attendance at the Stop the War event on 11 December cost £50 a head and included entertainment by musician Dmitri van Zwanenberg and comedian Francesca Martinez. Corbyn attended to keep a promise to formally hand over his position as StWC's chair to Andrew Murray. In his speech at the event, at a Turkish restaurant in Southwark, south London, Corbyn said the "anti-war movement has been a vital force at the heart of our democracy" and "I think we've been right on what we've done". Kurds who supported British airstrikes on ISIL targets also protested outside the dinner.

Tariq Ali, in an article for The Independent, thought the recent attacks on Stop the War were motivated by the "nasty and unpleasant war being waged in England, targeting Jeremy Corbyn" and wondered if the distancing of leading Green activists from Stop the War was because Corbyn "is attracting the electoral support of large numbers of hitherto Green supporters".

Stop The War prevented pro-revolution Syrians from joining its 12 December demonstration against anti-ISIL airstrikes.

International Business Times reported that a senior Muslim insider at StWC said that British Muslims were abandoning the Coalition due to its Syria positions.

== After 2016 ==
=== Syrian Civil War (2016–2019) ===
In October 2016, during the Russian-backed Syrian government siege of Aleppo, protesters heckled Corbyn at a StWC conference, where he was due to give a speech, for his failure to call for regime change in Syria. Other speakers expected to speak at the event included Anas Altikriti, described by The Times as "a supporter of the terrorist group Hamas", but Altikriti did not turn up.

A few days later, Boris Johnson called for protests against Russian involvement in the Syrian civil war, saying "Where is the Stop the War Coalition at the moment? Where are they?" StWC vice chair Chris Nineham said "we can make a difference to what Britain does, we can make a difference to what our allies do to a certain extent and we have done. "But, if we have a protest outside the Russian embassy, it wouldn't make a blind bit of difference as to what Putin does because we are in Britain and we are in the West [and] a protest outside the Russian embassy would actually contribute to increasing the hysteria and the jingoism that is being whipped up at the moment against Russia... anyone who has a responsibility for peace or the future of the planet quite frankly needs to mobilise against that, and that means opposing the west."" Nineham's comments and the StWC official statement on Syria were widely criticised on social media.

Human rights advocate Peter Tatchell described StWC as in 'moral meltdown' in a December 2016 Independent newspaper article entitled "The Stop the War Coalition is more interested in fighting the West than fighting for Syrians". According to Tatchell:

The Stop the War Coalition (STWC) is in moral meltdown and in the throes of a rebellion by many of its longtime supporters – including me – over its one-sided Syria protests and its persistent failure to listen to appeals from democratic, anti-war and civil society activists inside Syria...The coalition won't even campaign for airdrops of food and medical supplies to besieged civilians... In a breathtaking display of double standards, they supported aid convoys to refugees in Calais but not to those in Aleppo. No wonder the movement is increasingly discredited.

Tatchell added:

Symptomatic of the rot at the heart of Stop the War Coalition is former chair Andrew Murray's article published in the Morning Star in October. A leading official in the anti-war movement, Murray blasted the West but didn't even mention Russia's mass killing of women and children in Syria.

In a January 2017 interview entitled "Here's what Jeremy Corbyn could do, to win in 2020", Tatchell spoke positively of Corbyn, who he has known for more than three decades, but called on Corbyn to distance himself from StWC:

It's very difficult to justify how any Left Wing person can support StWC while it maintains its current double standards. I think he needs to recognise STW is a deeply flawed organisation with deeply flawed politics.

In April 2017, Syrian refugee Hassan Akkad described being "shouted down" at a StWC demonstration at Downing Street when he asked why the group was not protesting Assad's government.

One of Corbyn's speeches at a Stop The War event, dating from 2011, featured in a Conservative Party attack ad in June 2017, with an extract used to portray him as soft on terrorism.

StWC opposed Western airstrikes in Syria in April 2018, launched in response to a chemical attack on Douma, a suburb of Damascus. It said that the “overwhelming majority of people in this country oppose this action just as they have opposed the series of wars of the last seventeen years”. This statement was fact-checked by The Week, which found the UK public was actually evenly split.

=== 2020–21 ===
In 2020, it demonstrated in opposition to war with Iran in the wake of the US assassination of Qasem Soleimani, an Iranian general. It said the assassination was "an act of war by Donald Trump. The act was carried out in Baghdad, violating all agreements with the Iraqi government. Both Iran and Iraq will retaliate."

In May 2021, it protested alongside the Palestine Solidarity Campaign against Israeli airstrikes on Gaza, and again in June 2021 to call for sanctions on Israel.

=== Ukraine (2022) ===
In February 2022, Stop the War released its statement on the Russian invasion of Ukraine, declaring "Stop the War opposes any war over Ukraine, and believes the crisis should be settled on a basis which recognises the right of the Ukrainian people to self-determination and addresses Russia's security concerns". It said the group's focus "is on the policies of the British government which have poured oil on the fire". The statement criticized NATO for alleged aggression against Russia, and it denied that Ukraine had a right to join the alliance (see NATO–Ukraine relations).

The statement was signed by 11 Labour MPs including former Shadow Chancellor of the Exchequer John McDonnell and former Shadow Home Secretary Diane Abbott. It was condemned by Labour Party leader Keir Starmer who wrote in an opinion article for The Guardian:

"[T]he likes of the Stop the War coalition are not benign voices for peace. At best they are naive, at worst they actively give succour to authoritarian leaders who directly threaten democracies. There is nothing progressive in showing solidarity with the aggressor when our allies need our solidarity and – crucially – our practical assistance now more than ever."

Starmer later threatened to withdraw the party's whip from the 11 MPs unless they withdrew their signatures, which they did. McDonnell and Abbott later pulled out of attending a Stop the War rally in London amid pressure from Labour leadership.

Stop the War opposed countries sending weaponry to help Ukraine fend off the invasion, accusing NATO and the EU of "warmongering".

Jeremy Corbyn supported StW in an opinion article for Jacobin:

Keir Starmer claims that the Stop the War Coalition is a Russian stooge. There is no evidence that they’ve done anything other than stand up for peace around the world.

Andrew Fisher, Labour's director of policy under Corbyn, dissented and argued that the campaign was out of step with the majority of the trade union movement which supported Ukraine's right to resist the invasion.

=== Gaza War (2023–) ===
During the Israel–Gaza war, StWC was one of the organisers of a series of demonstrations, jointly with the Palestine Solidarity Campaign, Friends of Al-Aqsa, the Muslim Association of Britain, the Palestinian Forum in Britain and the Campaign for Nuclear Disarmament, including on 11 November, when the demonstration was opposed by far right counter-protestors.

== Criticism ==
Critics accuse the group of being more "anti-West than anti-war". Some critics refer to it as "Stop the West".

In 2005, StWC put out a statement seeming to support the Iraqi insurgency. It called for an end to the Coalition occupation and recognized "the legitimacy of the struggle of Iraqis, by whatever means they find necessary, to secure such ends". In protest at the statement, railway drivers' union leader Mick Rix resigned from the StWC executive.

Journalist James Bloodworth wrote that "Stop the War courted controversy by appearing to back the Russian annexation of Crimea" in 2014. Labour MP Emma Reynolds said in 2015 that StWC "have excused Russia for invading Ukraine and Georgia".

During the Syrian civil war, Stop the War was linked to groups who support Syrian president Bashar al-Assad. According to the journalist Andrew Gilligan in The Daily Telegraph, many individuals associated with Stop the War openly support Ba'athist Syria. In 2015, Tatchell along with eighteen Syrian campaigners and academics co-signed a letter criticising StWC for its stance on Syria. Calling themselves "previous strong supporters of the Stop the War Coalition", they said "on the issue of Syria, StWC has lost its moral compass and authority". It alleged that StWC had ignored "war crimes committed by the Assad regime", "failed to organise or support protests against the Assad dictatorship and the regime's massacre of peaceful democracy protesters", "failed to support demonstrations against the escalating Russian, Iranian and Hezbollah military interventions in Syria", and "repeatedly refused to have anti-Assad Syrian democrats and leftwingers on its platforms".

Human rights campaigner and former StWC supporter Peter Tatchell said in 2015 that the group's opposition to US imperialism sometimes led it to ignore "the horrendous crimes of despotic anti-American regimes like Russia and Iran". In 2015, more than 500 members of the Labour Party signed an open letter saying: "We believe that Stop the War Coalition stands apart from the Labour movement's values of internationalism, anti-fascism and solidarity. The rush to blame western liberal democracies has resulted in StWC all but absolving dictators and terrorists of their butchery. This is not an anti-war movement. It is an embarrassing sect belonging to the extreme left". StWC said the Conservative government, the right of the Labour party and sections of the media had consistently misrepresented its positions and that it had never supported the Assad government or Russian intervention in Syria.

The group faced criticism following the November 2015 Paris attacks, in which 130 people were killed by Islamist terrorists, when it published an article saying France had "reaped the whirlwind" of "Western support for extremist violence in the Middle East". Soon after, it published another article saying that jihadists were driven by a "spirit of internationalism and solidarity" akin to the International Brigades of the Spanish Civil War. Green Party MP Caroline Lucas stepped down as a patron of StWC in protest. Both articles were removed and disowned by StWC.

In 2014 and 2015, Jewish News wrote that several controversial articles were posted and then deleted from the group's website, including "some advocating war against Israel". According to Jewish News, "One appeared to sympathise with jihadists", while another, by Richard Falk, was titled "Time to go to war with Israel as the only path to peace in the Middle East". Falk wrote that "pressures exerted through the mobilisation of a movement from below, combining popular resistance with global solidarity” was the best way of realising Palestinian statehood. The Jewish Chronicle wrote that the StWC website posted and then removed an article by Alison Weir, alleging that the Palestinians had not planned on killing athletes during the massacre of Israeli athletes at the 1972 Munich Olympics and Israel’s "ethnic cleansing of the Palestinians" should be taken into account when considering the athletes’ deaths.

== Notable current and former members ==
- Diane Abbott, Labour Party Member of Parliament (MP) and StWC Patron
- Tariq Ali, StWC Vice-President, writer and activist
- Tony Benn, StWC President (2001–2014), former Labour Party MP and Cabinet Minister
- Andrew Burgin, StWC press officer
- Louise Christian, StWC Vice-President, campaigning lawyer
- Katy Clark, former Labour Party MP
- Anna Chen, former press officer
- Jeremy Corbyn, former StWC officer and chair (2011–2015), Independent Member of Parliament (MP) and former Labour Party leader
- Tam Dalyell, StWC Vice-President, former Labour Party MP
- Brian Eno, musician and current StWC President
- George Galloway, StWC Vice-President, Workers Party of Britain leader
- Lindsey German, StWC convenor, former Socialist Workers Party (SWP) Central Committee member, Respect candidate in the elections for Mayor of London
- Kate Hudson, StWC officer, chair of the Campaign for Nuclear Disarmament (CND), former member of the Communist Party of Britain.
- Lowkey, rapper and activist
- Caroline Lucas, former StWC Vice-President, Green Party MP and ex-party leader (resigned from StWC December 2015)
- Alice Mahon, StWC Vice-President, former Labour Party MP
- Kamal Majid, a founding member of the Stalin Society
- Kika Markham, actress and StWC patron
- Andrew Murray, StWC chair (2001–2011, 2015–16), Chief of Staff of Unite the Union, former member of the Communist Party of Britain.
- Chris Nineham, StWC officer, former Socialist Workers Party Central Committee member
- Betty Papworth, communist, Communist Party of Great Britain member
- Murad Qureshi, former StWC Chair, former Labour and Co-operative Party London Assembly member and councillor
- Mark Rylance, Stop the War Patron and actor
- Keith Sonnet, StWC Vice-President, Deputy General Secretary of UNISON
- Walter Wolfgang, StWC member, Vice-chair Labour CND, Vice-president CND and member of the Labour Party's National Executive Committee
- Salma Yaqoob, former member of Birmingham City Council, former Respect Party member and co-founder.

== See also ==
- A.N.S.W.E.R.
- Campaign Against Arms Trade
- Conscience: Taxes for Peace not War
- List of anti-war organizations
- List of peace activists
- Parliament Square Peace Campaign
