= 2013 Socialist Workers Party internal crisis =

In 2013, the Socialist Workers Party (UK) (SWP) experienced an internal crisis, now called the 'Comrade Delta scandal'. It concerned the SWP's handling of allegations of rape by a 19-year-old woman, known as Comrade W, against Martin Smith, National Secretary of the SWP (referred to in internal documents as Comrade Delta), then in his 40s.

== Events leading to the crisis ==
Comrade W initially made the allegations that Smith had sexually assaulted her in July 2010. Smith was demoted from National Secretary but remained on the Central Committee. Comrade W left the SWP following this decision.

The party was told about the allegations at its 2011 conference, with speeches by Alex Callinicos and other prominent members. Smith also spoke and received a standing ovation.

Comrade W rejoined in 2012 and made a further allegation of rape in September 2012. The case was heard by the Disputes Committee over two days in October 2012. Reported problems included:

- Smith was given details of the complainant's case weeks in advance, but Comrade W did not see his evidence;
- Committee members included Smith's colleagues;
- Comrade W was asked about why she went for a drink with Smith;
- She was questioned about previous boyfriends and whether those were “full sexual relationships”.

Leaked accounts of the hearing were published on the Socialist Unity website, resulting in backlash. Four members were expelled for discussing the case on social media.

The Disputes Committee reported to the SWP's annual national conference (4–6 January 2013) that it had unanimously found Smith not guilty. The conference accepted this by 231 votes to 209, with 18 abstentions. Comrade W was not permitted to speak.

A transcript of the conference debate was leaked on 7 January, attracting national attention.

In March 2013, The Guardian reported a different woman stating she had been inappropriately questioned by the Disputes Committee after reporting rape by another SWP member. She said she was questioned about alcohol consumption and that the accused had her statement a month before the hearing while she had none of his.

In July 2013 it was reported that another woman, Comrade X, an SWP employee, had made allegations of sexual harassment against Smith in October 2012. Smith resigned from the SWP in July 2013 before her case was heard.

Later in 2013, he was accepted as a PhD student in social work at Liverpool Hope University.

== Responses from SWP members ==
The publication of the January 2013 conference transcript prompted resignations from a number of members. Tom Walker of the Socialist Worker detailed his reasons for leaving in the Weekly Worker.

An alleged former Central Committee member wrote under the pseudonym “Donny Mayo” on the Counterfire website. Jon Hosier also resigned publicly on the Socialist Unity website.

Letters condemning the handling of Comrade W's and X's cases were published by Leeds and Sussex Socialist Workers Student Society (SWSS) branches.

Callinicos said in 2014 that around 700 members had resigned.

In May 2024, the SWP issued a statement on the events of 2013. RS21, founded by people who split from the SWP in 2013, questioned the timing. Weekly Worker also criticised the delayed apology.

== Responses to the scandal from the press ==
The crisis attracted extensive media coverage. Laurie Penny wrote about the scandal in the New Statesman and The Guardian. Richard Seymour, Owen Jones, and Shiv Malik & Nick Cohen also covered the story.

SWP member Julie Sherry responded to some reporting in The Guardian.

New Statesman later published a long-form retrospective on the crisis.

== Later repercussions ==
Twelve SWP members in the Tyneside branch resigned in April 2020 over alleged failures to address misogyny, saying: “leadership has clearly learnt nothing from their handling of the Comrade Delta case”.

In October 2024, Bristol SWP and SWSS de-affiliated, citing the party's handling of Smith's case and additional allegations of racism and homophobia. The group alleged that members who had supported Smith remained in leadership and that a prominent current member was in a relationship with Smith.
