= Love Music Hate Racism =

British anti-racism campaign

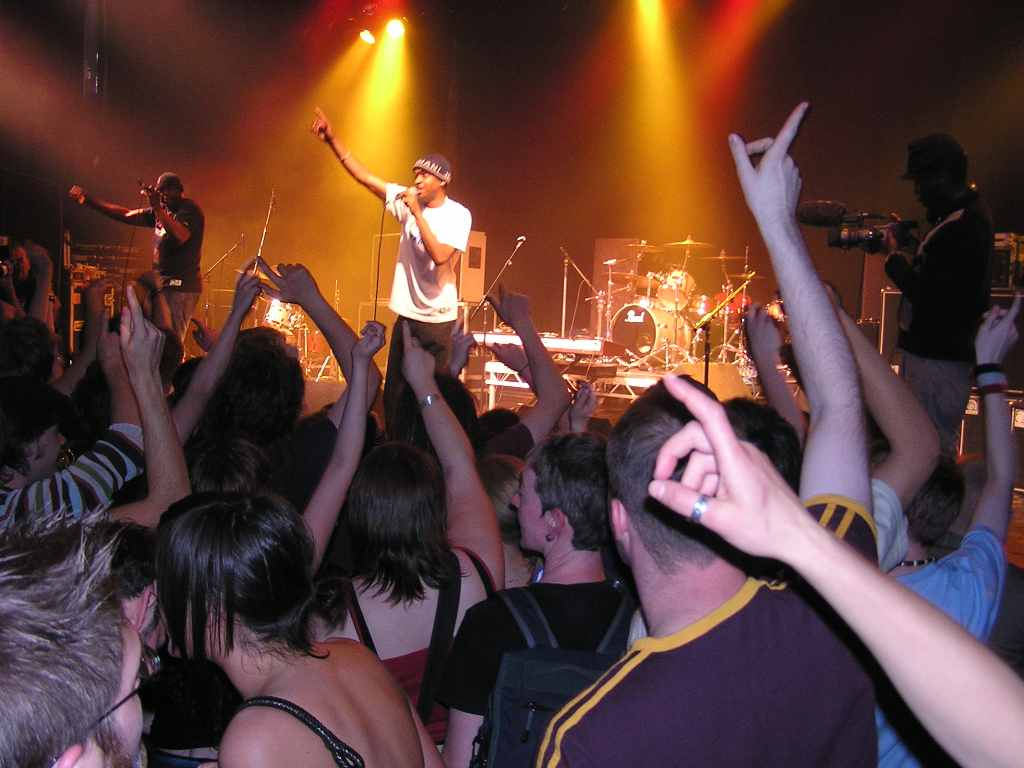
- Love Music Hate Racism concert in northwest England in 2004
- Type: Anti-racism music campaign
- Headquarters: United Kingdom
- Website: lovemusichateracism.com

Love Music Hate Racism (LMHR) is a music-oriented antiracism campaign based in Britain. The campaign aims to bring people together and promote unity through the power of music. LMHR was born in the tradition of the Rock Against Racism (RAR) movement of the late 1970s. The campaign held many successful festivals in the early 2000s such as a Victoria Park carnival and at Stoke Britannia Stadium, at which tens of thousands of people attended and international artists performed.

It is closely associated with Unite Against Fascism (UAF)/Stand Up To Racism (SUTR), the successors of the Anti-Nazi League (ANL); ANL co-founder Paul Holborow described LMHR, UAF and SUTR as "stand[ing] in [the ANL's] tradition."

Co-founder Weyman Bennet, co-convenor for Stand Up to Racism and member of the Socialist Workers Party (UK) central committee, is listed as an officer of the organisation at Companies House, alongside Kevin Courtney former joint General Secretary of the National Education Union and Clare Moseley of Care4Calais.

== Organisation ==
LMHR is a broad-based campaign made up of antiracism campaigners, musicians, music industry professionals and educators. It has local groups in towns and cities around Britain. Its current spokespeople include Atlantic Records VP Paul Samuels, and in the past have included its convener and national organiser, and former Socialist Workers Party National Secretary Martin Smith and Zak Cochrane.

== History ==
LMHR was set up in 2002 in response to the perceived increase in support for the far right British National Party. The first big LMHR concert was a festival in Manchester's Platt Fields Park, headlined by Doves and Ms. Dynamite.

Over the years it has gained the support of several acts in the UK of varying genres, including rock acts such as Ed Sheeran, Pete Doherty and Blood Red Shoes, grime acts like Roll Deep and Lowkey, punk rock acts like the King Blues, and jazz musicians like Courtney Pine. Due to this breadth and due to the organisation's belief that society's diversity is reflected in music, most LMHR concerts include several music genres.

In October 2007 LMHR ran a campaign in the music magazine, NME. In December 2007 the campaign announced that it would mark the 30th anniversary of the RAR/ANL carnival and procession with a similar event in Victoria Park on 27 April 2008.

The singer Morrissey donated money to the organisation in 2007 and again in 2008 to enable its Victoria Park event to go ahead, although in 2010 LMHR spokesperson Martin Smith said it would no longer accept his donations after he made an allegedly racist comment about Chinese people.

In 2018, John McDonnell, Diane Abbott, Kate Osamor and other prominent figures signed a statement calling for support for the organisation, alongside its sibling organisations Unite Against Fascism and Stand Up To Racism.

Love Music Hate Racism is launching a campaign called '#BeautifulResistance' to run for a fortnight between 8–22 March 2019 involving co-ordinated activities across the music industry including music labels, promoters, venues, music press, festivals, footballers, artists, managers and more.

In 2024, Love Music Hate Racism was announced to be relaunching with a gig on September 6 at Koko in Camden. Paloma Faith is set to perform, alongside reggae and soul-influenced singer-songwriter Liam Bailey, reggae and dub DJ Rebel Clash and Southport-born singer-songwriter Lapsley.

Weyman Bennett (Stand Up to Racism) said:

“This summer saw the far right have the confidence to run riot and instil fear in our communities.

“Mass anti-racist resistance turned the tide. But we need to continue to create a movement big and diverse enough to overcome the racism and division.

“That’s why Love Music Hate Racism is relaunching, to be a cultural force against the far right that promotes a simple message: there is more that unites us than divides us — and nothing demonstrates this more than music.”
