= Duncan Hallas =

British politician

Duncan Hallas (23 December 1925 – 19 September 2002) was a prominent member of the Trotskyist movement and a leading member of the Socialist Workers Party in Great Britain.

== Biography ==
Born into a working-class family in Manchester, Duncan Hallas joined the Young Communist League at the age of 14 in 1939 but soon became disillusioned owing to the Molotov–Ribbentrop Pact. In 1940, he met a woman selling Socialist Appeal at an Engineering Apprentices College where he was on day release and he joined the Trotskyist Workers International League in 1940 and then its successor organisation the Revolutionary Communist Party while still a young worker during the Second World War. Conscripted into the South Lancashire Regiment in 1943, he served in France, Belgium and Germany and he was also involved in the mutiny in Egypt after the end of the war, earning him three months in military prison. When factional disputes broke out in The Club (the name adopted by British Trotskyists after entering the Labour Party) Hallas became a supporter of Tony Cliff's positions.

Hallas was a founder member of the tiny Socialist Review Group when it was organised in 1951 and wrote its only major founding document not authored by Cliff, "On the Stalinist Parties". He also wrote a number of articles for the early issues of Socialist Review. After his job took him to Scotland in 1954/55 he effectively dropped out of the group, although he remained politically active in the National Union of Teachers and elsewhere.

With the upsurge in left-wing political activity in 1968 Hallas joined the International Socialists (IS) and rapidly became a member of the group's leadership and a full-time worker at its headquarters. However, Hallas, along with some other leading members, became concerned about Tony Cliff's increasing tendency to take decisions without consulting leadership bodies. Hallas initiated an oppositional group alongside John Palmer and Jim Higgins. However, when this oppositional group became a formal faction, the International Socialist Opposition (ISO), Hallas broke with it. He remained within the IS when the ISO's members were expelled, becoming a leading figure in its successor organisation, the Socialist Workers Party, until his retirement from active politics, owing to ill health, in 1995.

Hallas was the author of many articles for the publications of the IS/SWP group and of a short guide to the politics of Leon Trotsky.

== Publications ==
=== Books ===
- Trotsky’s Marxism (Pluto Press, London 1979)
- The Comintern (Bookmarks, London 1985)

=== Pamphlets ===
- Trotsky (Socialist Worker, 1970)
- The Meaning of Marxism (Pluto Press on behalf of the International Socialists, 1971)
- The Labour Party: Myth and Reality (Socialist Workers' Party, 1981)
- Why Import Controls Won't Save Jobs with Nigel Harris, (SWP pamphlet, 1981)
- Days of Hope: General Strike of 1926 with Chris Harman, (Socialist Worker, 1982)

=== Selected articles ===
- "Towards a Revolutionary Socialist Party" (1971)
- "The First Shop Stewards' Movement" (International Socialism, December 1973)
- "The Communist Party and the General Strike" (International Socialism, May 1976)
- "The Soviet Union State Capitalist or Socialist?" with Peter Binns (International Socialism, September 1976)
- "Introduction to Trotsky’s The Lessons of October" (1987)
- "The Bourgeois Revolution" (Socialist Review, 1988)
- "Introduction to Lenin’s “Left Wing” Communism" (1993)
- "Swimming Against the Tide (interview)" (Revolutionary History, 2001)
