= International Socialism (journal) =

British quarterly journal

- Editor: Joseph Choonara
- Former editors: Michael Kidron, Nigel Harris, Duncan Hallas, Chris Harman, John Rees, Alex Callinicos
- Categories: Politics
- Frequency: Quarterly
- First issue: 1958; 68 years ago
- Country: United Kingdom
- Language: English
- Website: www.isj.org.uk
- ISSN: 1754-4653

International Socialism is a British-based quarterly journal established in 1960 and published in London by the Socialist Workers Party, which discusses socialist theory. It is currently edited by Joseph Choonara who replaced Alex Callinicos, who took over for ten years in November 2009 after Chris Harman died.

The current journal is the second series following an earlier series which ran from 1960 to 1978 publishing a total of 104 issues. Originally edited by Michael Kidron for its first five years, with Alasdair MacIntyre co-editing it alongside him for 18 months, subsequently the first series was variously edited by Nigel Harris, Chris Harman, Duncan Hallas and Alex Callinicos. The second series was originally edited by Peter Binns, who was succeeded as editor by John Rees. Previously, a single issue of a duplicated journal of this name had been published in 1958 and the first edition of Tony Cliff's essay on Rosa Luxemburg was published, in book form, as issue 2/3 in series with this otherwise one-off publication.
