= Martin Smith (activist) =

British political activist (born 1963)

Martin James Smith (born October 1963) is a British political activist and former National Secretary of the Socialist Workers Party (SWP), a position he held from 2004 until January 2011, and who left the party in 2013 following an internal controversy.

== Political and organisational activity ==
=== Early involvement and SWP leadership ===
Smith joined the SWP in the 1980s and eventually became a member of the Central Committee. He served as National Secretary of the SWP from 2004 until January 2011. At the National Conference in January 2011, he left the post in favour of Charlie Kimber.

=== Campaigns and activism ===
He was involved in disrupting talks at Acas in May 2010 between British Airways and the Unite trade union, an action he defended on Channel 4 News. He has also been involved at a senior level in the party's campaigns, including Unite Against Fascism and Love Music Hate Racism. In September 2010, he was convicted of assaulting a police officer during a protest in October 2009 against British National Party leader Nick Griffin's appearance on Question Time. He was sentenced to a 12-month community order.

=== SWP crisis and departure ===
In 2013, the SWP faced an internal crisis after leaked minutes of a party disputes committee were reported in the press, including by The Independent, concerning allegations that a senior member, referred to as "Comrade Delta", had committed rape and sexual assault. Subsequent reporting identified "Comrade Delta" as Martin Smith. According to Alex Callinicos and Dave Renton, internal disagreement over the case led to the departure of several hundred members. According to The Guardian, Smith left the SWP in 2013 following the allegations.

=== Publishing roles ===
Smith is a former director of Sherborne Publications Limited, the company that publishes the Socialist Worker, and of Love Music Hate Racism.

== Selected publications ==
- John Coltrane: Jazz, racism and resistance, the extended version. Redwords, 2003. ISBN 9781872208220
- Frank Sinatra: When ole blue eyes was a red. London: Bookmarks Publications, 2005. ISBN 9781905192021
- Why "British jobs for British workers" won't solve the crisis: Why we need jobs for all. London: Bookmarks Publications, 2009. ISBN 9781905192489
