= Unite Against Fascism =

British anti-fascist group

- Abbreviation: UAF
- Formation: 2003; 23 years ago
- Type: Anti-fascist
- Headquarters: London, England
- Key people: Chair – Steve Hart, political officer, Unite; Vice chair – Christine Blower, general secretary, NUT; Vice chair – Hugh Lanning, deputy general secretary, PCS; Vice chair – Azad Ali; Vice chair – Jennifer Moses, national official for equality and training, NASUWT; Treasurer – Jane Loftus, president, CWU; Joint secretary – Weyman Bennett; Joint secretary – Sabby Dhalu; Assistant secretary – Brian Richardson; Parliamentary Officer – Peter Hain, Baron Hain; European officer – Claude Moraes (former MEP); European officer – Glyn Ford

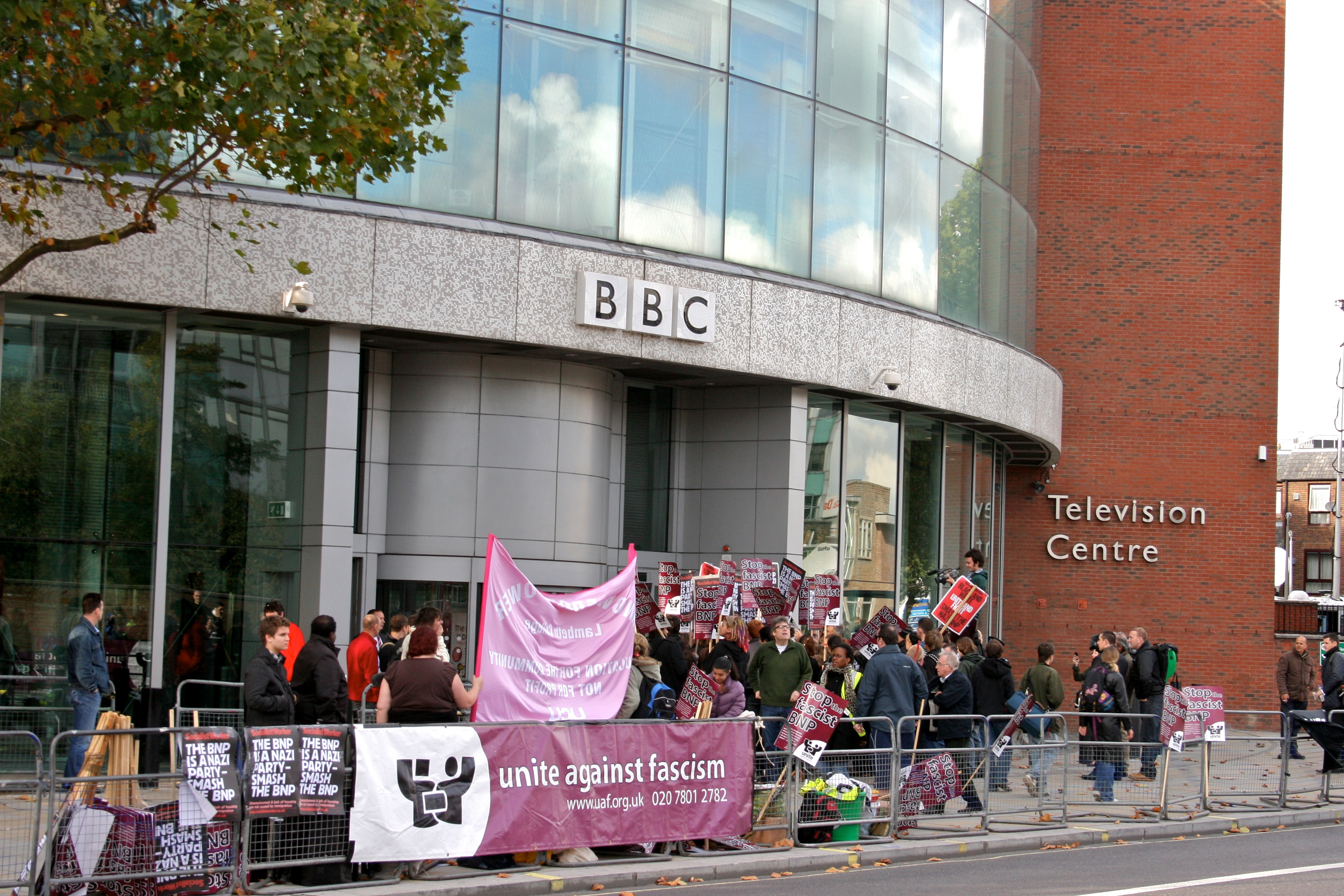
UAF members outside the BBC Television Centre protesting against the appearance of BNP leader Nick Griffin on Question Time.

Unite Against Fascism (UAF) is a British anti-fascist group formed in 2003 as a merger between the Anti-Nazi League and the National Assembly Against Racism (NAAR).

Its joint secretaries are Weyman Bennett, of the Socialist Workers Party, and Sabby Dhalu, formerly of NAAR. Its chair is Steve Hart of Unite the Union and its assistant secretary was the late Jude Woodward of Socialist Action.

Since 2013, UAF has mainly operated in partnership with its sister organisation Stand Up To Racism, which has many of the same officers as UAF: Bennett and Dhalu as joint secretaries, Diane Abbott as president and co-chairs Dave Ward of the Communication Workers' Union and Talha Ahmad of the Muslim Council of Britain.

== History ==
Unite Against Fascism (UAF) was formed in Great Britain in late 2003 in response to electoral successes by the British National Party (BNP). Its main elements were the Anti-Nazi League and the National Assembly Against Racism, with the support of the Trades Union Congress (TUC) and leading British unions such as the Transport and General Workers' Union (T&G) (now Unite) and UNISON. According to Red Pepper magazine, UAF was set up by the Socialist Workers Party and the National Assembly Against Racism. Among the union leaders backing UAF were Billy Hayes of the Communication Workers Union, Andy Gilchrist and Mick Shaw of the Fire Brigades Union, Mark Serwotka of the PCS public service workers' union, and Christine Blower and Kevin Courtney of the NUT. Founding signatories included David Cameron, later Prime Minister of the United Kingdom. Until 2013, SWP national organiser Martin Smith played a leading role in the organisation.

In 2005, the anti-fascist magazine Searchlight disaffiliated from UAF after an argument over tactics to defeat the BNP. At UAF's 2007 national conference, speakers ranged from cabinet minister Peter Hain to Edie Friedman of the Jewish Council for Racial Equality and Muhammad Abdul Bari of the Muslim Council of Britain (MCB), as well as figures from the major UK trade unions. At UAF's 2009 national conference, Bari was again a guest speaker. In 2012, Smith's position as UAF's assistant secretary was unsuccessfully challenged at its annual conference, and Azad Ali, of Islamic Forum of Europe was elected vice-chair.

UAF has worked closely with Love Music Hate Racism, described by UAF/SWP's Weyman Bennett as "the cultural wing of our movement".

=== Protests against the British National Party and English Defence League ===
In November 2007, UAF organised a rally of over 1,000 people when BNP leader Nick Griffin and Holocaust denier David Irving spoke at the Oxford Union. On 9 June 2009, UAF demonstrated against a BNP press conference given by Griffin and Andrew Brons outside the Palace of Westminster following their election as MEPs. Demonstrators marched towards the group with placards, chanting anti-Nazi slogans, and threw eggs at Griffin, forcing the abandonment of the press conference. Members of the press were also hit. The protesters also kicked Griffin's car and beat it with placards as he was led away from the scene. Two members of the public were hospitalised as a result of the demonstration. Griffin claimed that the attack was carried out with the backing of the Labour Party.

The following day, UAF demonstrated at the BNP's next attempt to hold a press conference at a pub in Miles Platting, North Manchester. They chanted anti-fascist slogans and tried to drown out Griffin by playing Bob Marley songs at high volume. One protester was arrested after spitting in the direction of a car belonging to a BNP member.

In January 2010, when the Pendle branch of the UAF removed a wreath from a war memorial in Nelson, Lancashire, that had been laid down by Councillor Adam Grant, a veteran and BNP politician, Richard MacSween of the Pendle UAF said, "The BNP have left a wreath and we have removed it because we don't approve of fascism." In response, Labour Councillor George Adam, from the Nelson and District branch of the Royal British Legion, said, "I'm annoyed – they have no right to remove that wreath. The BNP is a legitimate political party and they have a right to lay down a wreath just as any other members of the public do." BNP Councillor Brian Parker added, "It's disgusting, and it's theft."

After 2010, UAF's focus increasingly turned from the BNP to the English Defence League (EDL). At its 2012 conference, UAF debated whether it should call for state bans on the EDL (as advocated by Socialist Action) but this was rejected (as advocated by the SWP).

=== Later activities ===
In 2020, during the resurgence of Black Lives Matter, Stand Up To Racism launched a doorstop "take knee" campaign.

== Arrests and violence ==
On 19 August 2009, police arrested 19 protesters during a demonstration by UAF against the BNP's Red, White and Blue Festival in Codnor, Derbyshire. Four people were charged, three with public order offences and one with unlawfully obstructing the highway.

On 22 October 2009, the UAF demonstration against BNP leader Nick Griffin's appearance on the BBC's Question Time programme resulted in injuries to three police officers. UAF national officer and (then) SWP National Secretary Martin Smith was found guilty of assaulting one of the police officers at South Western Magistrates' Court, London, on 7 September 2010. He was sentenced to a 12-month community order, with 80 hours' unpaid work, and was fined £450 pending an appeal.

On 20 March 2010, demonstrations from UAF and the English Defence League (EDL) in Bolton led to violent confrontations and the arrest of at least 55 UAF supporters, including the UAF protest organiser Weyman Bennett, on suspicion of conspiracy to commit violent disorder. At least three EDL supporters were also arrested, and two UAF members were taken to hospital with a minor head and a minor ear injury. After Bennett was charged and released, he accused the police of being hostile to anti-racists and called for an inquiry into the police's actions that day. The police, while criticising the EDL for "vitriolic name-calling" blamed people predominantly associated with UAF for provoking violence and said that they "acted with, at times, extreme violence". All charges against Bennett were eventually dropped. In response to this news he was quoted as saying, "This is a victory for anti-fascists and for the right to protest. I'm proud to say that the threat of these charges has not deterred any of us from continuing to stand up against the EDL. I can now continue my work without this serious false allegation hanging over me. It is imperative we continue to protest to protect our multi-racial communities."

On 30 August 2010, violence occurred in Brighton, East Sussex, during a UAF protest against a march organised by a group called the English Nationalist Alliance. A spokesman for the police, who were attempting to keep 250 protesters and marchers apart, said, "Unfortunately a small group from the counter-demonstration [UAF] resisted this and threw missiles at the police." There were fourteen arrests during the violence.

On 2 June 2013, 58 anti-fascist demonstrators were arrested by police under Section 14 of the Public Order Act for failing to move up the street away from a BNP demonstration outside the Houses of Parliament against what the BNP describe as Islamic "hate preachers". Of the 58, only five were charged and their cases were dismissed at Westminster Magistrates' Court in April 2014. The police had earlier banned the BNP from marching from Woolwich Barracks to the Houses of Parliament, fearing violence.

== Criticism ==
In 2006, journalist David Tate argued that the Socialist Workers Party (SWP) was seeking to dominate the UAF, and a 2014 report in the New Statesman described it as a "front" for the SWP. The same criticism has been made of UAF's sister organisation Stand Up To Racism. For example, in 2020 the women's and BME officers of Cambridge University Students Union accused Stand Up To Racism (SUTR) of being a "front for the Socialist Workers’ Party, an organisation which systematically covers up sexual violence", and attempting "to co-opt the work of black organisers and the Black Lives Matter movement in order to rehabilitate their own reputation and recruit members", and urged students to refuse any SUTR materials at protests. Vice-chair Steve Hart of Unite the Union rejected the claim that it is an SWP front.

David Toube of the Jewish Leadership Council asserts that the organisations involved in the UAF avoid condemnation of antisemitism. The LGBT rights activist Peter Tatchell has accused UAF of a selective approach to bigotry: "UAF commendably opposes the BNP and EDL but it is silent about Islamist fascists who promote anti-Semitism, homophobia, sexism and sectarian attacks on non-extremist Muslims (see also Islam and violence). It is time the UAF campaigned against the Islamist far right as well as against the EDL and BNP far right."

The journalist Andrew Gilligan has claimed that the UAF's reluctance to tackle Islamism is because several of its own members are supporters of such extremism. The UAF's vice-chairman, Azad Ali, is also community affairs co-ordinator of the Islamic Forum of Europe, which Gilligan describes as "a Muslim supremacist group dedicated to changing 'the very infrastructure of society, its institutions, its culture, its political order and its creed from ignorance to Islam'". Nigel Copsey, Professor of Modern History at Teesside University, wrote that Ali's association with IFE made UAF "[run] the risk of turning a blind eye to Islamist extremism". Ali was suspended as a civil servant in the Treasury after he wrote approvingly on his blog of an Islamic militant who said that as a Muslim he is religiously obliged to kill British soldiers in Iraq, in 2009. According to Gilligan, Michael Adebolajo, one of the murderers of Lee Rigby in 2013, spoke "on the margins" of a 2009 UAF demonstration in Harrow. Secretary Weyman Bennett responded by saying that Adebolajo was not an official speaker.
