= Question Time British National Party controversy =

2009 Controversy

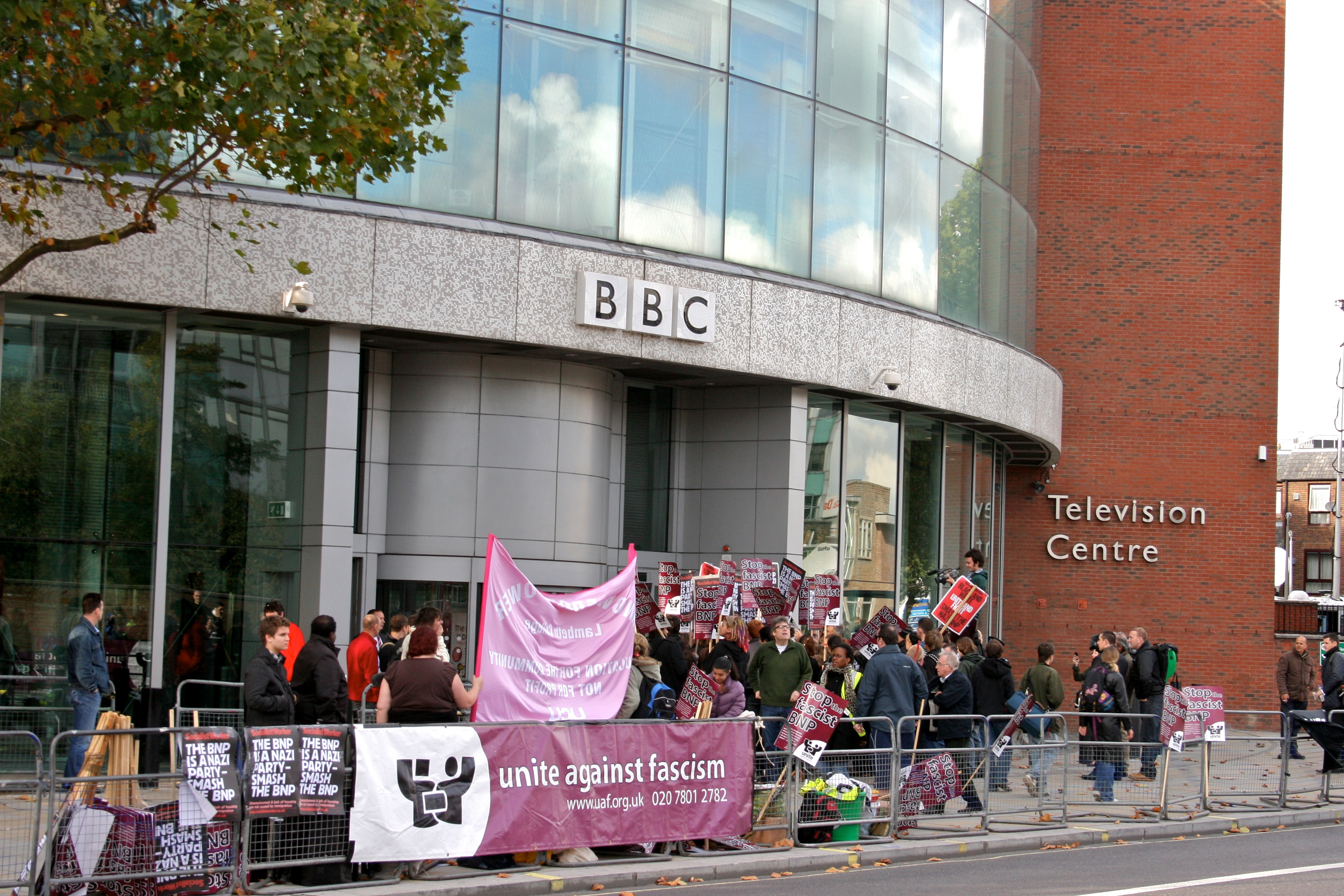
- Protesters from Unite Against Fascism and other organisations gather outside the BBC Television Centre in London before the episode of Question Time
- Date: September–October 2009
- Location: BBC Television Centre, Shepherd's Bush, London
- Participants: Nick Griffin, BBC, British National Party, UK political parties, UK media, Anti-BNP protesters

The Question Time British National Party controversy occurred in September and October 2009, due to an invitation by the British Broadcasting Corporation (BBC) to Nick Griffin, leader of the far-right British National Party (BNP), to be a panelist on Question Time, one of its flagship television programmes on current affairs.

The decision to have the BNP represented on the programme for the first time sparked public and political debate in the United Kingdom. At the heart of the matter was the BBC's public broadcasting mandate, requiring it to give equal prominence to political parties above a given level of electoral representation. Mark Thompson, Director-General of the BBC, defended the BBC's decision to invite Griffin, stating, "the BNP has demonstrated a level of support that would normally lead to an occasional invitation to join the panel on Question Time. It is for that reason – not for some misguided desire to be controversial, but for that reason alone – that the invitation has been extended."

A late appeal was made to the BBC Trust, the BBC's governing body, by the Secretary of State for Wales Peter Hain, to have the appearance blocked, which ultimately failed. Griffin appeared on the edition which aired on 22 October 2009. As the programme was due to go on air, public protests took place at BBC Television Centre in London. The pre-recorded programme featured Griffin alongside the Secretary of State for Justice Jack Straw; the Conservative peer and Shadow Minister for Community Cohesion Sayeeda Warsi, Baroness Warsi; the Liberal Democrats' Home Affairs spokesperson Chris Huhne; and the writer/playwright Bonnie Greer. The edition was watched by over 8 million people – over half the total audience share – and more than double the previous record high for Question Time.

== Background ==
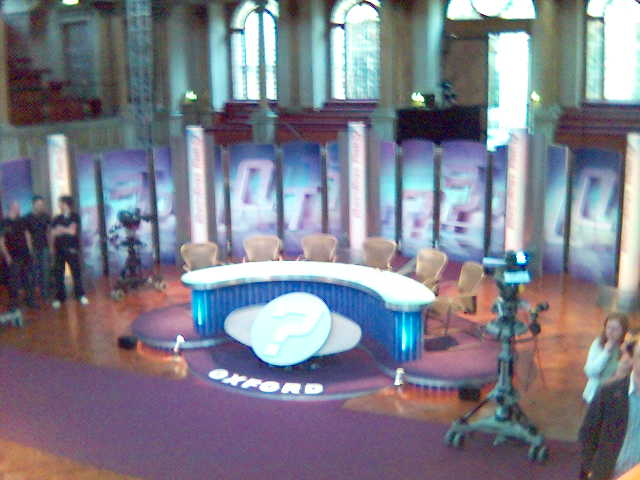
Question Time set in Oxford

Question Time is the flagship BBC Television political panel show, which began in 1979. The weekly show, then hosted by David Dimbleby since 1994, takes place at locations around the country. Questions from a local audience are directed to a panel of invited guests, usually consisting of British politicians, alongside other public figures. The topics for debate during the programme are loosely defined by "set-piece" questions from pre-selected audience members. For each topic, the question is answered by each panel member in turn, followed by supplementary questions on the topic, time permitting. The show is pre-recorded a few hours before being broadcast, and it is stressed by Dimbleby as the programme starts, that the panellists have no previous knowledge of the content of the questions.

The British National Party (BNP) is a far right minority party in Britain founded by John Tyndall in 1982. The leader of the party at the time was Nick Griffin, elected as one of the eight MEPs in the North West England constituency, although he has since resigned as party leader. At the time of the programme, the BNP won 943,598 votes and two seats in the UK's 2009 European Parliament elections in June, where a total of 72 seats were contested. The BNP polled 6.26% of the national vote of 15,625,823 (from an electorate of 45,315,669), making it the sixth ranked party, behind the Conservatives (27.7%), UK Independence Party (16.5%), Labour (15.7%), Liberal Democrats (13.7%) and the Green Party (8.6%). The result represented a 1.3 percentage point increase on its previous performance. Since then, support for the party has declined significantly, allegedly due "to internal splits and the rise of UKIP".

At the time of the programme the BNP held one seat on the London Assembly and council seats in four London boroughs; it was the second party in the London Borough of Barking and Dagenham.

== BBC policy ==
=== Coverage of the BNP ===
Nick Griffin had already appeared on other BBC shows, including The Andrew Marr Show on BBC One and The World at One on BBC Radio 4. No BNP representative had ever appeared on Question Time before, but following the European election performance, this stance was reviewed. The possibility of an appearance on Question Time by Griffin was publicly announced by the BBC in early September. That month, James Macintyre of the New Statesman who was a former Question Time producer, said that Mentorn, the independent production company responsible for Question Time, had been proposing an appearance by Griffin over the previous two years. The Independent gave credit to the BBC for resisting "the naïve showbiz instincts" of executives at Mentorn, who may have wanted "what Peter Hain calls a 'beanfest' for reasons well removed from the BBC's charter obligations."

On 21 October, the day before the broadcast, the BBC Director-General, Mark Thompson, wrote an article for The Guardian entitled "Keeping Nick Griffin off air is a job for parliament, not the BBC". He said that those arguing for the BNP to be excluded from the programme were making the case for censorship. He explained the BBC's decision:

Question Time is an opportunity for the British public to put questions to politicians of every ideological hue. Politicians from the UK's biggest parties appear most frequently, but from time to time representatives of parties with many fewer supporters – from the Scottish Socialists and Respect to the Green party – also take their seats on the stage. Question Time is the most prominent programme of its kind on British television, and we carefully study the support gained in elections by each of the parties, large and small, before deciding who to invite and how frequently they should appear. It is a straightforward matter of fact that, with some 6% of the vote and the election of two MEPs in this spring's European elections – and with some success in local elections as well – the BNP has demonstrated a level of support that would normally lead to an occasional invitation to join the panel on Question Time. It is for that reason – not for some misguided desire to be controversial, but for that reason alone – that the invitation has been extended.

The BBC Deputy Director General, Mark Byford, also defended the decision on the day of the programme, saying: "[The BNP] should have the right to be heard, be challenged, and for the public who take part in Question Time and the viewers to make up their own minds about the views of the BNP. It's not for the BBC to censor and say they can't be on". The BBC's chief political adviser, Ric Bailey, stated after the failed appeal that the BBC "would have been breaking its charter if it had not treated the BNP with impartiality ... We absolutely stand by that judgement, even though there's obviously been a lot of controversy about it". A senior BBC presenter, John Humphrys, said the decision was "absolutely right". He said: "Why should we be afraid of what they have to say? Free speech is the issue here, and the BBC's obligations." However, broadcasting unions said some of its members would protest at the invitation.

=== Appeal to the BBC Trust ===
A late attempt to stop the programme came from the Labour Secretary of State for Wales, Peter Hain, who accused the BBC of being "apologists" for the BNP and making "one of the biggest mistakes in its proud history". After failing to persuade the BBC Director General Mark Thompson to stop the appearance, Hain appealed to the BBC Trust. The BNP's constitution restricting membership of the party to "indigenous Caucasian" people, namely "indigenous British ethnic groups" including the "Anglo-Saxon folk community" and the "Celtic Scottish folk community" was declared illegal on 15 October 2009 under the Race Relations Act, after a challenge by the Equality and Human Rights Commission, and Hain argued that the appearance might be illegal in light of the ruling.

On the night of Tuesday 20 October, the Trust announced it was forming an emergency committee, comprising three trustees chaired by Richard Tait, to examine the appeals. Late on 21 October, the day before the programme was due to be made, the Trust cleared Griffin to appear on the show. It also ruled that, given the pre-recorded nature of the show, many of the concerns were hypothetical and premature. The Trust declined further comment, in case of an appeal of the decision after the show:

We have concluded that the decision as to whether it is appropriate in all the circumstances for the BBC to allow the BNP to participate on Question Time is a question of editorial judgement, which the charter and framework agreement reserve for the Director-General.

We have written to the Director-General asking him to engage personally to ensure that the broadcast programme complies with the general law, the BBC's editorial guidelines and all other regulatory requirements.

The committee is aware of the debate and public controversy on this issue and that this is a matter of considerable importance to many licence fee payers.

== Opinions prior to broadcast ==
=== Nick Griffin ===
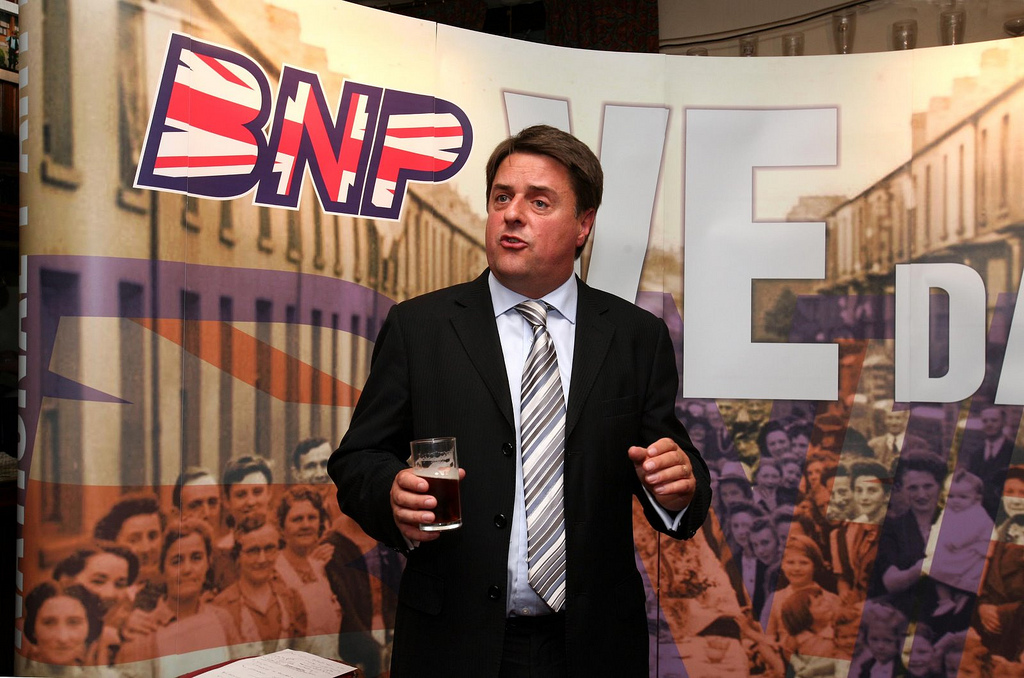
BNP leader Nick Griffin

In preparation for his appearance on Question Time, Griffin researched the first appearance of Sinn Féin's Gerry Adams. In an e-mail to BNP supporters, Griffin said "Never before have we had the chance to present our patriotic, common sense solutions to Britain's nightmare situation to the public at large in such prominent fashion ... I am relishing this opportunity, and I know that ... the ordinary members, supporters and voters of the BNP will be in the studio with me as I take on the corrupt, treacherous swine destroying our beautiful island nation." Contrasting to Griffin's earlier 2001 appearance on HARDtalk and later appearances on Newsnight with Jeremy Paxman, Griffin claimed that he was non-combative in his Question Time appearance in order to gain sympathy from the viewers via a "root-for-the-underdog mentality". He had expected to salvage his reputation by appearing as a panellist on future editions of the programme, which did not materialise. However, he also stated in a letter on the BNP website: "I will, no doubt, be interrupted, shouted down, slandered, put on the spot, and subjected to a scrutiny that would be a thousand times more intense than anything directed at other panellists. It will, in other words, be political blood sport. But I am relishing this opportunity."

Griffin told The Times: "I thank the political class and their allies for being so stupid." He went on to say that his invitation on the programme "clearly gives us a whole new level of public recognition." Griffin said of his fellow Question Time panellists before the show that Bonnie Greer was "the joker in the pack... [who]... knows how to look after herself and may be more of a handful than the others", that Menzies Campbell "would have been more daunting" than Chris Huhne, that Jack Straw is "a very effective advocate". He said that the appearance of Baroness Warsi for the Conservatives was a typical "tokenist" stunt. In the run-up to the programme, the BNP website displayed a prominent countdown to Question Time.

=== UK parliamentary parties ===
The policy of the Labour Party never to share a platform with the BNP was changed following the BBC's invitation to Griffin. Labour said that future appearances were to be on a "case by case" basis. On 27 September 2009, the Secretary of State for Justice, Jack Straw, announced he would appear on the programme, following the announcement that the Conservatives and Liberal Democrats would take part in any edition of Question Time that included the BNP. Straw said he would be delighted to make the argument for people against the BNP:

Wherever we have had BNP problems in my area and when we have fought them hard, we've pulled back and won the seats back.

Speaking on the Question Time episode the week before the expected appearance by Griffin, the Home Secretary Alan Johnson condemned the decision of the BBC:

There isn't a constitutional obligation to appear on Question Time. That gives [the BNP] a legitimacy they do not deserve. These people believe in the things that the fascists believed in the Second World War, they believe in what the National Front believe in. They believe in the purity of the Aryan race. It is a foul and despicable party.

The Prime Minister and Labour leader, Gordon Brown, said he would not interfere with the BBC's decision. He said: "asked about their racist and bigoted views that are damaging to good community relations, it will be a good opportunity to expose what they are about." When pressed on the reversal of Labour's 'No Platform' policy, Brown said "The issue is: should we have someone there? Jack Straw is a very experienced person who has had to deal with the BNP and their awful politics over a period of time."

The Conservative leader, David Cameron, was uncomfortable with the BBC decision, which reminded him of an invitation to Gerry Adams to speak at the Oxford Union during the 1980s when he was at Oxford. He said: "It makes me uneasy. I don't think the BBC should have done it."

The Conservative panel member, Baroness Warsi, a British Muslim from Dewsbury, West Yorkshire – a town which Janice Turner of The Times reported as having the biggest BNP vote in Britain – stated "I want to ask Nick Griffin what about me isn't British". The Liberal Democrat panel member Chris Huhne decided in consultation with his party leader Nick Clegg that, given the BBC's decision to invite Griffin, he had no choice but to attend. He said that "Thursday night's excitement would not have been called off just because the Liberal Democrats decided not to participate."

On the day of the programme, the former Labour Mayor of London, Ken Livingstone, said that the BBC would "bear moral responsibility" for any rise in racist attacks in Britain. The Labour MP Diane Abbott, the first black woman to be elected to Parliament, believed that the appearance of Griffin would signal the BNP was part of the political mainstream in the same way that her appearance on Question Time in 1987 had signalled black people's acceptance as part of the mainstream. She said: "It's not a programme that's going to scrutinise his views, it's not that sort of programme, it's politics as entertainment". Andy Slaughter, a Labour MP whose constituency includes the BBC Television Centre, arrived to support the protests, scathingly attacking the BBC's "smugness", saying that local people on the estates were "utterly affronted".

Ten MPs signed an early day motion tabled by the Labour MP Mike Gapes which called the BBC decision "profoundly wrong" and noted that "no previous BBC Director General made such a judgement and that neither Martin Webster, who polled 16 per cent of the vote in the West Bromwich by-election in 1973, John Tyndall, Colin Jordan or Oswald Mosley were treated in the same way".

=== Other views ===
The decision by the BBC to invite Griffin on to Question Time caused widespread controversy. In an editorial on 15 October 2009, The Guardian said: "The BNP is no normal party – yet by inviting it on to Question Time, the BBC runs the risk of normalising it". It also stated that it would give the BNP "its best-ever platform for its poisonous politics".

Jim Shields, associate professor in French Studies at Warwick University, stated that the appearance would be "a real milestone" in Griffin's acceptability. He said that the far-right leader Jean-Marie Le Pen's appearance on a similar programme in France saw support for his Front national party "double overnight". Professor Ted Cantle, commissioned by the Government to investigate the 2001 Oldham riots, urged a "more sophisticated approach" using reasoned arguments, to defeat the far right.

The anti-fascist magazine Searchlight said that entry level for inclusion on BBC programmes should be "election to the national parliament". Muhammad Abdul Bari, the Secretary General of the Muslim Council of Britain, said "We regret the BBC's decision. There is a general fear that allowing the BNP to air its toxic views will increase Islamophobia and give the BNP the aura of respectability needed to spread its message of hate".

On 21 October, Iain Martin wrote in a The Wall Street Journal blog that the appearance on Question Time signalled that the mainstream political parties in Britain had "badly let down their fellow Britons...by setting narrow terms for the national debate which exclude the concerns of millions of voters and force them out on to the fringes". Similarly, the issue of Griffin's upcoming appearance was the headline story on BBC Two's Newsnight the previous evening. It was dealt with in a segment on social decline in Britain and the perceived failings of the major parties.

On the morning of the programme, the leading article in The Times said that the BBC were right to invite Griffin, but that the issue of his appearance should not be allowed to dominate the programme, and that the panel and its chairman should be "well briefed on Mr Griffin's many unsavoury comments on topics such as immigration". Richard Preston, blogging for The Daily Telegraph, compared the importance of Griffin's appearance with past infrequent Question Time panellists such as comedians Eddie Izzard, Norman Pace and Jim Davidson, while also expressing confidence that the hour-long show and David Dimbleby would provide enough scrutiny to expose Griffin if he was a "lightweight" or a "bluffer"; he suggested that "Britain truly does have problems" if a trio of mainstream politicians did not manage to take him apart.

== Broadcast ==
=== Panel ===
The panel for the 22 October edition of Question Time consisted of:

- Bonnie Greer, writer, historian and playwright
- Nick Griffin, British National Party MEP for North West England and BNP Leader
- Chris Huhne, then Liberal Democrat MP for Eastleigh and the Home Affairs spokesperson
- Jack Straw, Labour MP for Blackburn and the then United Kingdom Justice Secretary
- Baroness Warsi, Conservative Life Peer and the then Shadow Minister for Community Cohesion and Social Action

=== Recording ===
Question Time was held in BBC Television Centre in London, for the first time in four years, to enable the police to keep order for Griffin's appearance. The audience was expected by The Times to number 200 people and to comprise a broad spectrum of political views, including BNP supporters and left-wing groups. The recording of the edition of 22 October was brought forward two hours from the usual 8.30 pm start time to allow for any disruption, before being broadcast later the same night.

Filming started shortly before 7.00 pm, and ended at around 8.30 pm; Griffin left the building 10 minutes later. Audience members inside the studios used their mobile phones to relay live information about the recording's progress. James Lyons, political correspondent for the Daily Mirror, wrote that the mood in the studio turned from anger to mockery of Griffin.

A full audience attended the making of the programme and there were no protests in the studio. One audience member suggested that a "half dozen" BNP members in the studio shouted encouragement to Griffin. The show was broadcast on BBC One at 10.35 pm (BST) and at 11.05 pm on BBC One Wales.

=== Protests ===
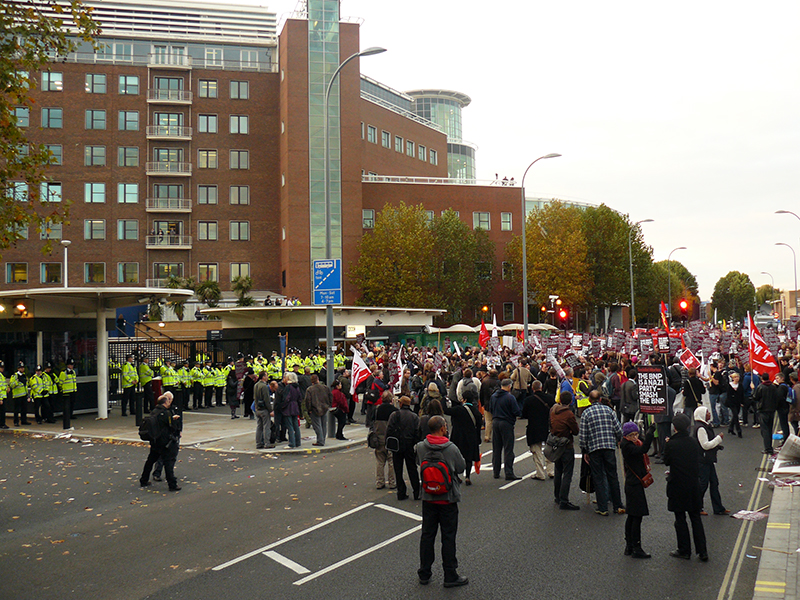
Protesters and police outside Television Centre

Demonstrations were planned to take place during the show. A protest rally by Unite Against Fascism (UAF) had been held in London on the night of Tuesday 20 October, and sixteen coachloads of UAF protesters were expected on the day. Amid concern over the safety of residents, Hammersmith and Fulham council asked for clarification of the BBC's security arrangements, and pushed for an alternative location. Although the protest organisers, UAF, rejected suggestions that the protests would be violent, security was stepped up at BBC Television Centre. Simon Darby of the BNP stated there would be no counter-demonstration. Griffin expressed fears over his safety for his arrival and departure. Extra officers of the Metropolitan Police were drafted in to maintain order outside the studios, while the BBC recruited an extra 60 security guards for inside the studio.

By mid-afternoon of the day of the programme, protesters had begun gathering outside Television Centre and there were also protesters outside regional BBC offices. By 4.30 pm (BST) police estimated there were 500 chanting protesters; around 25 people who reached the main entrance of Television Centre after breaking through a cordon were expelled. They were part of a group of about 40 people that had made a dash for an iron gate that had been left open. After this breach, stand-by officers reinforced the police cordon and protesters moved to block Wood Lane, hoping to prevent Griffin entering the studios. Griffin arrived at 5.17 pm unnoticed and entered on foot through a rear entrance on Frithville Road. It was reported that around 600 people had turned up to protest against Griffin.

Due to the various protests, Television Centre and other BBC buildings around the country were locked down until the protesters had dispersed. People arriving for recordings of other shows at Television Centre, such as Friday Night with Jonathan Ross, were turned away. Six people were arrested during the protests, reportedly for "offences including violent disorder, causing actual bodily harm, assault of a police officer and a person wanted on warrant"; three police officers were slightly injured. Martin Smith, a UAF national officer and, at the time, the Socialist Workers Party National Secretary, was later found guilty of assaulting the police officer at South Western Magistrates' Court, London, on 7 September 2010. He was sentenced to a 12-month community order, with 80 hours' unpaid work, and was fined £450 pending an appeal.

=== Questions ===
Five debate topics were initiated from audience questions during the programme: the BNP's campaign symbols, Islam, immigration policy, Jan Moir and finally, the show itself.

The topics were started with questions as follows (with notes detailing the approximate time into the broadcast the question occurred, the first panellist directed to respond to it by the moderator, and any background information to the question):

- "Given that the Second World War was fuelled by the need to disarm oppressive and racist regimes, is it fair that the BNP has hijacked Churchill as its own?" (1 minute in, Jack Straw) This question referenced the BNP's use of images of Winston Churchill, the Prime Minister during World War II, in its recent European election campaign.
- "Why is Islam a 'wicked and vicious' faith?" (21, Nick Griffin) Griffin, the question was in reference to a quotation attributed to him.
- "Can the recent success of the BNP be explained by the misguided immigration policy of the government?" (27, Jack Straw) Straw refused to answer this question.
- "Should the Daily Mail have published the Jan Moir article on Stephen Gately?" (50, Bonnie Greer) Referencing a recent newspaper article written by Daily Mail columnist Jan Moir about the recent death of the former Boyzone band member Stephen Gately, which sparked record complaints to the Press Complaints Commission.
- "Might this programme be viewed as an early Christmas present for the BNP?" (58, Chris Huhne) In reference to the prior comments of Peter Hain after the ruling of the BBC Trust that the programme could go ahead would represent "an early Christmas present" for the BNP.

=== Viewing figures ===
The previous record audience for Question Time was set during its 14 May 2009 edition in the wake of the MPs' expenses scandal, when 3.8 million watched. and The Guardian had estimated the broadcast might attract '3 million or so' viewers. The programme was watched by over 8 million people, the highest in the 30-year history of Question Time, and nearly triple the programme's normal audience of two to three million.

In terms of share of audience, the broadcast represented over 50% of the total audience share on the night. The Griffin edition squeezed the audience of Newsnight (BBC Two) to 300,000 viewers compared to its normal 700,000 to 1 million, while a repeat showing of Piers Morgan's Life Stories on ITV1 attracted 700,000 viewers, a 5% share. The Times noted that audience figures for the show led the BBC's weekly total, ahead of Strictly Come Dancing on Saturday night.

== Reception ==
=== Public comments ===
While both the BBC and its independent regulator Ofcom had expected a 'barrage' of complaints over the programme, Ofcom reported having received a "small number of complaints" about the programme by the following day, understood to be fewer than 100. By noon on Friday 23 October, the BBC had received 416 calls, 243 complaining of bias against Griffin, 114 complaining about Griffin being allowed to appear, and 59 in support of the BBC. The main complaints were reported to be that the programme had overly focused on the BNP, becoming the "Nick Griffin show". Ofcom was considering whether a formal investigation was warranted under the broadcast code section on harm and offence. After one week, Ofcom had received 290 complaints.

=== Panel view ===
Straw described Nick Griffin as a "fantasising conspiracy theorist with some very unpleasant views and no moral compass. But now that he has been exposed for what he is it is time to move on." Warsi said Griffin was "...very much exposed for the man that he is. When he was questioned on his views his face of extremism was exposed. He was given an opportunity to explain some of his policies and he couldn't". Huhne said, "This is a person who comes from a fascist background; anyone who watches the programme will see exactly what he stands for." Greer said Griffin had been "totally trounced" on the show, and that sitting next to Griffin had been "probably the weirdest and most creepy experience of my life". Nevertheless, Griffin perceived that he had "struck up a rapport" with Greer, who treated him differently from the other panellists. Greer avoided looking in Griffin's direction throughout, and indeed turned her back on him pointedly. Speaking to the Associated Press, Griffin stated that his appearance had secured the BNP's place on the national stage, and while not revolutionary, was like gaining a kind of "Boy Scout's badge". He was relatively pleased with having "been able to land a few punches of my own". Later, Griffin declared: "Millions of people are angry about the way I was treated." Describing the experience as a "lynch mob", he complained how the choice of London had made it hostile territory for him, and had prevented him from speaking on then-current events such as the postal strikes.

=== BNP view ===
On 23 October, the day after the broadcast, Griffin announced he would be lodging a formal complaint over the programme, over its focus on BNP issues rather than topical subjects. Griffin stated, "There is not much support for me there [in London], because the place is dominated by ethnic minorities. There is an ethnic minority that supports me: the English. But there's not many of them left." A spokesman for the BNP said that London was too "multicultural" to be fair to it and that a location like the northwest of England would have been more favourable. The BNP were also going to file a Freedom of Information Request to the BBC to determine the decision-making process behind hosting the programme in London, and in allowing the debate to focus on the BNP, arguing that criticism of the BNP had dominated the whole programme.

Griffin dismissed criticism of his performance, saying "people who have always been against the BNP will say that I couldn't answer some things." He was of the opinion that he had been shown "extraordinary hostility" by the main political parties, but that he was happy having done his best. Griffin said: "I can see that millions of people who don't usually watch Question Time will remember what I've said and think that's how they feel and I'm perfectly happy with that." He also said he expected the BNP would appear on Question Time again. The BNP legal officer, Lee Barnes, described Griffin's performance as "failing to press the attack", and the Evening Standard reported a possible challenge to Griffin's leadership from a faction within the BNP, linked to Chris Jackson, which was dissatisfied with his performance, but rated this chance of success as low.

The BNP also claimed that it had received thousands of pounds in donations, and that 3,000 people had expressed an interest on their website in joining the party once their recruitment freeze was lifted. This would have represented a membership increase of nearly 30%, according to the party website.

While campaigning on 28 October for the forthcoming Glasgow North East by-election on 22 November, Griffin was asked why he had laughed on Question Time. He replied: "I had thought that David Dimbleby would have the professional self-respect to at least make a show of being fair. I was laughing at the fact that I was wrong", adding, "All that was exposed was the pure, vicious bigotry of the British ruling elite."

=== Other reactions and analyses ===
The programme was headline news in several of the early Friday paper editions of the British press, from the tabloids to the broadsheets. Tabloid headlines included "Bigot at Bay" (Daily Mail) and "When Auntie Met Nazi" (The Sun: "Auntie" being a nickname for the BBC), while broadsheets featured examples such as "Hostile reception for Griffin" (The Times) and "Griffin's baptism of fire at the BBC" (The Independent).

Immediately after the show, The Independent said Griffin had "choked" on the oxygen of publicity given him by the BBC. The Times described Griffin as having been "caught in TV's glare", subjected to a "hostile hour-long grilling". The Guardian, however, was of the opinion that, while Griffin was jeered and attacked and "often looked just plain shifty", he made no major gaffes and would thus think of it as a success. After rating the panel's performance as "flawed", and after some questions on the night went unanswered or were avoided by Griffin, it concluded that it "was the audience that came out best from the evening". The fact that four out of the five question topics on the night were BNP-related was criticised by some who believed it would allow Griffin to claim 'victimisation'. However, according to The Times, the BBC was 'delighted' with the strategy, which was to ensure it could not be accused of giving Griffin an "easy ride".

The Welsh Secretary, Peter Hain, who had appealed to the BBC Trust to have Griffin's appearance prevented, continued to denounce the decision. David Lammy, one of Britain's first black ministers, feared that people would face violence as a result of the programme. The former Home Secretary, David Blunkett, attacked the way in which BBC News at Six engaged in "deliberate promotion of their own publicity-seeking decision", opining that "the only people who have benefited from this row are the BNP and the BBC's Question Time ratings". The Conservative Mayor of London, Boris Johnson, responded to Griffin's complaints about the location by defending London's diversity, urging residents to "reject their narrow, extremist and offensive views at every opportunity". Anshel Pfeffer, commenting for the Israeli newspaper Haaretz, noted the relative silence of UK Jewish groups over the BNP appearance, and praised the BBC's decision to give the BNP a voice, stating: "The BBC is right to have Griffin and other racists on its most respectable shows; it is wrong to apologise. By doing so it is simply fulfilling its democratic and journalistic duties." Pfeffer compared and contrasted this with Israeli freedom-of-speech laws, and questioned whether Hitler could have risen to power in modern times given the media's scrutiny of democratic politicians.

The Guardian selected a spontaneous joke about the South Pole made by an audience member, Khush Klare, as the "undoubted highlight", having raised the loudest cheer from the audience. Klare, the son of Indian parents who migrated to Britain in the 1960s, had suggested collecting money for Griffin to be deported to the South Pole, as "it's a colourless landscape that will suit you fine". Klare said that while he did not think so at first, in retrospect he thought that Question Time was the right platform for Griffin.

Analysing the broadcast footage, The Times determined that the cameras spent "nearly 25 minutes" of the hour-long programme of the screen time either on Griffin or a "two-shot" with him and another panellist, equating to 38%. The Daily Mail alleged that the BBC "stage-managed" the programme, highlighting a crib-sheet handed out to the audience members; The Guardian's 'Media Monkey' blog observed that such a sheet is routinely given to the audience, and also accused The Mail of using a 'doctored' crib-sheet.

The first opinion poll taken following Nick Griffin's appearance, conducted hours after the programme by YouGov for The Daily Telegraph, indicated that voter support for the BNP had increased by 1%, from 2% to 3%, in the previous month, and that 22% of voters were now "seriously considering" voting BNP in a future local, general or European election — broken down into "definitely", 4%; "probably", 3%; and "possible", 15%. The bookmaker, William Hill, changed its odds on the BNP winning a Westminster seat in the 2010 General Election from 10–1 to 7–2 after the programme. The BNP received 1.9% of the vote in the election and did not win a seat.

In an interview in the News of the World, the former Archbishop of Canterbury, George Carey, spoke out against Griffin's claims that he was representing "Christian Britain" and called on Christians to "stand shoulder to shoulder" in rejecting the British National Party. The Prime Minister, Gordon Brown, did not watch the programme: his office explained that he "very rarely watches Question Time" through lack of time.

The programme received attention from English-speaking press around the world, including from North America, Asia, the Middle East, Australia, Turkey, and South America.

The media later reported that the cost of policing the appearance had been £143,000.

=== BBC view ===
The BBC was subjected to criticism from some of its own staff, as Radio 4 broadcaster Sue MacGregor said that the show "gave the impression of attack dogs against Nick Griffin", and another presenter called it a "bear pit". In defence of criticism of the format and focus of the programme, the Deputy Director General Mark Byford stated that "the agenda of the programme was set by the audience's own questions". Byford also said of the comments that "clearly Mr Griffin and the BNP were the subject of intense questioning, but all the panellists were given the opportunity to respond and to have their voices heard". Sir Christopher Bland, the former chairman of the BBC's board of governors, said, however, that had the BBC not changed the format, the corporation would probably have been accused of leniency.

On 23 October, the BBC said it was "too early" to confirm how much more airtime would be given to the BNP in the future; The Times reported on 24 October that the BBC had "no plans" to have Griffin on Question Time before the next general election.

On 28 October, Mark Thompson stated before the House of Lords communications committee that future BNP appearances on Question Time would "probably be no more than once a year and could be less", based on the party continuing the same levels of support. Thompson denied suggestions that the invitation was made to boost viewing figures.

No BNP representative has appeared on the show since the 22 October 2009 broadcast.

== See also ==
- BBC controversies
- Criticism of the BBC
- Far-right politics in the United Kingdom
- Immigration to the United Kingdom since 1922
- List of political parties in the United Kingdom
- List of Question Time episodes
- Politics of the United Kingdom
- Public service broadcasting in the United Kingdom
- Racism in the United Kingdom
