= Nigel Harris (economist) =

British economist

- Born: 1935 (age 90–91)

Academic background
- Education: University of Oxford; London School of Economics

Academic work
- Discipline: Development economics Urban development Migration
- Institutions: University College London

Nigel Harris (born 1935) is a British economist specializing in the economics of metropolitan areas. He is Professor Emeritus of the Economics of the City at University College London where in the 1980s he was Director for eight years of the Development Planning Unit at The Bartlett Faculty of the Built Environment. He is also a senior policy consultant to the think tank, the European Policy Centre, in Brussels, on the subject of international migration.

He earned his B.A. and M.A., both in philosophy, politics and economics at Magdalen College, Oxford in 1959 and 1962 respectively, and his Ph.D. (thesis: The Economic and Industrial Policy of the British Conservative Party, 1945–1964), in 1963, at the London School of Economics.

Harris was, for a time, a leading member of the British Socialist Workers Party and edited their publication International Socialism.

In recent years he has done a considerable amount of work for the World Bank. Harris' greatest public prominence in the UK has been though his advocacy and defence of immigration in such works as Thinking the Unthinkable: The Immigration Myth Exposed (2001) and he is currently a member of the RSA's Migration Commission.

== From state capitalism to the national capital project ==
Early on Harris sought to develop the idea of state capitalism—namely that, both East and West, direct state control and support of the economy flowed logically from the nature of capital itself. His book Ideas in Society, while a wider account of ideology, looked at the ways that, at the level of ideas, these tendencies were expressed. His book on the attitudes of the British Conservative party to state intervention showed how, after World War 2, a positive attitude towards the state developed even within an ostensibly anti-statist party. His work on India and China explored this issue in poor countries. Most important here was his book on China, The Mandate of Heaven, which developed a full bloodied state capitalist analysis of that country.

However, in his later work, he changed his views and argued that capitalism and the state were forces in opposition to one another. Their merger reflected the power of the political to override the economic in what he now called the national capital project. National capital projects remain immensely attractive within countries, but run counter to the essence of capitalism—which in economic terms is both market-oriented and anti-national, with a normal condition of loyalty exclusively to making a profit.

== The end of the third world and the national liberation argument ==
In the 1980s Harris was one of the first people to try to analyse the global shift in production towards parts of the global south. He argued that this shift was undermining the idea of a unified and impoverished 'third world'. In political terms it had also undermined the 'national liberation' model that had dominated the anti-colonial struggles and the arguments in the immediate post independence decades. But over time he was also led to question aspects of his earlier analysis as well as that of a wider Marxism.

== Capitalism, globalisation, the state and war ==
Harris increasingly took the view that capitalism, seen as an economic system, and left to its own devices, would necessarily be cosmopolitan and globalising. However, in previous centuries these tendencies had been overwhelmed, and to an extent captured, by the state system, nationalism and political drives to war. Although these non economic pressures had also stimulated the growth of capitalism it was possible to detach them analytically and politically. Indeed, this was what essentially has beginning to happen towards the end of the twentieth century. He called this in a 2003 work 'the return of cosmopolitan capital'. His book of the same name charted historically how capitalism had merged with the state system and was now beginning to demerge. However he fully recognised what he called 'the inertia' of the national state, not only as a political-economic force, but also as an ideological one, which also succeeded because it continued to force us to analyse a global world in national terms.

Harris's arguments made him appear as a strong globaliser in theoretical terms. But the fact that his analysis had emerged from a self critique from within the Marxist tradition meant that he was not taken up by mainstream globalisers despite the breadth and depth of his arguments. Equally the fact that he now disputed the link between political and economic forms under capitalism meant that he was also something of an outcast amongst those whose views he had earlier shared. But he did have an important supporter in David Lockwood who both wrote with him and has authored separate studies of Russia and India that reflected his influence.

== Support for migration and opposition to immigration controls ==
Harris's arguments for immigration have also to be understood in this wider context. His pro-immigration arguments operate at two levels. The first is a focus on the economic calculus where he argues that immigration benefits not only migrants but the leaving and destination societies. The most dynamic societies and the most dynamic cities are those that most engage with migration. Governments that try to restrict it therefore reduce the welfare of all as well, and engage in policies that are dangerous politically. Behind these arguments, however, lie deeper ones about both the right of humans to inherit the earth as a whole and the more specific ways that a global capitalism tends to create not simply a global capitalist class, but a global working class based on the new world workers. The latter can be unified to fight for their own interest and overcome national divisions, much in the way that Marx had hoped in the Communist Manifesto they would, but which a working class movement has not, so far, achieved because of national divisions.

== Selected publications ==
- Beliefs in Society: The Problem of Ideology (1971)
- World Crisis: Essays in Revolutionary Socialism (co-edited with John Palmer) (1971)
- Competition and the Corporate Society: British Conservatives, the State and Industry, 1945–64 (1972)
- India–China: Underdevelopment and Revolution (1974)
- The Mandate of Heaven: Marx and Mao in Modern China (1978)
- Economic Development, Cities and Planning: The Case of Bombay (1978)
- Why Import Controls Won't Save jobs: The Socialist Case (with Duncan Hallas) (1981)
- Of Bread and Guns: The World Economy in Crisis (1983)
- The End of the Third World: Newly Industrialising Countries and the Decline of an Ideology (1987)
- Why Half the World Goes Hungry (1987)
- National Liberation (1990)
- City, Class and Trade: Social and Economic Change in the Third World (1991)
- Cities in the 1990s: The Challenge for Developing Countries (editor) (1992)
- The New Untouchables: Immigration and the New World Worker(1996)
- Cities and Structural Adjustment (co-edited with Ida Fabricius) (1996)
- Jobs for the Poor: A Case Study in Cuttack (1996)
- Thinking the Unthinkable: The Immigration Myth Exposed (2002)
- The Return of Cosmopolitan Capital: Globalisation, the State and War (2003)
- The Terrorist (2007)
