= Talha Ahmad =

British barrister and human rights activist

Talha Ahmad is a British barrister and London based rights activist. He was the Treasurer of Muslim Council of Britain from 2016 to 2018 and is the co-chair of Stand Up to Racism.

== Professional Life ==
Ahmad became a barrister from Lincoln's Inn in 2010, and is a solicitor and advocate of the higher courts in England and Wales, specialising in civil and commercial litigation, charity, property and family law. He has been a director and solicitor-advocate (civil and criminal) of LeasideLaw Solicitors since 2018.

== Political activism ==
=== Muslim Council of Britain ===
As part of the national council, and later, the executive committee of the Muslim Council of Britain (MCB), Ahmad worked in various capacities, among them the chair as the membership committee from 2010 to 2014, and its treasurer from 2016 to 2018. He was one of the candidates for the position of the office of deputy secretary general of the MCB for 2018–2020.

=== Other organisations ===
Ahmad is the co-chair of Stand Up to Racism.

He was a council member of Citizens UK and chair of Home Start Tower Hamlets.

He is also active in administrative bodies of several Muslim community institutions such as Bordesley Green Islamic Centre and Darul Ummah Redbridge.

== Activism ==
As a spokesperson for the MCB, Ahmad made many media appearances on issues such as the refugee crisis, racism in the UK, the "Trojan Horse" affair and broader Muslim politics in the region. His notable appearances on TV include the BBC Newsnight programme, BBC Sunday Politics, BBC Daily Politics, BBC Radio 4 Today, ITV Good Morning Britain, Channel 4 News, Aljazeera, CNN and SKY News.

Ahmad has spoken and written on the war-crimes trials in Bangladesh on Aljazeera and the Turkish state broadcaster TRT World, raising questions on the fairness of the trials and identifying them as political persecution of the opposition.

He is also the host of the talk show The Conversation on TV One UK, an English and Bangla TV channel directed at Muslim audiences in the UK and Europe.
