= Chris Harman =

British journalist and political activist (1942–2009)

- Born: 8 November 1942
- Died: 7 November 2009 (aged 66); Cairo, Egypt

Philosophical work
- Era: Contemporary philosophy
- Region: Western philosophy
- School: Marxism; Revolutionary socialism; Trotskyism
- Main interests: Politics; Economics; Philosophy; Sociology

Christopher John Harman (8 November 1942 – 7 November 2009) was a British journalist and political activist, and a member of the Central Committee of the Socialist Workers Party. He was an editor of International Socialism and Socialist Worker.

== Life ==
Harman was born into a working-class family and attended Leeds University (where he joined the Socialist Review Group in 1961) and the London School of Economics (LSE) where he began (but did not complete) a doctorate under the supervision of Ralph Miliband. He was instrumental in publishing the magazine of the LSE Socialist Society, The Agitator, and was a leading member of the International Socialists (as the SRG had become) by 1968. He was involved in the Vietnam Solidarity Campaign and outraged many leftists when, at a meeting in the Conway Hall, he denounced Ho Chi Minh for murdering the leader of the Vietnamese Trotskyist movement, Tạ Thu Thâu, in 1945 after crushing the workers' rising of that year in Saigon.

His main role in the IS (from 1977 the Socialist Workers Party, or SWP) was as a theorist and he produced numerous books and articles on a wide variety of topics. Almost all his writing appeared in the publications of the IS and SWP or has been published by related publishing houses, such as Bookmarks. He was first editor of Socialist Worker in 1976-77 and returned to the role after a break in 1982, remaining in the post until 2004, when he started editing the SWP's theoretical quarterly International Socialism Journal.

Harman's work on the May 1968 events in France and other student and workers' uprisings of the late 1960s, The Fire Last Time, was recommended by rock band Rage Against the Machine in the album liner notes for Evil Empire.

Harman died on 7 November 2009, following a cardiac arrest while lecturing at the Socialist Days conference of the Center for Socialist Studies (CSS) in Cairo, Egypt. He is buried in Highgate Cemetery, London, a few yards from Karl Marx's tomb and adjacent to his comrade Paul Foot.

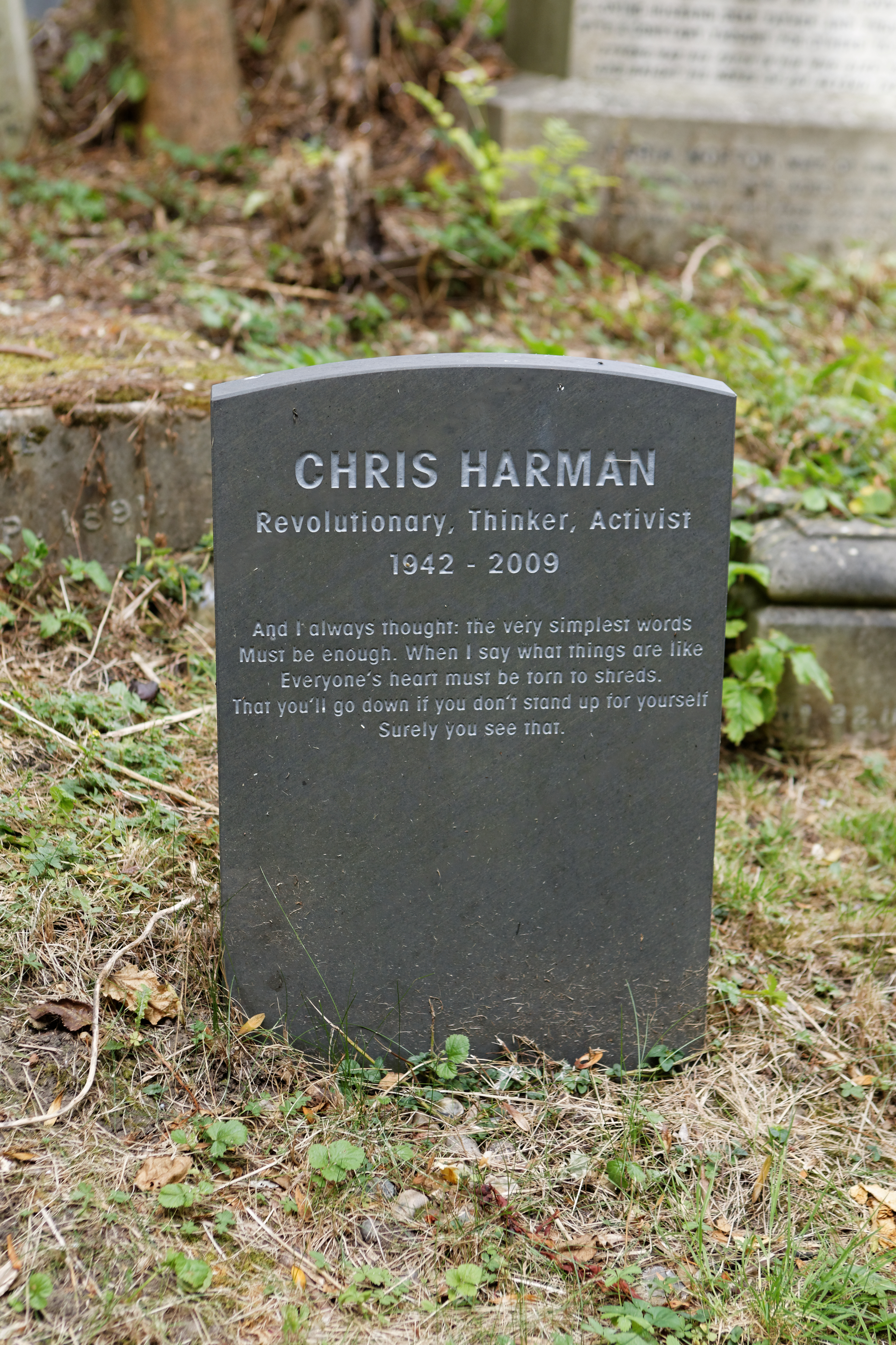
Harman's grave in Highgate Cemetery

== Selected works ==
=== Books and pamphlets ===
- Education, capitalism and the student revolt (1968)
- Russia: How the Revolution Was Lost (1967)
- Unemployment and how to fight it (with Dave Peers) (1971)
- The struggle in Ireland (1975)
- Why Labour fails (1979)
- New technology and the struggle for socialism (1979)
- The summer of 1981: a post-riot analysis (1981)
- Days of Hope: The General Strike of 1926 (with Duncan Hallas) (1981)
- Gramsci versus Reformism (1983)
- The Revolutionary Press (Summer, 1984)
- Explaining The Crisis: A Marxist Reappraisal (London, 1984) ISBN 0-906224-11-X
- The Changing Working Class: Essays on Class Structure Today (with Alex Callinicos) (London: Bookmarks, 1987) ISBN 0-906224-40-3
- Russia: from workers' state to state capitalism (with Peter Binns and Tony Cliff) (London, 1987)
- Class Struggles in Eastern Europe, 1945-1983 (London, 1988) ISBN 0-906224-47-0
- The Fire Last Time: 1968 And After (London, 1988) ISBN 1-898876-35-5
- The revolutionary paper (1991)
- In The Heat of the Struggle: 25 Years of Socialist Worker (editor) (with an introduction by Paul Foot) (1993) ISBN 0-906224-94-2
- Economics of the Madhouse: Capitalism and the Market Today (London, 1995) ISBN 1-898876-03-7
- How Marxism Works (London, 1997) ISBN 1-898876-27-4
- The Lost Revolution: Germany 1918-23 (London, 1997) ISBN 1-898876-22-3
- Marxism and History: Two Essays (London, 1998) ISBN 1-898876-31-2
- A People's History of the World (1999)
- The Prophet And The Proletariat: Islamic fundamentalism, class and revolution (London, 1999) ISBN 1-898877-18-1
- The IMF, Globalisation and Resistance (2000)
- Revolution in the 21st Century (2007)
- Capitalism's New Crisis: What do socialists say? (2008)
- Zombie Capitalism: Global Crisis and the Relevance of Marx (London, 2009) ISBN 978-1-905192-53-3
- Selected Writings (2011)

=== Articles ===
- "Party and Class"
- "Gramsci Versus Reformism"
- "The 'workers's' government" (with Tim Potter)
- "The State and Capitalism Today"
- "The Summer of 1981 – a post-riot analysis"
- "Women's Liberation and Revolutionary Socialism"
- "Base and Superstructure"
- "From Feudalism to Capitalism"
- "The Myth of Market Socialism"
- "Engels and the origins of human society"
- "The Prophet and the Proletariat"
- "Analysing Imperialism"
- "The workers of the world"
- "Anti-capitalism: Theory and Practice"
- "Spontaneity, strategy and politics"
- "Gramsci, the Prison Notebooks and philosophy"
- Trotsky and the New Stalinism

Media offices
Preceded by Paul Foot	Editor of Socialist Worker; 1978–2004	Succeeded by Chris Bambery
