= Substitutionism =

Term in Marxist theory

Substitutionism is a term in Marxist theory which refers to the relationship between the revolutionary party and the working class, in which the party acts on behalf of the working class rather than through its direct participation. The concept is used by Marxist critics to describe a departure from the Marxist principle that the emancipation of the working class must be carried out by itself. The term was coined by Leon Trotsky in 1904 as a critique of Vladimir Lenin’s conception of the party, arguing that it risked sidelining the working class in favor of party leadership.

== See also ==
- Castroism
- Maoism
- Permanent revolution
- Stalinism
- State capitalism
- Two Stage Theory
- Vanguardism
