= Workers League (UK) =

The Workers League was a small Trotskyist group in the United Kingdom that operated during the 1970s.

It began as the IS Opposition, formed in 1975 within the International Socialists (now the Socialist Workers Party), and containing many prominent IS members. These included Roger Protz, Jim Higgins and Harry Wicks. They had several major disagreements with the IS leadership, including what they perceived as an increasingly ultra left stance, refusing to work with other socialist groups, and a reduction in internal democracy.

In December 1975 after campaigning for a Special Conference of IS, the faction's leaders were expelled. Following this a considerable number of IS members left the group including the influential engineering fraction in Birmingham.

About 150 former IS members, but crucially not all the ISO's leaders including Roger Protz and John Palmer, then regrouped around Jim Higgins to form the Workers' League. They based themselves on what they described as the IS tradition with an orientation on rank and file work in the workplaces and unions, which they alleged IS had abandoned. They published a newspaper, Workers News, but membership swiftly eroded. For example, a fraction based in West London declared itself for Labour Party entry, and when their argument was rejected, decamped to that party.

In 1978, Higgins and some other leading cadre withdrew, and the party changed its publication into a magazine called Socialist Voice, which featured analysis of energy policy and sexual politics. The group joined the International Marxist Group's (IMG) International Socialist Alliance, and took part in its Socialist Unity campaign. The group seems to have dissolved itself soon after. Socialist Organiser later noted that some members of the group ended up joining the Socialist Society.
