= Alex Callinicos =

British political theorist (born 1950)

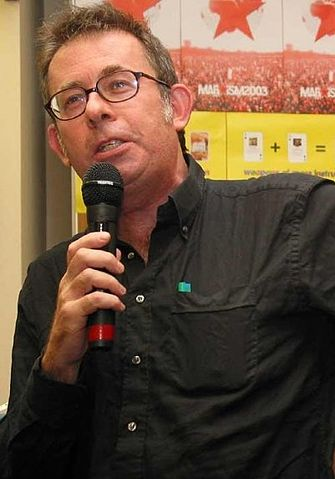
- Alex Callinicos in 2009
- Born: Alexander Theodore Callinicos; 24 July 1950 (age 76); Salisbury, Southern Rhodesia
- Political party: SWP
- Relatives: John Dalberg-Acton, 1st Baron Acton (great-grandfather)

Education
- Academic advisor: Imre Lakatos

Philosophical work
- Era: Contemporary philosophy
- Region: Western philosophy
- School: Marxism
- Institutions: University of York; King's College London
- Main interests: Political theory; Political economy; Social theory
- Notable ideas: Marxist anti-imperialist theory of the interaction between capitalist accumulation and interstate power politics

Alexander Theodore Callinicos (born 24 July 1950) is a British Marxist political theorist and activist, born in Salisbury, Southern Rhodesia. An adherent of Trotskyism, he has been a member of the Central Committee of the Socialist Workers Party (SWP) and has served as its International Secretary. Between 2009 and 2020 he was the editor of International Socialism, the SWP's theoretical journal, and has published a number of books.

== Biography ==
=== Early life ===
He became involved in revolutionary politics as a student at Balliol College, Oxford, where he studied for a BA and came to know Christopher Hitchens, then himself active in the International Socialists (the SWP's forerunner). He also received his DPhil at Oxford. The earliest writing by Callinicos for the International Socialists was an analysis of the student movement of the period. His other early writings focused on southern Africa and the French structuralist-Marxist philosopher Louis Althusser. In 1977, Callinicos married Joanna Seddon, a fellow Oxford doctoral student.

=== Career and activism ===
Callinicos participated in the Counter-Summit to the IMF/World Bank Meeting in Prague, September 2000 and the demonstration against the G8 in Genoa, June 2001. He has also been involved in organising the Social Forum movement in Europe. He was a contributor to Dictionnaire Marx Contemporain (2001), and has written articles in New Left Review.

He was Professor of Politics at the University of York before being appointed Professor of European Studies at King's College London in September 2005. He succeeded Chris Harman as editor of International Socialism in January 2010 shortly after Harman died and is a British correspondent for Actuel Marx. Callinicos joined the central committee of the SWP in the late 1970s; he retained this position until December 2025.

Callinicos was a critic of the humanitarian interventions in Bosnia and Kosovo, arguing that they were conducted solely to promote the global capitalist expansion. He has described Russia's invasion of Ukraine as "an ongoing battle between imperialist rivals, driving forward by capitalist competition". He has argued against Western efforts to provide arms for Ukraine.

In January 2013, in the context of a serious crisis inside the UK Socialist Workers Party (SWP) associated with the party's response to an allegation of rape against a leading member of the party, Martin Smith, referred to internally as Comrade Delta, and with the demand for changes to the existing form of the system of democratic centralism within the SWP, he wrote a defence of Leninism and democratic centralism. Callinicos disagreed with those who argued for the need to change the existing system. He called the allegation of rape a "difficult disciplinary case", a comment for which socialist feminist Laurie Penny thought he "[mistook] a plea for some basic respect for women's sexual autonomy as an attempt to undermine the revolution from within."

Callinicos took a prominent position on another issue which had divided the Socialist Workers Party (SWP): the use of the Internet in disagreements about confidential party issues. He complained about "the dark side of the Internet" in which individuals have "used blogs and social media to launch a campaign within the SWP".

In order to disentangle a conference organised by the Historical Materialism journal in Delhi during 2013 from the SWP crisis, his invitation to the conference was withdrawn in March 2013.

== Works ==
=== Books/pamphlets ===
- 1976: Althusser's Marxism (London: Pluto Press) ISBN 0-904383-02-4
- 1977: Southern Africa after Soweto (with John Rogers) (London: Pluto Press), ISBN 0-904383-42-3
- 1981: Southern Africa after Zimbabwe (London: Pluto) ISBN 0-86104-336-7
- 1982: Is there a future for Marxism? (London: Macmillan). ISBN 0-333-28477-1
- 1983: Marxism and Philosophy (Oxford: Clarendon). ISBN 0-19-876126-0
- 1983: The revolutionary ideas of Karl Marx (London: Bookmarks). ISBN 0-906224-09-8
- 1983: The Revolutionary Road to Socialism (London: Socialist Workers Party). ISBN 0-905998-53-7
- 1985: South Africa: the Road to Revolution (Toronto: International Socialists). ISBN 0-905998-55-3
- 1985: The Great Strike : the miners’ strike of 1984-5 and its lessons (with Mike Simons) (London: Socialist Worker) ISBN 0-905998-50-2
- 1987: The Changing Working Class: Essays on Class Structure Today (with Chris Harman) (London: Bookmarks) ISBN 0-906224-40-3
- 1988: South Africa Between Reform and Revolution (London: Bookmarks). ISBN 0-906224-46-2
- 1988: Making History: Agency, Structure, and Change in Social Theory (Ithaca, N.Y.: Cornell University Press). ISBN 0-8014-2121-7
- 1989: Marxist Theory (editor) (Oxford: Oxford University Press). ISBN 0-19-827294-4
- 1990: Trotskyism (Minneapolis: University of Minnesota Press). ISBN 0-8166-1904-2
- 1991: The Revenge of History: Marxism and the East European Revolutions ISBN 0-271-00767-2
- 1991: Against Postmodernism: a Marxist critique (Cambridge: Polity Press). ISBN 0-312-04224-8
- 1992: Between Apartheid and Capitalism: conversations with South African socialists (editor) (London: Bookmarks). ISBN 0-906224-68-3
- 1994: Marxism and the New Imperialism (London; Chicago, Ill. : Bookmarks). ISBN 0-906224-81-0
- 1995: Theories and Narratives (Cambridge: Polity Press). ISBN 0-7456-1201-6
- 1995: Race and Class (London: Bookmark Publications). ISBN 0-906224-83-7
- 1995: Socialists in the trade unions (London: Bookmarks) ISBN 1-898876-01-0
- 1996: New Labour or socialism? (London: Bookmarks) ISBN 1898877076
- 1999: Social Theory: Historical Introduction (New York: New York University Press). ISBN 0-8147-1593-1
- 2000: Equality (Themes for the 21st Century) (Cambridge: Polity Press). ISBN 0-7456-2324-7
- 2002: Against the Third Way (Cambridge: Polity Press). ISBN 0-7456-2674-2
- 2003: An anti-Capitalist manifesto (Cambridge: Polity Press). ISBN 0-7456-2903-2
- 2003: New Mandarins of American Power: the Bush administration’s plans for the world (Cambridge: Polity Press). ISBN 0-7456-3274-2
- 2006: Universities in a Neoliberal World (London: Bookmarks) ISBN 1898877467
- 2006: The Resources of Critique (Cambridge: Polity). ISBN 0-7456-3160-6
- 2009: Imperialism and Global Political Economy (Cambridge, Polity). ISBN 0-7456-4045-1
- 2010: Bonfire of Illusions: The Twin Crises of the Liberal World (Polity). ISBN 0-7456-4876-2
- 2012: The Revolutionary Ideas of Karl Marx (Haymarket) ISBN 978-1-6084-6138-7
- 2014: Deciphering Capital: Marx's Capital and its destiny (London: Bookmarks).
- 2023: The New Age of Catastrophe (London: Polity).

=== Articles ===
- "Trotsky’s Theory of Permanent Revolution" (1982)
- "The 'New Middle Class' and socialists" (1983)
- "Bourgeois Revolutions and Historical Materialism" (1989)
- "Marxism and Imperialism Today" (1991)
- "Race and Class" (1992)
- "Wonders Taken for Signs: Homi Bhabha's Postcolonialism". In Post-Ality: Marxism and Postmodernism. Edited by Mas'ud Zavarzadeh, Teresa Ebert, and Donald Morton. Washington, DC: Maisonneuve Press (1995).
- "The Anti-Capitalist Movement And The Revolutionary Left" (2001)
- "Plumbing the depths: Marxism and the Holocaust" (2001)
- "The grand strategy of the American Empire" (2002)
- "Imperialism and Global Political Economy", International Socialism, 108, Autumn 2005.
- "Interview with Alex Callinicos: The Imperial Assault on the Middle East" (2006)
- "Does capitalism need the state system?", Cambridge Review of International Affairs, 20(4), (2007) pp. 533–549.
- "Where is the radical left going?", International Socialism, 120, Autumn 2008.
- "The Limits of Passive Revolution" Capital & Class, vol 34, no. 3, pp. 491–507. (2010).
- "The internationalist case against the European Union", International Socialism, 148 (2015).
- Brexit: a world-historic turn, International Socialism, 151 (2016).
- The orphaned revolution: The meaning of October 1917, International Socialism, 156 (2017).
- Chris Harman and the critique of political economy, International Socialism, 165 (2020).
- Marx and Spinoza, International Socialism, 180 (2023).
