= Jim Higgins (British politician) =

British revolutionary socialist and leading member of the International Socialists

- Born: 2 December 1930; Harrow, London
- Died: 13 October 2002 (aged 71)
- Occupations: Telecommunications engineer; Journalist
- Employer: General Post Office
- Organizations: Young Communist League; International Socialists; Workers League; Post Office Engineering Union
- Known for: Activism
- Notable work: More Years for the Locust

Jim Higgins (2 December 1930 – 13 October 2002) was a British revolutionary socialist and a leading member of the International Socialists.

== Biography ==
Born into a working-class family in Harrow, London, Higgins joined the Young Communist League at 14. At the age of eighteen, he was apprenticed to the Post Office as a telecommunications engineer.

After National Service in the early 1950s, he became active in both the Communist Party of Great Britain and the Post Office Engineering Union (POEU). He left the Communist Party after Nikita Khrushchev's 1956 secret speech and the Soviet invasion of Hungary. Higgins instead joined the Trotskyist Socialist Labour League, soon leaving to join the Socialist Review Group which became the International Socialists (IS), and becoming the group's Secretary.

By the 1960s, Higgins was a POEU branch secretary and was elected to the union's national executive, but he gave up his union work to become IS's full-time national secretary in the early 1970s. In a burst of internal quarrels in the period 1973-76 he left the organisation. He was a founder member of the Workers League, but this organisation soon broke apart. Instead, he built a new life as a journalist, later transitioning into magazine design. He remained active as a writer and speaker at left-wing meetings until his death. In 1997, he published a memoir, More Years for the Locust.

Papers left by Higgins and Al Richardson have been deposited with Senate House Library, University of London.

== Selected publications ==
- Lenin (Socialist Worker pamphlet) April 1970
- More Years for the Locust, IS Group, London, 1997
