= Socialist Workers Party (UK) =

Trotskyist political party in the United Kingdom

- Abbreviation: SWP
- International secretary: Alex Callinicos
- National secretary: Lewis Nielsen
- Founder: Tony Cliff
- Founded: Socialist Review Group (1950); International Socialists (1962); Socialist Workers Party (1977)
- Split from: The Club
- Headquarters: London, England, United Kingdom
- Newspaper: Socialist Worker; International Socialism
- Membership (2023): ▲2,504 (financial); 6,000 (registered)
- Ideology: Trotskyism; Anti-Stalinism; Revolutionary socialism
- International affiliation: International Socialist Tendency
- Colours: Red
- Governing bodies: Central committee; national committee

Website
- socialistworker.co.uk

The Socialist Workers Party (SWP) is a Trotskyist political party in the United Kingdom. Founded as the Socialist Review Group (SRG) by supporters of Tony Cliff in 1950 which had split from The Club, it became the International Socialists in 1962 and the SWP in 1977. Cliff and his followers criticised the Soviet Union and its satellites, calling them state capitalist rather than truly socialist countries.

The SWP has founded several fronts through which they have sought to coordinate and influence leftist action, such as the Anti-Nazi League in the late 1970s. It also formed an alliance with George Galloway and Respect, the dissolution of which in 2007 caused an internal crisis in the SWP. A more serious internal crisis emerged at the beginning of 2013 over allegations of rape and sexual assault made against a leading member of the party. The SWP's handling of these accusations against the individual known as "Comrade Delta", later identified as Martin Smith, led to a significant decline in the party's membership. It also led to a number of formal reviews which resulted in new procedures to support any member who experienced sexual harassment or other forms of oppressive behaviour.

On the international level, the SWP is part of the International Socialist Tendency.

== History ==
=== Socialist Review Group (1950–1962) ===
The SWP's origins lie in the formation of the Socialist Review Group (SRG), which had split from The Club (a precursor to the Workers Revolutionary Party). The group was formed in 1950, and held its founding conference in 1951. The group, initially made up of only eight members, was formed around Tony Cliff's analysis of Russia as a bureaucratic state capitalist regime rather than a truly Marxist one. Three documents formed the group's theoretical basis: The Nature of Stalinist Russia, The Class Nature of the People's Democracies and Marxism and the Theory of Bureaucratic Collectivism. The group at this time was associated with Third Camp Marxism.

The group's size meant that they adopted entryism as a means of working in the Labour Party in order to reach an audience and recruit. Of particular importance was the Labour League of Youth (LLY); from the 33 members at the first recorded meeting, 19 were in the LLY. This entryism eventually led to the creation of Labour's Militant tendency in the 1980s.

By campaigning within the Campaign for Nuclear Disarmament and the Young Socialists, a new Labour Party youth movement, the Socialist Review Group recruited from a new generation of activists and by 1964 had a membership of 200. In 1959, the first edition of Cliff's book on Rosa Luxemburg was published. In it, Cliff writes:

Rosa Luxemburg's conception of the structure of the revolutionary organisation – that they should be built from below up, on a consistently democratic basis – fits the needs of the workers' movement in the advanced countries much more closely than Lenin's conception of 1902−4, which was copied and given an added bureaucratic twist by Stalinists the world over.

Cliff wrote in 1960 that Leon Trotsky's insight in 1904 about Vladimir Lenin's substitutionism was a strong warning of the serious flaws "inherent in Lenin's conception of party organisation" sustained by events since 1917.

=== International Socialists (1962–1977) ===
The paper Industrial Worker was created in 1961 and was quickly renamed Labour Worker before evolving into Socialist Worker. Socialist Review was reduced in size and then scrapped. The Socialist Review Group became the International Socialism Group (IS) in December 1962.

With the Labour Party in power and many Labour members becoming disillusioned, IS started doing more work that was external to the Labour Party and ceased to practise entryism as a tactic around 1965. After 1967, few IS members were active in that party. In 1965, an article in Labour Worker said: "Obviously Marxists should take those positions which give access to the direct workers' organisations. But in the wards and GMCs the practice of buying the right to discuss politics by over-fulfilling the canvassing norms, should cease or be reduced to the minimum".

It marked a turn to more of a focus on work in the trade unions, and a key part of this process was the pamphlet published in 1966: Incomes policy, legislation and shop stewards, which opposed the Labour Party's incomes policy and discussed how it could be fought.

In 1968, the group adopted Leninist democratic centralism as an organisational practice returning to Cliff's original position after leaving aside brief flirtations with Luxemburgian critiques of party vanguardism. This period saw the IS heavily involved in the Vietnam Solidarity Campaign (in support of the Viet Cong) and local variations of the student protests of 1968, where it was able to recruit from this pool of youngsters. As a result, the IS grew from 400 to 1,000 members but also suffered many splits. According to group historian Ian Birchall, "IS's position was always one of unconditional support for the IRA in the struggle against imperialism". However, Socialist Worker argued against those who prematurely raised the slogan "Troops Out!" on the grounds that the presence of British troops would allow the nationalist population to recover:

The breathing space provided by the presence of British troops is short but vital. Those who call for the immediate withdrawal of the troops before the men behind the barricades can defend themselves are inviting a pogrom which will hit first and hardest at socialists.

With hindsight, Tony Cliff concluded that the years 1970–74 had been "the best years of my life". That period saw the creation of rank-and-file newspapers and a general turn to industry, including setting up factory branches. During the 1972 miners' strike, Socialist Worker was taken and sold by miners. The membership of the IS increased from 1,000 in 1971, to 4,000 by 1977.

Meanwhile, other much smaller far-left groups emerged as a result of their members being expelled from the IS. The Workers Fight group joined as an open and allowed faction, but were expelled in 1971 over disagreements relating to the European Common Market. The Revolutionary Communist Group split in 1973 over the fact that the IS had no formal programme and its reliance on "Economism". The RCG itself had to deal with internal opposition that eventually became the Revolutionary Communist Party led by Frank Furedi. In 1975, what had been known as the Left Faction suffered the same fate, and became Workers Power. The group had split over the lack of a party programme and transitional demands.

In 1974, Labour returned to power and introduced the Social Contract which implemented a voluntary incomes policy, with the backing of many left wing union leaders such as Hugh Scanlon and Jack Jones. This period also saw an increase in the number of full-time union convenors, and these factors along with an increase in unemployment have been blamed by Tony Cliff and the SWP for a drastic fall in union militancy. In 1974 the IS was ambitious and optimistic expecting to double the number of its factory branches over the next year. In practice, they declined swiftly from 38 in 1974 to only three or four by 1976. When the firefighters went on strike in 1977 against the Social Contract the IS could deliver no significant solidarity. The national rank-and-file movement fell apart. In 1976, the SWP decided to stand in parliamentary by-elections but the results were very poor and the original idea of standing in 60 seats at the next election was dropped.

In 1976, the Workers League group split from the IS.

=== Formation of the SWP (1977–1990) ===
In January 1977 IS was renamed the Socialist Workers Party. This decision was a result of the move to stand in elections along with a perception that "IS's ability to initiate activity, rather than simply join in movements launched by others, had never been greater. Industrially, there were more members than ever able to lead disputes in their own workplaces". According to Martin Shaw, this occurred with no real discussion within the organisation. Jim Higgins has said: "Its founding was for purely internal reasons, to give the members a sense of progress, the better to conceal the fact that there had actually been a retreat".

==== Anti-Nazi League and Rock against Racism ====
A campaign in which the SWP had a significant role at this time was the Anti-Nazi League (ANL), and viewed as a "front" for the organisation by commentators and historians. The National Front (NF) grew during the 1970s and in the May 1976 local elections polled 15,340 votes in Leicester and large votes elsewhere. They were even more visible on the streets through graffiti, racist attacks and street protests. A key turning point came when on 13 August 1977 thousands of anti-fascists, later joined by large numbers of local black youths, attempted to stop the NF from marching through Lewisham.

The SWP launched the Anti Nazi League in 1977. The SWP's involvement was led by Paul Holborow with assistance from Jerry Fitzpatrick and Nigel Harris. Although it was portrayed as a broad initiative supported by the SWP along with wide swathes of the Labour Left and figures from popular culture (singers, musicians, actors and so on), many on the left saw the ANL as a self-serving unilateral SWP initiative to seize the leadership of the anti-racist movement and many anti-racist/anti-fascist activists regarded it with suspicion. This was particularly true of many in the existing broad-based Anti-Fascist Committees (often with close connections to the local labour and trade union movement). That local ANL groups were often launched as an SWP-led alternative to existing broad-based Anti-Fascist Committees increased non-SWP activists' suspicions, but a widespread desire not to display public divisions and fear of alienating the ANL's celebrity sponsors kept these divisions fairly quiet. The ANL also received support from other Trotskyist groups and the Communist Party of Great Britain, who restrained their members and supporters from openly criticising the ANL.

In response to Eric Clapton's public support for Enoch Powell, Rock Against Racism was set up in close collaboration with the ANL and a series of successful carnivals were organised. Among the bands involved with Rock Against Racism were The Clash (as seen in the film Rude Boy), The Buzzcocks, Steel Pulse, X-Ray Spex, The Ruts, Generation X and the Tom Robinson Band. By 1981, the NF had fragmented becoming far smaller, and the campaign was wound up.

==== Downturn ====
From 1978 onward, Tony Cliff became convinced by some of his comrades that the period of rising militancy had come to an end and a downturn had begun. Cliff wrote: "The crisis in the organisation went on for about 3 years, 1976–79". The period of 1966-1985 has been cited as "The Golden Age" for the Trotskyist movement in Britain, according to Historian John Kelly. This was in spite of the group having seven splits occur during the 1970s and 1980s.

By 1982, the SWP was refocused completely to a propagandist approach, with geographical branches as the main unit of the party, a focus on Marxist theory and an abandonment of perspective of building a rank and file movement. The rank and file organisations were wound down, as were the ANL, the women's organisation Women's Voice and the paper for ethnic minorities Flame. Many of those active in the ANL and especially its defence "squads" were denounced as "squadist" and expelled, later forming Anti-Fascist Action and Red Action.

The closure of Women's Voice in 1982, reputedly because it tried to inject feminist thinking into SWP theoretical practice rather than gaining women members for the party, was a bitterly disputed action made by the leadership, a sharp debate taking place between those who believed the result would be to ignore the specificities of women's oppression and those who believed feminist theories were in danger of losing contact with the united interests of men and women workers.

During the 1984–1985 miners' strike, the SWP's propaganda concentrated on the need for solidarity and explaining why this was not happening. Cliff described the approach as one of concrete propaganda: "It had to answer the question 'What slogan fits the issue the workers are fighting over?'".

This change in outlook and methods was viewed by many on the left as being a retreat into sectarianism by the SWP, but this change in methods is credited by the SWP as allowing it to survive a very hostile period with substantial numbers of party members. In contrast Murray Smith described it as "jumping from one campaign to the next and hostility towards the rest of the left".

=== 1990s ===
The early 1990s, for many of the far left, was a period of demoralisation and disorientation, due to the Soviet Union's collapse. But the SWP saw this as a vindication of their long-held analysis that the Soviet Union was a 'state capitalist' society. They argued that "the transition from state capitalism to multinational capitalism is neither a step forward nor a step backwards, but a step sidewards. The change only involves a shift from one form of exploitation to another form for the working class as a whole."

It was in this period that the Revolutionary Democratic Group were expelled and became, in their words, "an external faction". The SWP was involved in the relaunch of the ANL in 1992 in response to the growth of the British National Party and campaigned against the Criminal Justice Bill. A demonstration for justice for murdered teenager Stephen Lawrence near the BNP headquarters in Welling in 1993 turned into a violent confrontation with the police, leading to criticism from Ken Livingstone, then a Labour MP and a supporter of the rival Anti-Racist Alliance (ARA) in which Socialist Action played a major role. Livingstone argued that this kind of action was playing into the hands of the BNP. He said at the time: "No one's discussing [the BNP's] policies. Now the question is the violence of the SWP, arguments between the police and the SWP about who is to blame". Although Stephen's mother Doreen Lawrence attended the Welling demo, she came to realise that the ANL was a "front for the Socialist Workers Party". She later wrote, "the various groups that had taken an interest in Stephen's death were tearing each other apart and were in danger of destroying our campaign which we wanted to keep focused and dignified", and Doreen and Neville Lawrence wrote to both the ANL and ARA to demand that they "stop using Stephen's name".

In 1997, despite strongly opposing Tony Blair's policies, they called for a vote for the Labour Party with the belief that there would rapidly be a crisis of expectations in Labour, which would lead New Labour voters to question their allegiances, opening up opportunities, space for organisation and activity to the left of Labour traditionally occupied by the party when it is in opposition. John Rees wrote in July 1997: "In the mid-term the 'sado-monetarist' strategy followed by the Labour government will clash increasingly sharply with a working class movement which has drawn hope and confidence from its electoral victory over the Tories".

=== Government surveillance ===
The SWP's Head Office, Tony Cliff's, and Industrial Organizer John Deason's phones were wiretapped between 1951 and 1991. The British intelligence services also infiltrated the Anti-Nazi League in the 1970s, and the SWP itself in the 1980s. Around 25 agents/informers were active in the party during the 1970s and 1980s.

Between 1970 and 2007, 24 undercover Metropolitan Police officers infiltrated the SWP. Some used the identities of dead children and four had sexual relationships with party members.

=== Involvement with other groups ===
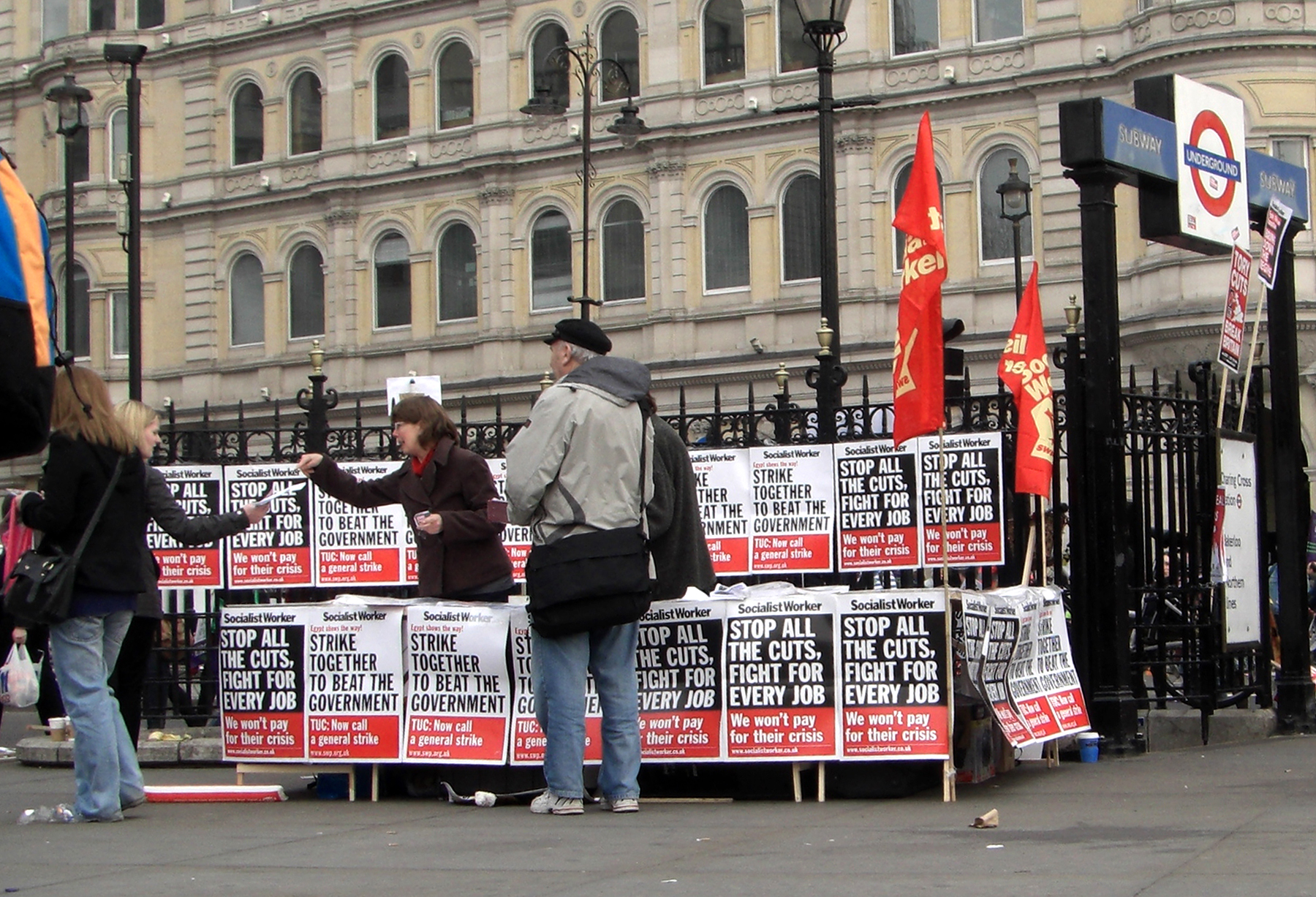
A stall run by the SWP in Trafalgar Square at the 2011 anti-cuts protest in London

The SWP was involved with the Socialist Alliance in England (alongside the Alliance for Workers' Liberty, the Socialist Party, Workers' Power, and Socialist Resistance). It was also involved with the Welsh Socialist Alliance. Its Scottish members joined the Scottish Socialist Party as the Socialist Worker Platform in May 2001. The SWP was accused of financial impropriety by Liz Davies and by a former SA press officer of "running" the Alliance into the ground.

In the aftermath of 9/11, the SWP joined numerous other groups to launch the Stop the War Coalition. The coalition's aims were to oppose the invasions of Afghanistan and Iraq and to campaign against attacks on Muslims. Lindsey German was elected as Convenor and John Rees and Chris Nineham were appointed as national officers, all leading SWP members at the time. The Coalition organised a demonstration on 15 February 2003 when around 750,000 people (according to the Police) or up to 2 million (according to the organisers) marched through London.

The SWP called the Iraqi insurgency a "resistance" movement against military occupation and endorsed George Galloway's support of Hezbollah, whom they called "the resistance". In addition, the Muslim Association of Britain was accused of being a conservative Islamist body sharing only anti-western sentiments with groups like the SWP and Respect. Former Socialist Alliance and Stop the War activist and press officer Anna Chen saw Lindsey German's comment "I'm in favour of defending gay rights, but I am not prepared to have it as a shibboleth, [created by] people who ... won't defend George Galloway", as the party's equivalent of Labour's revision of Clause IV. According to John Rentoul, the SWP and its allies were not against the war at all, but in favour of Saddam Hussein winning. John Rees has said: "Socialists should unconditionally stand with the oppressed against the oppressor, even if the people who run the oppressed country are undemocratic and persecute minorities, like Saddam Hussein."

According to Rees, discussions with George Galloway about establishing a new group had begun to coalesce in December 2002. In England and Wales around January 2004 the SWP began an involvement in Respect – The Unity Coalition, an electoral alliance with a single Member of Parliament, the ex-Labour MP George Galloway, and a small number of councillors. The coalition between the SWP and Galloway's group finally collapsed in Autumn 2007 with both sides blaming the other for the split.

After the schism, a faction led by the SWP formed the Left List (now called Left Alternative). In Scotland, the SWP existed as a platform of the Scottish Socialist Party, but in August 2006, it split from the SSP to pursue a new political grouping with Tommy Sheridan's Solidarity, founded a few months after Sheridan's successful defamation case, but before his eventual conviction for perjury in 2010. That year, the SWP joined the Trade Unionist and Socialist Coalition and stood five candidates in the general election.

The jazz musician Gilad Atzmon performed at SWP events for several years from 2004, and was promoted by the party as delivering "fearless tirades against Zionism". Because Atzmon believed the text of The Protocols of the Elders of Zion, a hoax from the early 20th century, was a valid reflection of contemporary America, Oliver Kamm wrote in The Times in 2006 that the SWP were "allying with classic anti-Semitism". Atzmon and the SWP were similarly accused by other writers. The party eventually severed their association with Atzmon.

=== Incidents and Central Committee resignations ===
In January 2009, Rees, German and Nineham resigned from the Central Committee at party conference before forming an oppositional Left Platform in the party in October 2009, with the support of 64 members. The faction agreed to disband after the party's January 2010 conference. Two members of the Left Platform were expelled over allegations of secret factionalising outside the three-month period before conference in which open factions are permitted. The expulsions were contested at the 2010 conference but a majority of the delegates voted in favour of the expulsions, which were ratified. In February 2010, sixty former members of the Left Platform, including Rees, German and Nineham resigned from the SWP. In response to the 2008 financial crisis, the SWP initiated the Right to Work campaign in June 2009.

In October 2009, the SWP's then National Secretary Martin Smith was charged with assaulting a police officer at the Unite Against Fascism (UAF) demonstration against BNP leader Nick Griffin's appearance on the BBC's Question Time programme. Smith was found guilty of the assault at South Western Magistrates' Court, London, on 7 September 2010. He was sentenced to a 12-month community order, with 80 hours' unpaid work, and was fined £450 pending an appeal. (Smith was arrested again in July 2012 at a UAF demonstration against the EDL in Bristol.)Following a UAF demonstration against the English Defence League (EDL) in Bolton on 20 March 2010, SWP Central Committee member Weyman Bennett was charged with conspiracy to incite violent disorder but the charge was dropped in November 2010.

On 22 May 2010, around 100 SWP members disrupted negotiations between Unite and British Airways inside the Acas building, much to both parties' disapproval. The talks had to be abandoned. Martin Smith claimed on Channel 4 News that the actions of Willie Walsh, then BA chief executive, were far worse. In the 2010 general election the SWP joined the Trade Unionist and Socialist Coalition; this alliance received 0.04% of the vote.

In April 2011, Chris Bambery, one of the last two Central Committee members to have worked alongside Cliff and the organiser of the Right To Work campaign, resigned from the party, arguing in his resignation letter that it was ridden with factionalism, that he had learned about the founding of RTW from Party Notes and that the party had no credible strategy to fight the government's cuts agenda. Bambery's resignation was followed by 38 members in Scotland with the intention of forming a new Marxist grouping north of the border. 50 ex-members of the SWP formed the International Socialist Group shortly thereafter.

=== Internal crisis over allegations of rape ===
A Disputes Committee document was discussed at the party conference in January 2013 about allegations of sexual assault and rape made by a 19-year-old female member against former SWP National Secretary Martin Smith (internally called 'Comrade Delta'). Allegations about Smith's behaviour had been made for several years within the group, the first in 2010. The police have never charged Smith.

A transcript was leaked to the Socialist Unity Network website shortly after the January conference, and the party's perceived failure to adequately resolve the issue resulted in strong internal criticism. One member of the disputes committee had asserted that the party had "no faith in the bourgeois court system to deliver justice". Journalist Laurie Penny and Socialist Worker journalist Tom Walker wrote that the allegations were investigated and dismissed by friends of the accused. Penny added that the alleged victim and her friends were harassed by other party members. Journalist John Palmer, a one-time International Socialists member, pointed to problems with the policy of democratic centralism as it had been adopted by Cliff, but Alex Callinicos defended the party's version of Leninism and called the situation involving Smith "a difficult disciplinary case" in the February issue of the party's monthly Socialist Review magazine.

In an official statement via Charlie Kimber, the party's Central Committee said the issue was an internal matter, insisting that "we strongly condemn" the release of the conference transcript and that "this case is closed". On his Lenin's Tomb blog, Richard Seymour criticised the party's leadership. Along with his fellow writer and (then) SWP member China Miéville and others, Seymour was involved with the internal opposition's blog, International Socialism, established in January 2013. According to Alex Callinicos: "the internal opposition are accountable to no one for these actions. They offer an unappetising lesson in what happens when power is exercised without responsibility". The Guardian reported that a woman who complained about rape in the SWP claimed she was asked a number of offensive questions about her sexual past and drinking habits. Another Guardian article suggested that instead of dealing with the rape allegation, the SWP preferred to talk about its internal organisation, thereby protecting its leadership. A report by Shiv Malik and Nick Cohen published by The Guardian in March said that further allegations of rape have been made internally against another party member.

On 10 March, a special conference was held in which Seymour and Miéville's faction was defeated, and the central committee insisted the report about the complaint against Smith "that no rape had occurred" be accepted. Seymour, who later accused "the leadership" of "rigged debates and gerrymandered votes", announced his resignation, while the newly established International Socialist Network gained more than 100 former SWP members.

Julie Sherry, a member of the Central Committee, responded in The Guardian to allegations of the party's sexism. Sherry replaced a member of the Central Committee who disapproved of the handling of the case, while Sherry's father was a member of the Disputes Committee who found the allegation of misconduct against Smith "not proven". Journalist Owen Jones speculated in January that "the era of the SWP and its kind is over."

After the publicity surrounding the SWP's response to this rape allegation, a number of critics on the left called those in leadership positions "rape apologists"—for instance, these allegations were publicly aired and were the basis of a walkout in protest against SWP candidates at the National Union of Students (NUS) meeting in April 2013. The Socialist Workers' Student Society has been active at many universities, but suffered a serious decline in membership as the 'Comrade Delta scandal' unfolded.

Smith was reported to have resigned from the SWP in July 2013. According to Alex Callinicos in June 2014, around 700 members of the SWP had resigned from the group.

The SWP published a review of its Disputes Committee in December 2013. The Committee noted that it had taken on board submissions from members and a number of disciplinary processes in place in trade unions and other organisations.

In May 2024, the SWP issued a statement on the 2013 crisis in which it apologised for its handling of the cases brought by Comrade W and Comrade X. rs21, set up by people who left the SWP in 2013, asked why the statement had been published 11 years after the event. The same point was made in the Weekly Worker.

== Leadership ==
The leadership is formed by a central committee, and a national committee. Elections to the central committee are held at the national conference each January. As of 2023 the central committee members were: Alex Callinicos, Amy Leather, Camilla R, Charlie Kimber, Héctor Puente Sierra, Jessica Walsh, Joseph Choonara, Julie Sherry, Lewis Nielsen, Mark Thomas, Michael Bradley, Nadia Sayed, Sophia Beach, Tomáš Tengely Evans and Weyman Bennett.

The national committee consists of 51 members elected annually at national conference. At least four party councils a year are to be arranged by the central committee. At these councils two delegates elected from each branch plus the national committee will be entitled to attend.

== Theory ==
Duncan Hallas, a founding member of the IS, predecessor of the SWP, wrote: "The founders of the group saw themselves as mainstream Trotskyists, differing on important questions from the dominant group in the International, but belonging to the same basic tendency." Here "the group" refers to the Socialist Review Group, forerunner of the SWP and "the International" to the Fourth International, the main Trotskyist grouping.

The SWP describes itself as a "revolutionary socialist party" and considers itself to stand in the tradition of Leon Trotsky. It also shares many of the political positions of other Trotskyist groups, a tradition rooted in Marxism and Leninism (see for example Tony Cliff, Marxism at the Millennium.) In common with other Trotskyists the SWP defends the body of ideas codified by the first four Congresses of the Communist International and the founding Congress of the Fourth International of Leon Trotsky in 1938.

Its supporters often refer to their beliefs as 'socialism from below', a term which has been attributed to Hal Draper. This concept can also be traced back to the rules of the First International which stated: "the emancipation of the working classes must be conquered by the working classes themselves." They see this as distinguishing themselves from other socialist groups, particularly both from reformist parties such as the Labour Party (described as a "capitalist workers' party") and from various forms of what they disparagingly term Stalinism—forms of socialism usually associated with the former Soviet Bloc and the old Communist Parties. These are seen as advocating socialism from above. In contrast Cliff argued: "The heart of Marxism is that the emancipation of the working class is the act of the working class. The Communist Manifesto states: 'All previous historical movements were movements of minorities, or in the interest of minorities. The proletarian movement is the self-conscious, independent movement of the immense majority, in the interest of the immense majority.'" For more on this, see Marxism at the Millennium (2000).

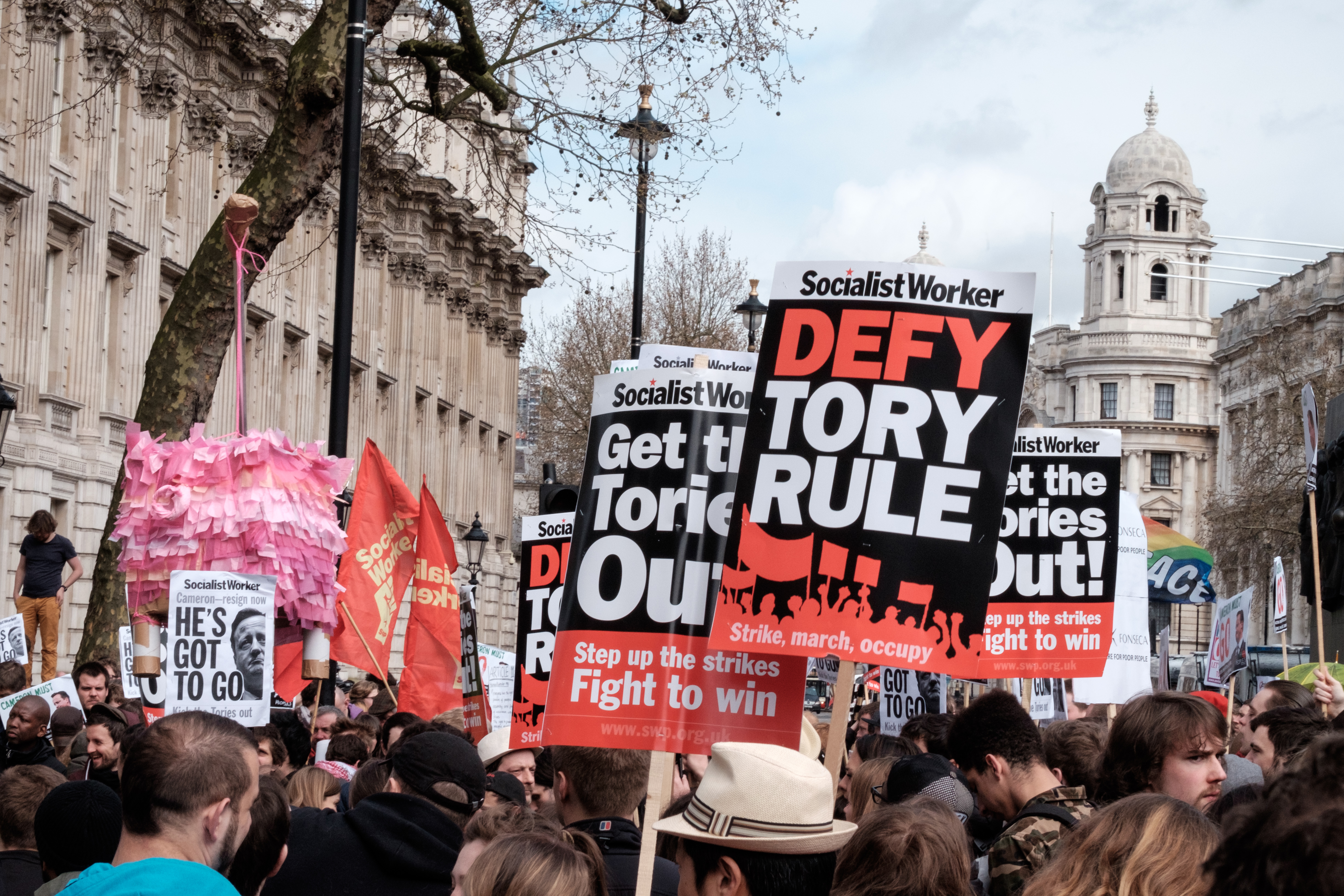
Protesters outside 10 Downing Street calling for David Cameron to resign over the Panama Papers scandal, 9 April 2016

The SWP also seeks to differentiate itself from other Trotskyist tendencies. Three key theories are at the centre of its difference from other Trotskyists: State Capitalism, Deflected Permanent Revolution and The Permanent Arms Economy (see below).

Unlike most Trotskyist organisations, the SWP does not have a formal programme (like the Fourth International's founding document, the Transitional Program), but an outline of the SWP's ideas called "Where We Stand" is published in each issue of Socialist Worker.

=== State capitalism ===
The SWP maintains an opposition to what it terms "substitutionist strategies". This is the idea that social forces other than the proletariat, which is for Marxists the potentially social revolutionary class due to its 'radical chains', may substitute for the proletariat in the struggle for a socialist society (see above). This idea led the founder of the SWP, Tony Cliff, to reject the idea that the USSR was a degenerated workers' state, the position held by other Trotskyists and derived from Leon Trotsky's analysis in the 1930s. Cliff argued that in fact the USSR and Eastern Europe used a form of capitalism which he referred to as 'bureaucratic state capitalist', and that later so did other countries ruled by what he termed Stalinist parties, such as China, Vietnam and Cuba. Cliff's approach to this idea was published in the 1948 article The Nature of Stalinist Russia as it was further advanced on in his 2000 publication Trotskyism after Trotsky where he discussed the decline of the USSR.

Other IS/SWP theoreticians such as Nigel Harris and Chris Harman would later extend and develop a distinct body of state capitalist analysis based on Cliff's initial work. This theory was summed up in the slogan "Neither Washington nor Moscow, but International Socialism". The slogan is said to have originally come from Max Shachtman's group, the Workers Party, in their paper 'Labor Action' and was only borrowed by the IS/SWP at a later date. This is seen as ironic because one of Cliff's concerns when first developing his idea of state capitalism was to differentiate his ideas from the idea of bureaucratic collectivism associated with Shachtman (see for example The Theory of Bureaucratic Collectivism: A Critique (1948)). However, the formula also echoes the Fourth International's 1948 manifesto, Neither Wall Street nor the Kremlin. Cliff's version of the theory of state capitalism can be differentiated from those associated with other dissident Trotskyists and Marxists, such as C. L. R. James and Raya Dunayevskaya.

=== Deflected permanent revolution ===
As a Trotskyist tendency, the SRG/IS was faced with developing an explanation as to why and how a number of countries in the former colonial world had succeeded in overthrowing the rule of various imperial powers and forming states characterised by the SRG/IS as being bureaucratic state capitalist. In part, such an explanation was needed to understand why these colonial revolutions had not developed into uninterrupted or Permanent Revolutions, as predicted by Leon Trotsky in his theory of the same name. Taking Trotsky's theory as his starting point, Tony Cliff developed his own theory of 'deflected permanent revolution'. He argued that where a revolutionary working class did not exist, the intelligentsia could, in certain limited circumstances, take the leadership of the nation and lead a successful revolution in the direction of a state capitalist solution. The outcome of such a revolution would be deflected from the goal of a social revolution as envisaged in Trotsky's original work.

Cliff's essay "Permanent Revolution" was first published in International Socialism Journal, No. 12 Spring 1963, in response to the Cuban Revolution and largely took it and the earlier Chinese Revolution as its subject. However, the general concept of a deflected permanent revolution would be much exercised as a key analytical tool by IS theoreticians in the coming years. Significant in this respect is the work of Nigel Harris in relation to India and later of Mike Gonzalez on Cuba and Nicaragua. The theory has been given a central place in Cem Uzun's work Making the Turkish Revolution (2004).

=== Permanent arms economy ===
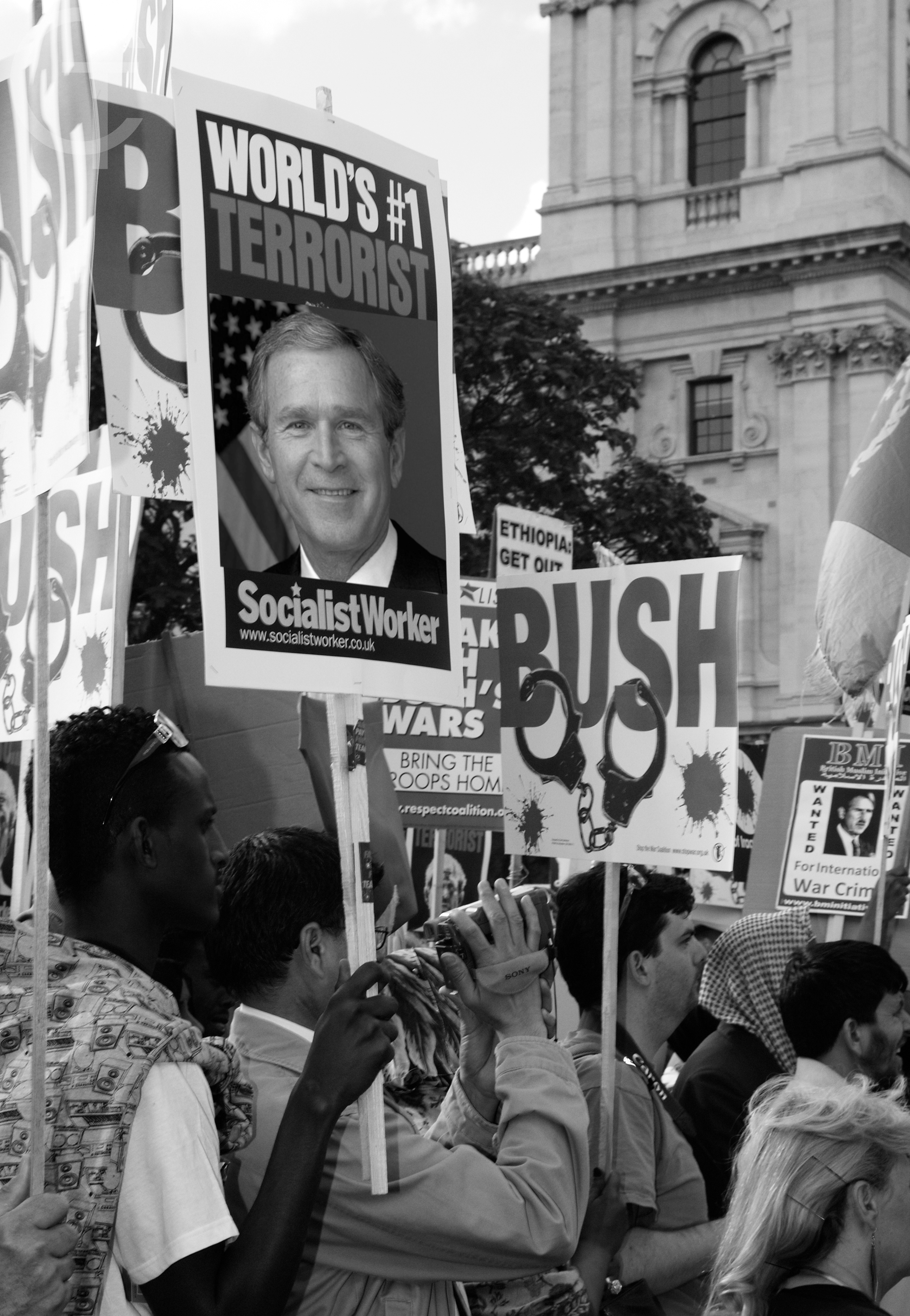
Protest against the Iraq War and George W. Bush in 2008

State capitalism and deflected permanent revolution came to be seen as central to a distinct IS politics by the mid-1960s along with the theory of the permanent arms economy (PAE) which sought to explain the long boom in the global economy after the Second World War. This boom was in contrast to the period after the First World War when a period of stagnation occurred.

The three theories taken together are often seen as being the hallmarks of the IS tradition, although this is contested by some former leaders of the IS, including Nigel Harris and Michael Kidron both of whom worked on the PAE and now repudiate it, and by some other Trotskyists outside the IS Tradition. The PAE, the most contested of the three theories, is also the only one that did not originate with Tony Cliff.

The PAE originated with a member of Max Shachtman's Workers' Party/Independent Socialist League named Ed Sard in 1944. Sard, writing as Walter J. Oakes, argued in Politics that the PAE was to be understood as allowing capitalism to achieve a level of stability by preventing the rate of profit from falling as spending on arms was unproductive and would not lead to the increase of the organic composition of capital. Later in 1951 in New International, this time writing as T. N. Vance, Sard argued that the PAE operated through its ability to apply Keynes' multiplier effect. Although briefly mentioned by Duncan Hallas in a Socialist Review of 1952 the theory was only introduced to the IS by Cliff in 1957.

In his May 1957 article "Perspectives of the Permanent War Economy", Cliff offered the PAE to readers in a version derived from Sard's earlier essays but without reference to Keynes and using a Marxist theoretical framework. This was the only attempt to develop the idea, which it is suggested explains the long post war boom, until the publication of Mike Kidron's Western Capitalism Since the War in 1968. Kidron would further develop the theory in his Capitalism and Theory. Additional work was also contributed by Nigel Harris and later by Chris Harman. However it should also be noted that Mike Kidron was to repudiate the theory as early as the mid-1970s in his essay "Two Insights Don't Make a Theory" in International Socialism No. 100. This was followed by a rejoinder from Chris Harman ("Better a valid insight than a wrong theory").

== Publications ==
The SWP publishes a weekly newspaper called Socialist Worker, and a quarterly theoretical journal called International Socialism. Until 2020 it published a monthly magazine called Socialist Review. It also publishes three editions of a pre-conference Internal Bulletin and a formerly public bulletin called Party Notes as well as various pamphlets and books through Bookmarks, its publishing house.
