= 2008 Green Party of England and Wales leadership election =

British political party election

- 5 September 2008
- Turnout: 2,769 (37.9%)
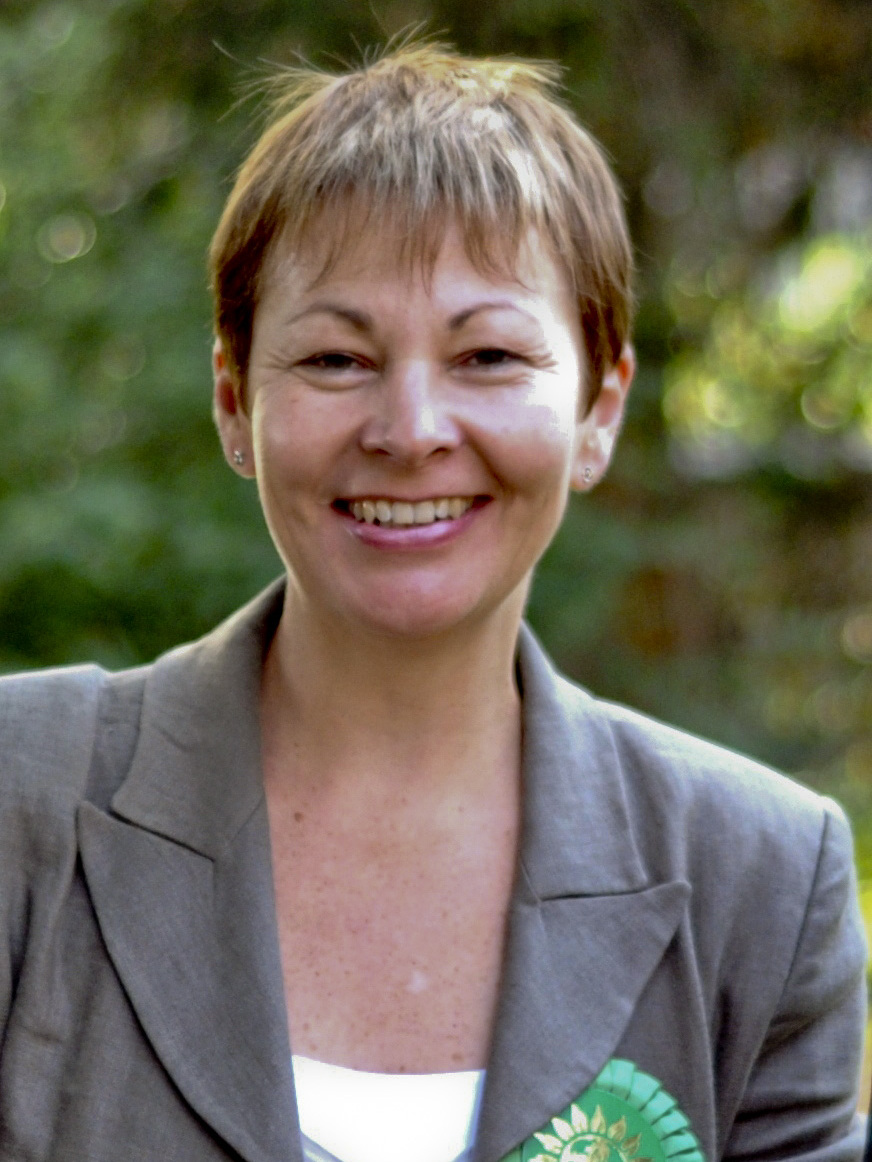

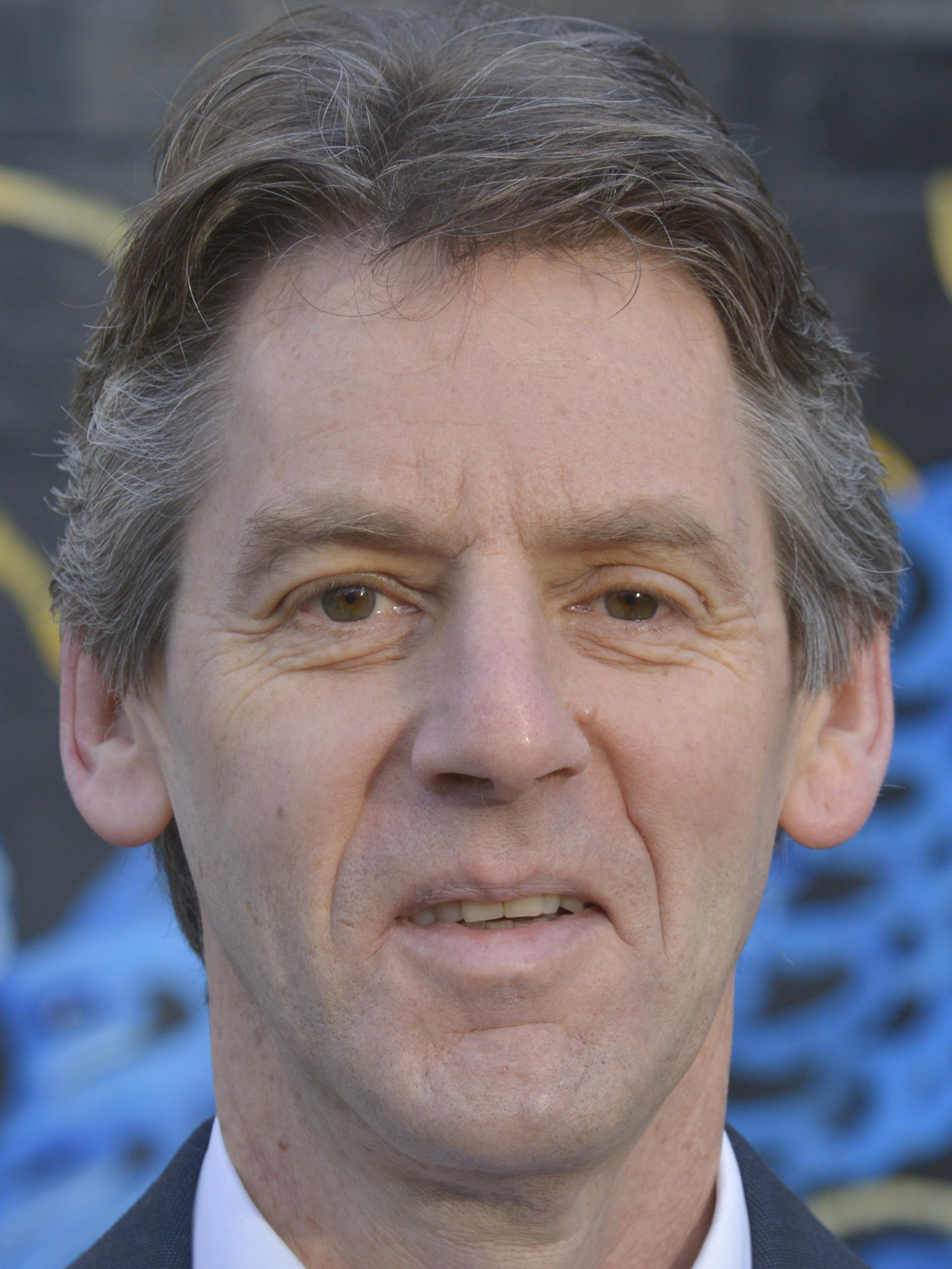
Candidate	Caroline Lucas	Ashley Gunstock
Popular vote	2,559	210
Percentage	92.4%	7.6%
Leader before election
New position
Elected leader
Caroline Lucas

The 2008 Green Party of England and Wales leadership election took place in September 2008 to select the first leader of the Green Party of England and Wales. It was won by Caroline Lucas who received 92.4% of the vote. At the same time, Adrian Ramsay was elected unopposed as the party's first deputy leader.

Prior to the leadership election, the Green Party had two spokespeople called principal speakers instead of leaders. Lucas had been the female principal speaker of the party from 2003 to 2006 and from 2007 to 2008.

== Background ==
From the formation of the Green Party of England and Wales in 1990 until 2008, the party had elected spokespeople called principal speakers instead of leaders. From 1990 to 1992, the party had six principal speakers and from 1992 to 2008, the party had two principal speakers: one male and one female.

In November 2007, the party held an internal referendum on whether they should replace the system of principal speakers with a single leader. The party's female speaker, Caroline Lucas, supported introducing a single leader, as did the party activists Tony Juniper and Jonathon Porritt. The party's male principal speaker, Derek Wall, opposed the change, as did Jenny Jones, one of the party's two members of the London Assembly. The other Assembly Member, Darren Johnson, ran the campaign in favour of moving to a leadership model.

The referendum required two-thirds of members to vote in favour in order to be effective. 73% of party members voted in favour of the change. The new system would involve leaders serving for two year terms, for a maximum of five terms.

== Campaign ==
Caroline Lucas, one of the party's principal speakers and a Member of the European Parliament, launched a campaign for the leadership on 14 July 2008. The other candidate for the leadership was the actor Ashley Gunstock.

Only one candidate stood for the deputy leadership. Adrian Ramsay was the leader of the Green group on Norwich City Council. He was supported Lucas, and under party gender balance rules, he could only be elected to the post if a woman was elected to the leadership.

Nominations for both the leadership and deputy leadership closed on 31 July 2008, after which ballot papers were distributed. In order to assist candidates with canvassing, the party's Standing Orders Committee decided to release the contact details of 7,000 members to the candidates. More than 100 party members signed a protest letter which questioned whether this publication was legal under the Data Protection Act. The issue became moot when all three candidates declined to request contact details.

Hustings took place at the party's conference, and the results were announced on 5 September.

== Results ==
The turnout was 37.9% of a membership of 7,565. This was an increase from the 20% turnout for the 2007 election of principal speakers.

Caroline Lucas speaking as the first Leader of the Green Party of England and Wales at its autumn conference in 2008.

=== Leader ===
Candidate	Votes	%
Caroline Lucas	2,559	92.4%
Ashley Gunstock	210	7.6%
Turnout	2,769	37.9%

=== Deputy leader ===
Adrian Ramsay was elected unopposed as deputy leader.
