= 2010 Redbridge London Borough Council election =

2010 local election in England

Map of the results of the 2010 Redbridge council election. Conservatives in blue, Labour in red and Liberal Democrats in yellow.

Elections for Redbridge London Borough Council were held on 6 May 2010. The 2010 General Election and other local elections took place on the same day.

In London council elections the entire council is elected every four years.

== Results ==
Redbridge Council election result 2010
Party	Seats	Gains	Losses	Net gain/loss	Seats %	Votes %	Votes	+/−
Conservative	30	0	4	-4	47.62	36.73	127,595	
Labour	26	8	1	+7	41.27	37.16	129,086	
Liberal Democrats	7	1	3	-2	11.11	22.60	78,510	
Green	0	0	0	0	0.00	1.28	4,457	
BNP	0	0	1	-1	0.00	1.28	4,454	
UKIP	0	0	0	0	0.00	0.43	1,511	
Respect	0	0	0	0	0.00	0.37	1,282	
Independent	0	0	0	0	0.00	0.11	371	
CPA	0	0	0	0	0.00	0.04	153	

- Turnout: 62.41% (+24.01% since the last local election)
- Total Votes: 347,419

== Group leadership, mayoralty and cabinet ==
- Conservative Party: Keith Prince (Barkingside, Conservative Leader, Leader of the Council and Cabinet Member for Finance)
- Liberal Democrats: Ian Bond (Roding, LibDem Leader, Deputy Leader of the Council and Cabinet Member for Resources)
- Labour Party: Jas Athwal (Mayfield, Labour Leader)
- Redbridge Independent Group: Filly Maravala (Loxford, Independent Leader)
- Mayor: Felicity Banks (Roding, LibDem)
- Deputy Major: Tania Solomon (Barkingside, Conservative)
- Cabinet Member for Highways, Environment & Crime: Shoaib Patel (Valentines, LibDem)
- Cabinet Member for Adult Social Services and Health: John Fairley-Churchill (Bridge, Conservative)
- Cabinet Member for Regeneration, Business & Communities: Thomas Chan (Wanstead, Conservative)
- Cabinet Member for Leisure & Youth Services: Ashok Kumar (Cranbrook, Conservative)
- Cabinet Member for Planning & Public Protection: Alex Wilson (Wanstead, Conservative)
- Cabinet Member for Housing: Michelle Dunn (Wanstead, Conservative)
- Cabinet Member for Children's Services: Alan Weinberg (Clayhall, Conservative)

== Ward results ==
- Candidates in italics won the seat for the party at the 2006 local elections and have now lost it.

=== Aldborough ===
Aldborough Ward
Party	Candidate	Votes	%	±%
Conservative	Vanessa Cole	2,806	42.9	
Conservative	Ruth Clark	2,706	41.4	
Labour	Mike Figg	2,663	40.7	
Labour	Mark Epstein	2,602	39.8	
Conservative	Loraine Sladden	2,497	38.2	
Labour	Debbie Thiara	2,432	37.2	
Liberal Democrats	Catherine Davies	979	15.0	
Liberal Democrats	Christopher Greaves	840	12.9	
Liberal Democrats	Susan Mann	786	12.0	
Turnout		6,536	63.8	+24.3
Conservative hold		Swing		
Conservative hold		Swing		
Labour gain from Conservative		Swing		

=== Barkingside ===
Barkingside Ward
Party	Candidate	Votes	%	±%
Conservative	Ashley Kissin	2,861	46.1	
Conservative	Keith Prince	2,808	45.3	
Conservative	Tania Solomon	2,734	44.1	
Labour	Kamran Choudhry	2,239	36.1	
Labour	Sanjib Bhattacharjee	2,130	34.3	
Labour	Matthew Kay	2,111	34.0	
Liberal Democrats	Varughese Matthews	881	14.2	
Liberal Democrats	Stephanie Sinclair	749	12.1	
Liberal Democrats	Allan Yeoman	641	10.3	
Green	Jonathan Buckner	383	6.2	
Turnout		6,203	65.9	+24.7
Conservative hold		Swing		
Conservative hold		Swing		
Conservative hold		Swing		

=== Bridge ===
Bridge Ward
Party	Candidate	Votes	%	±%
Conservative	Paul Canal	2,538	45.1	
Conservative	John Fairley-Churchill	2,484	44.2	
Conservative	Robin Turbefield	2,161	38.4	
Labour	Garry Chick-Mackay	1,579	28.1	
Labour	David Pearce	1,297	23.1	
Labour	Chris Stone	1,241	22.1	
Liberal Democrats	Janet Cornish	1,032	18.4	
Liberal Democrats	Pat Ilett	1,015	18.1	
Liberal Democrats	Angela Yeoman	1,012	18.0	
BNP	Danny Warville	751	13.4	
Turnout		5,623	65.2	+30.2
Conservative hold		Swing		
Conservative hold		Swing		
Conservative hold		Swing		

=== Chadwell ===
Chadwell Ward
Party	Candidate	Votes	%	±%
Labour	Mark Gittens	1,949	32.8	
Labour	Andy Walker	1,804	30.3	
Labour	Baldesh Kaur Nijjar	1,724	29.0	
Liberal Democrats	John Tyne	1,638	27.5	
Liberal Democrats	Ralph Scott	1,637	27.5	
Conservative	Ashley Heller	1,472	24.8	
Liberal Democrats	Riaz Uddin*	1,412	23.7	
Conservative	Anthony Lenaghan	1,327	22.3	
Conservative	Ali Azeem	1,323	22.2	
Green	Wilson Chowdhry	897	15.1	
Green	Juliet Chowdhry	571	9.6	
UKIP	Paul Wiffen	482	8.1	
Green	Isla Martin	398	6.7	
Turnout		5,947	59.96	+21.56
Labour gain from Liberal Democrats		Swing		
Labour gain from Liberal Democrats		Swing		
Labour gain from Liberal Democrats		Swing		

- Gary Peter Staight for the Liberal Democrats was elected here in 2006.

=== Church End ===
Church End Ward
Party	Candidate	Votes	%	±%
Liberal Democrats	Hugh Cleaver	2,972	51.7	
Liberal Democrats	Richard Hoskins	2,885	50.2	
Liberal Democrats	Nicola Sinclair	2,771	48.2	
Conservative	Iseult Roche	1,700	29.6	
Conservative	Lilette Ebrahimkahn	1,605	27.9	
Conservative	Rashid Ebrahimkahn	1,522	26.5	
Labour	Peter Bradley	974	17.0	
Labour	Paul Daintry	873	15.2	
Labour	David Lee	853	14.8	
Green	Theresa Reynolds	453	7.9	
Turnout		5,746	67.49	+24.79
Liberal Democrats hold		Swing		
Liberal Democrats hold		Swing		
Liberal Democrats hold		Swing		

=== Clayhall ===
Clayhall Ward
Party	Candidate	Votes	%	±%
Labour	Gurdial Bhamra	2,811	41.5	
Conservative	Robert Cole	2,774	41.0	
Conservative	Alan Weinberg	2,769	40.9	
Conservative	Ronnie Barden	2,662	39.3	
Labour	Mark Gowrikaran	2,651	39.2	
Labour	Lesley Hilton	2,547	37.6	
Liberal Democrats	Harjinder Singh	993	14.7	
Liberal Democrats	Sonia Gable	954	14.1	
Liberal Democrats	Anne Peterson	792	11.7	
Turnout		6,770	68.5	+25.3
Labour gain from Conservative		Swing		
Conservative hold		Swing		
Conservative hold		Swing		

=== Clementswood ===
Clementswood Ward
Party	Candidate	Votes	%	±%
Labour	Muhammed Javed	2,457	47.4	
Labour	Helen Coomb	2,442	47.1	
Labour	Zulfi Hussain	2,390	46.1	
Liberal Democrats	Butt Zahid	1,631	31.5	
Liberal Democrats	Irfan Mustafa	1,419	27.4	
Liberal Democrats	Jagdev Singh Purewal	1,394	26.9	
Conservative	Ghazanfer Ali	1,268	24.5	
Conservative	Thane Thaneswaran	962	18.5	
Conservative	Imran Wahid	850	16.4	
Turnout		5,186	53.25	+22.85
Labour hold		Swing		
Labour hold		Swing		
Labour hold		Swing		

=== Cranbrook ===
Cranbrook Ward
Party	Candidate	Votes	%	±%
Conservative	Mahboob Chaudhary	2,393	41.3	
Labour	Mushtaq Ahmed	2,303	39.8	
Conservative	Ashok Kumar	2,191	37.8	
Labour	Ken Turner	2,018	34.9	
Conservative	Gary Monro	1,960	33.9	
Labour	Surinder Pahl	1,956	33.8	
Liberal Democrats	Sabar Iqbal	1,049	18.1	
Liberal Democrats	Mark Hortop	945	16.3	
Liberal Democrats	Shamim Jhetam	667	11.5	
Independent	Nick Johnson	371	6.4	
Turnout		5,790	62.7	+23.9
Conservative hold		Swing		
Labour gain from Conservative		Swing		
Conservative hold		Swing		

=== Fairlop ===
Fairlop Ward
Party	Candidate	Votes	%	±%
Conservative	Brian Lambert	2,915	50.3	
Conservative	Joyce Ryan	2,778	47.9	
Conservative	Alex Phillips	2,566	44.2	
Labour	Peter Hoy	1,688	29.1	
Labour	Owen Guerin	1,674	28.9	
Labour	Baris Yerli	1,390	24.0	
Liberal Democrats	Susan Hamlyn	805	13.9	
Liberal Democrats	Leslie Hutchines	796	13.7	
Liberal Democrats	Pamela Winbourne	657	11.3	
BNP	Jim Clift	601	10.4	
Turnout		5,800	62.2	+24.8
Conservative hold		Swing		
Conservative hold		Swing		
Conservative hold		Swing		

=== Fullwell ===
Fullwell Ward
Party	Candidate	Votes	%	±%
Conservative	Ann Candy	3,012	50.6	
Conservative	Harry Moth	2,875	48.3	
Conservative	Nick Hayes	2,769	46.5	
Labour	Alex Hinds	1,765	29.6	
Labour	Liz Pearce	1,699	28.5	
Labour	Alan Rodney	1,536	25.8	
Liberal Democrats	Dominic Black	980	16.5	
Liberal Democrats	Gary House	808	13.6	
Liberal Democrats	Alison McBrayne	787	13.2	
UKIP	Alan Shaw	422	7.1	
Turnout		5,957	63.2	+24.9
Conservative hold		Swing		
Conservative hold		Swing		
Conservative hold		Swing		

=== Goodmayes ===
Goodmayes Ward
Party	Candidate	Votes	%	±%
Labour	Bert Jones	2,504	46.6	
Labour	Ali Hai	2,452	45.6	
Labour	Barbara White	2,285	42.5	
Liberal Democrats	Satnam Singh*	1,485	27.6	
Conservative	Mosheraf Ashraf	1,324	24.6	
Conservative	Savita Sharma	1,320	24.6	
Liberal Democrats	Azfar Ejaz	1,285	23.9	
Liberal Democrats	Jesse Boucher	1,261	23.5	
Conservative	Alicja Borkowska	1,158	21.5	
Turnout		5,374	58.59	+22.79
Labour hold		Swing		
Labour hold		Swing		
Labour hold		Swing		

- Elected as a Labour Party candidate in 2006.

=== Hainault ===
Hainault Ward
Party	Candidate	Votes	%	±%
Conservative	Thomas Gray	2,006	37.9	
Conservative	Ted Griffin	1,835	34.7	
Conservative	David Poole	1,747	33.0	
Labour	Roy Emmett	1,684	31.9	
Labour	Mark Santos	1,533	29.0	
Labour	Valerie Sproit	1,444	27.3	
BNP	Russell Matthews	910	17.2	
BNP	Julian Leppert	894	16.9	
BNP	Victoria Moore	748	14.2	
Liberal Democrats	Malcolm Swallow	549	10.4	
Liberal Democrats	Valerie Taylor	543	10.3	
Liberal Democrats	Deanna Seeff	530	10.0	
UKIP	Brian Waite*	340	6.4	
UKIP	Alan Hughes	267	5.1	
Turnout		5,286	58.1	+19.8
Conservative gain from BNP		Swing		
Conservative hold		Swing		
Conservative hold		Swing		

^{*}Elected as a Conservative in 2006.

=== Loxford ===
Loxford Ward
Party	Candidate	Votes	%	±%
Labour	Filly Maravala	3,403	62.7	
Labour	Taifur Rashid	3,057	56.3	
Labour	Virendra Tewari	2,829	52.1	
Liberal Democrats	Hamid Khan	1,396	25.7	
Liberal Democrats	Adnan Malik	1,217	22.4	
Liberal Democrats	Faiz Noor	1,128	20.8	
Conservative	Tarlochan Johal	904	16.7	
Conservative	Basharat Hameed	895	16.5	
Conservative	Prerna Sian	773	14.2	
Turnout		5,426	51.94	+21.27
Labour hold		Swing		
Labour hold		Swing		
Labour hold		Swing		

=== Mayfield ===
Mayfield Ward
Party	Candidate	Votes	%	±%
Labour	Jas Athwal*	3,100	50.2	
Labour	Ayodhiya Parkash	2,857	46.3	
Labour	Kay Flint*	2,850	46.2	
Conservative	Surendra Patel	1,771	28.7	
Conservative	Dennis Aylen	1,732	28.1	
Conservative	Renu Phull	1,555	25.2	
Liberal Democrats	Robert Boulton	900	14.6	
Liberal Democrats	Leonard Filtness	702	11.4	
Liberal Democrats	Hazel Redshaw	614	9.9	
Respect	Baharul Shayeb	437	7.1	
Respect	Anhar Rouf	428	6.9	
Respect	Hilal Miah	417	6.8	
Turnout		6,172	63.35	+22.45
Labour hold		Swing		
Labour gain from Conservative		Swing		
Labour gain from Conservative		Swing		

- Labour gain two seats from the Conservative Party.

=== Monkhams ===
Monkhams Ward
Party	Candidate	Votes	%	±%
Conservative	Linda Huggett	3,062	51.8	
Conservative	Michael Stark	2,972	50.3	
Conservative	Jim O'Shea	2,937	49.7	
Liberal Democrats	Anne Crook	1,890	32.0	
Liberal Democrats	Geoff Seeff	1,710	28.9	
Liberal Democrats	Steven Warwick	1,572	26.7	
Labour	Richard Everett	835	14.1	
Labour	Angela Rayner	662	11.2	
Labour	Frank White	532	9.0	
UKIP	Nick Jones	359	6.1	
Turnout		5,909	68.75	+25.75
Conservative hold		Swing		
Conservative hold		Swing		
Conservative hold		Swing		

=== Newbury ===
Newbury Ward
Party	Candidate	Votes	%	±%
Labour	Thavathuray Jeyaranjan	3,305	47.1	
Labour	Dev Sharma	3,262	46.5	
Labour	Elaine Norman	3,246	46.3	
Conservative	David Fineberg	2,248	32.0	
Conservative	Abdus Hamid	2,132	30.4	
Conservative	Habib Rehman	1,990	28.4	
Liberal Democrats	Narendra Dattani	1,128	16.1	
Liberal Democrats	Colin Mann	1,097	15.6	
Liberal Democrats	Gulam Robbani	985	14.0	
Turnout		7,016	64.47	+25.67
Labour hold		Swing		
Labour hold		Swing		
Labour hold		Swing		

=== Roding ===
Roding Ward
Party	Candidate	Votes	%	±%
Liberal Democrats	Felicity Banks	2,260	40.4	
Liberal Democrats	Ian Bond	2,110	37.7	
Liberal Democrats	Gwyneth Deakins	2,025	36.2	
Conservative	Tony Loffhagen	1,852	33.1	
Conservative	Melvyn Marks	1,811	32.4	
Conservative	Lisa Morgan	1,713	30.6	
Labour	Imtiaz Ahmed	1,234	22.1	
Labour	Wes Streeting	1,145	20.5	
Labour	Neelum Naqvi	1,107	19.8	
BNP	John Hughes	326	5.8	
Turnout		5,591	64.8	+24.8
Liberal Democrats hold		Swing		
Liberal Democrats hold		Swing		
Liberal Democrats hold		Swing		

=== Seven Kings ===
Seven Kings Ward
Party	Candidate	Votes	%	±%
Labour	Stuart Bellwood	3,081	51.9	
Labour	Bob Littlewood	2,940	49.5	
Labour	Balvinder Saund	2,901	48.9	
Conservative	Sarup Singh	1,558	26.3	
Conservative	Richard Firmstone	1,552	26.1	
Conservative	Zubi Quddos	1,438	24.2	
Liberal Democrats	Aftab Ahmad	1,117	18.8	
Liberal Democrats	Ben Brown	1,007	17.0	
Liberal Democrats	Gary Staight	899	15.1	
Turnout		5,935	59.97	+26.97
Labour hold		Swing		
Labour hold		Swing		
Labour hold		Swing		

=== Snaresbrook ===
Snaresbrook Ward
Party	Candidate	Votes	%	±%
Conservative	Sue Nolan	2,651	42.8	
Conservative	Christopher Cummins	2,642	42.6	
Conservative	Peter Goody	2,537	40.9	
Labour	Greg Eglin	1,940	31.3	
Labour	Sophia Eglin	1,915	30.9	
Labour	Paul Devaney	1,861	30.0	
Liberal Democrats	Claire Hunt	1,177	19.0	
Liberal Democrats	John Swallow	1,109	17.9	
Liberal Democrats	Levent Chetinkaja	1,025	16.5	
Green	Deborah Fink	596	9.6	
CPA	Katherine Mills	153	2.5	
Turnout		6,201	67.9	+24.0
Conservative hold		Swing		
Conservative hold		Swing		
Conservative hold		Swing		

=== Valentines ===
Valentines Ward
Party	Candidate	Votes	%	±%
Liberal Democrats	Shoaib Patel*	2,191	40.6	
Labour	Aziz Choudhary	2,032	37.6	
Labour	Ross Hatfull	2,001	37.0	
Liberal Democrats	Farrukh Islam	1,965	36.4	
Liberal Democrats	Gurdip Singh Hundal	1,948	36.1	
Labour	Sareena Sanger	1,912	35.4	
Conservative	Ikram Wahid	1,161	21.5	
Conservative	Rosemarie Barden	1,129	20.9	
Conservative	Reg Woda	954	17.7	
Turnout		5,402	57.09	+21.29
Liberal Democrats gain from Labour		Swing		
Labour hold		Swing		
Labour hold		Swing		

- Liberal Democrat gain a seat from Labour since the 2006 election.

=== Wanstead ===
Wanstead Ward
Party	Candidate	Votes	%	±%
Conservative	Michelle Dunn	2,408	39.1	
Conservative	Alex Wilson	2,326	37.8	
Conservative	Thomas Chan	2,214	35.9	
Labour	Jeffery Edelman	1,892	30.7	
Labour	Elizabeth Holford	1,805	29.3	
Labour	Paul Merry	1,682	27.3	
Liberal Democrats	Alan Cornish	1,427	23.2	
Liberal Democrats	Katherine Garrett	1,289	20.9	
Liberal Democrats	Qamar Zaman	1,042	16.9	
Green	Ashley Gunstock	484	7.9	
Green	David Reynolds	422	6.8	
Green	Terence Stokes	253	4.1	
BNP	John Down	224	3.6	
Turnout		6,161	69.5	+24.6
Conservative hold		Swing		
Conservative hold		Swing		
Conservative hold		Swing		
