= Havering and Redbridge (London Assembly constituency) =

- Territorial constituency for the London Assembly
- Havering and Redbridge shown within London
- Created: 2000
- Number of members: One
- Member: Keith Prince
- Party: Reform UK
- Last election: 2024
- Next election: 2028

Havering and Redbridge is a territorial constituency represented on the London Assembly by one Assembly Member (AM). The constituency was created in 2000 at the same time as the London Assembly and has elections every four years. It consists of the combined area of the London Borough of Havering and the London Borough of Redbridge. The current assembly member is Keith Prince of Reform UK who was first elected in 2016.

== Constituency profile ==
Created in 2000, Havering and Redbridge has elected only Conservative AMs to date. The current AM is Keith Prince, first elected in 2016.

The Conservative win upon its creation in 2000 was somewhat unexpected, as at that point, the vast majority of the area it covers (excluding two Redbridge wards that fall under the Chingford and Woodford Green parliamentary seat) was represented by Labour MPs. However, the Romford and Upminster constituencies were among the very small number of seats that the Conservatives gained from Labour at the subsequent general election of 2001.

In line with this, the Conservative majority increased here in 2004, while the trend towards the Conservatives in this area of London continued in the 2005 general election result, which saw the Conservatives winning increased majorities in the two seats they already held, whilst also gaining the constituencies of Hornchurch and Ilford North from Labour. Consequently, this London Assembly seat became very safe for the Conservatives in the 2008 election, where they got more than twice as many votes as Labour.

The seat has, however, become extremely marginal in recent years, following a swing of almost 12% to Labour in the 2012 election. This swing against the Conservatives preluded Labour gaining a majority on Redbridge Council in 2014 for the first time since its creation, the Conservatives losing overall control on Havering Council and Labour gaining the Ilford North seat back from the Conservatives at the 2015 general election. The seat became slightly more marginal in 2016, but it was not enough for Labour to gain it. The Conservatives increased their majority in 2021, and held the seat again in 2024.

Keith Prince defected to Reform UK on 4 October 2025.

== Assembly members ==
Year	Member	Party
2000	Roger Evans	Conservative
2016	Keith Prince	Conservative
2025	Keith Prince	Reform UK

== Assembly election results ==
On 4 October 2025, Keith Prince joined Reform UK.

2024 London Assembly election: Havering and Redbridge
Party	Candidate	Constituency			List		
Party	Candidate	Votes	%	±%	Votes	%	±%
Conservative	Keith Prince	65,037	37.9	-8.1	62,200	36.3	
Labour	Guy Williams	49,561	28.9	-8.0	50,941	29.7	
Reform	Alex Wilson	19,696	11.5	+8.4	17,718	10.3	
Green	Kim Arrowsmith	15,010	8.8	+0.7	13,727	8.0	
Independent	Mohammed Asif	11,768	6.9	New			
Liberal Democrats	Fraser Coppin	8,240	4.8	0.0	7,955	4.6	
Britain First					3,894	2.3	
Rejoin EU					3,250	1.9	
Animal Welfare					2,964	1.7	
Independent	Farah London				2,832	1.7	
TUSC	Andy Walker	2,145	1.3	+0.2			
CPA					1,884	1.1	
SDP					1,705	1.0	
Independent	Laurence Fox				1,257	0.7	
Communist					636	0.4	
Heritage					338	0.2	
Independent	Gabe Romualdo				172	0.1	
Majority		15,476	9.0	-0.1			
Valid votes		171,457			171,473		
Invalid votes		1,274			1,239		
Turnout		172,731	42.91		172,712	42.91	
Conservative hold		Swing					

2021 London Assembly election: Havering and Redbridge
Party	Candidate	Votes	%	±%
Conservative	Keith Prince	77,268	46.0	+8.3
Labour	Judith Garfield	61,941	36.9	0.0
Green	Melanie Collins	13,685	8.1	+2.5
Liberal Democrats	Thomas Clarke	8,150	4.8	+0.7
Reform	Richard Tice	5,143	3.1	New
TUSC	Andy Walker	1,856	1.1	New
Majority		15,327	9.1	+8.3
Total formal votes		168,043		
Informal votes		2,741		
Turnout		170,784		
Conservative hold		Swing		

2016 London Assembly election: Havering and Redbridge
Party	Candidate	Votes	%	±%
Conservative	Keith Prince	64,483	37.7	+0.1
Labour	Ivana Bartoletti	63,045	36.9	+2.1
UKIP	Lawrence Webb	26,788	15.7	+9.0
Green	Lee Burkwood	9,617	5.6	+1.9
Liberal Democrats	Ian Sanderson	7,105	4.1	−0.4
Majority		1,438	0.8	−2.0
Total formal votes		171,038	99.0	+0.4
Informal votes		1768	1.0	−0.4
Turnout		172,806	45.0	+8.1
Conservative hold		Swing		

2012 London Assembly election: Havering and Redbridge
Party	Candidate	Votes	%	±%
Conservative	Roger Evans	53,285	37.6	−10.1
Labour	Mandy Richards	49,346	34.8	+13.3
UKIP	Lawrence Webb	9,471	6.7	−0.7
Residents' Association of London	Malvin Brown	8,239	5.8	New
Liberal Democrats	Farrukh Islam	6,435	4.5	−2.9
BNP	Robert Taylor	5,234	3.7	New
Green	Haroon Said	5,207	3.7	−1.9
English Democrat	Mark Twiddy	2,573	1.8	−2.1
National Front	Richard Edmonds	1,936	1.4	New
Majority		3,939	2.8	−22.8
Total formal votes		141,726	98.6	
Informal votes		1,993	1.4	
Turnout		143,759	36.9	−8.6
Conservative hold		Swing		

2008 London Assembly election: Havering and Redbridge
Party	Candidate	Votes	%	±%
Conservative	Roger Evans	78,493	46.7	+13.1
Labour	Balvinder Saund	35,468	21.1	–0.6
Liberal Democrats	Farrukh Islam	12,443	7.4	–6.8
UKIP	Lawrence Webb	12,203	7.3	–6.9
Green	Ashley Gunstock	9,126	5.4	+0.7
English Democrat	Leo Brookes	6,487	3.9	New
Christian (CPA)	Paula Warren	5,533	3.3	+1.0
Independent	Peter Thorogood	3,450	2.1	+0.9
Left List	Carole Vincent	1,473	0.9	New
Majority		43,025	25.6	+12.7
Turnout		167,922	45.5	+8.6
Conservative hold		Swing		

2004 London Assembly election: Havering and Redbridge
Party	Candidate	Votes	%	±%
Conservative	Roger Evans	44,723	34.6	–2.9
Labour	Keith Darvill	28,017	21.7	–8.3
UKIP	Lawrence Webb	18,297	14.2	New
Liberal Democrats	Matthew Lake	13,646	10.6	–2.3
Residents' Association of London	Malvin Brown	6,925	5.4	–6.4
Green	Ashley Gunstock	6,009	4.7	–1.5
Respect	Abdurahman Jafar	5,185	4.0	New
CPA	Juliet Hawkins	2,917	2.3	New
National Liberal	David Stephens	2,031	1.6	New
Independent	Peter Thorogood	1,597	1.2	New
Majority		16,706	12.9	+5.4
Turnout		129,347	36.9	+6.1
Conservative hold		Swing		

2000 London Assembly election: Havering and Redbridge
Party	Candidate	Votes	%	±%
Conservative	Roger Evans	40,919	37.5	N/A
Labour	Chris Robbins	32,650	30.0	N/A
Liberal Democrats	Geoffrey Seeff	14,028	12.9	N/A
Havering Residents Association	Ian Wilkes	12,831	11.8	N/A
Green	Ashley Gunstock	6,803	6.2	N/A
London Socialist	George Taylor	1,744	1.6	N/A
Majority		8,269	7.5	N/A
Turnout		108,975	30.8	N/A
Conservative win (new seat)				

== Mayoral election results ==
Below are the results for the candidate which received the highest share of the popular vote in the constituency at each mayoral election.

Year	Party	Candidate
2000	Independent	Ken Livingstone
2004	Conservative	Steve Norris
2008	Conservative	Boris Johnson
2012	Conservative	Boris Johnson
2016	Conservative	Zac Goldsmith
2021	Conservative	Shaun Bailey
2024	Conservative	Susan Hall

2024 London mayoral election (Havering and Redbridge)
Party	Candidate	Votes	%	±%
Conservative	Susan Hall	82,859	48.1	N/A
Labour	Sadiq Khan	50,780	29.5	N/A
Green	Zoë Garbett	7,859	4.56	N/A
Reform	Howard Cox	7,554	4.39	N/A
Liberal Democrats	Rob Blackie	6,417	3.73	N/A
Independent	Tarun Ghulati	3,692	2.14	N/A
Independent	Natalie Campbell	2,775	1.61	N/A
SDP	Amy Gallagher	2,252	1.31	N/A
Britain First	Nick Scanlon	2,023	1.17	N/A
Independent	Andreas Michli	2,000	1.16	N/A
Animal Welfare	Femy Amin	1,986	1.15	N/A
Count Binface for Mayor of London	Count Binface	1,466	0.851	N/A
London Real	Brian Rose	592	0.344	N/A
Turnout		172,852	42.9%	+0.504%
Rejected ballots		597		
Registered electors		402,497		−0.0231%

2021 London mayoral election (Havering and Redbridge)
Party	Candidate	1st round		2nd round			1st round votesTransfer votes, 2nd round
Party	Candidate	Total	Of round	Transfers	Total	Of round	1st round votesTransfer votes, 2nd round
Conservative	Shaun Bailey	82,361	50.3%				
Labour	Sadiq Khan	49,818	30.4%				
Green	Siân Berry	7,967	4.86%				
Independent	Niko Omilana	3,900	2.38%				
Liberal Democrats	Luisa Porritt	3,669	2.24%				
Reclaim	Laurence Fox	3,644	2.22%				
London Real	Brian Rose	1,782	1.09%				
UKIP	Peter John Gammons	1,454	0.888%				
Rejoin EU	Richard Hewison	1,352	0.825%				
Count Binface for Mayor of London	Count Binface	1,188	0.725%				
Let London Live	Piers Corbyn	1,047	0.639%				
Animal Welfare	Vanessa Hudson	1,027	0.627%				
Heritage	David Kurten	947	0.578%				
Women's Equality	Mandu Reid	863	0.527%				
Independent	Farah London	637	0.389%				
Independent	Nims Obunge	609	0.372%				
SDP	Steve Kelleher	508	0.31%				
Renew	Kam Balayev	463	0.283%				
Independent	Max Fosh	339	0.207%				
Burning Pink	Valerie Brown	238	0.145%				
Turnout		170,784	42.4%				
Registered electors		402,404					

2016 London mayoral election (Havering and Redbridge)
Party	Candidate	1st round		2nd round			1st round votesTransfer votes, 2nd round
Party	Candidate	Total	Of round	Transfers	Total	Of round	1st round votesTransfer votes, 2nd round
Conservative	Zac Goldsmith	75,299	44.3%				
Labour	Sadiq Khan	59,711	35.2%				
UKIP	Peter Whittle	12,292	7.24%				
Green	Siân Berry	6,290	3.7%				
Liberal Democrats	Caroline Pidgeon	5,631	3.32%				
Britain First	Paul Golding	3,078	1.81%				
Respect	George Galloway	2,594	1.53%				
Women's Equality	Sophie Walker	2,058	1.21%				
BNP	David Furness	1,086	0.639%				
Cannabis is Safer than Alcohol	Lee Eli Harris	1,055	0.621%				
Independent	Prince Zylinski	464	0.273%				
One Love	Ankit Love	281	0.165%				
Turnout		172,815	45.1%				
Registered electors		383,037					

2012 London mayoral election (Havering and Redbridge)
Party	Candidate	1st round		2nd round			1st round votesTransfer votes, 2nd round
Party	Candidate	Total	Of round	Transfers	Total	Of round	1st round votesTransfer votes, 2nd round
Conservative	Boris Johnson	73,601	51.9%				
Labour	Ken Livingstone	48,525	34.2%				
UKIP	Lawrence Webb	4,774	3.37%				
Liberal Democrats	Brian Paddick	4,031	2.85%				
Independent	Siobhan Benita	3,976	2.81%				
Green	Jenny Jones	3,582	2.53%				
BNP	Carlos Cortiglia	3,198	2.26%				
Turnout		144,058	37%				
Registered electors		389,814					

2008 London mayoral election (Havering and Redbridge)
Party	Candidate	1st round		2nd round			1st round votesTransfer votes, 2nd round
Party	Candidate	Total	Of round	Transfers	Total	Of round	1st round votesTransfer votes, 2nd round
Conservative	Boris Johnson	87,302	52.8%				
Labour	Ken Livingstone	45,915	27.8%				
Liberal Democrats	Brian Paddick	12,149	7.34%				
BNP	Richard Barnbrook	9,563	5.78%				
Christian Choice	Alan Craig	2,957	1.79%				
Green	Siân Berry	2,906	1.76%				
UKIP	Gerard Batten	2,537	1.53%				
English Democrat	Matt O'Connor	1,050	0.635%				
Left List	Lindsey German	671	0.406%				
Independent	Winston McKenzie	368	0.222%				
Turnout		168,101	45.5%				
Registered electors		369,407					

2004 London mayoral election (Havering and Redbridge)
Party	Candidate	1st round		2nd round			1st round votesTransfer votes, 2nd round
Party	Candidate	Total	Of round	Transfers	Total	Of round	1st round votesTransfer votes, 2nd round
Conservative	Steve Norris	46,925	35.4%				
Labour	Ken Livingstone	39,526	29.8%				
Liberal Democrats	Simon Hughes	15,494	11.7%				
UKIP	Frank Maloney	12,835	9.68%				
BNP	Julian Leppert	7,350	5.54%				
Respect	Lindsey German	3,450	2.6%				
Green	Darren Johnson	2,886	2.18%				
CPA	Ram Gidoomal	2,797	2.11%				
Independent Working Class Action	Lorna Reid	838	0.632%				
Independent	Tammy Nagalingam	455	0.343%				
Turnout		136,584	39%				
Registered electors		350,651					

2000 London mayoral election (Havering and Redbridge)
Party	Candidate	1st round		2nd round			1st round votesTransfer votes, 2nd round
Party	Candidate	Total	Of round	Transfers	Total	Of round	1st round votesTransfer votes, 2nd round
Independent	Ken Livingstone	39,277	33.8%				
Conservative	Steve Norris	38,088	32.8%				
Labour	Frank Dobson	14,549	12.5%				
Liberal Democrats	Susan Kramer	12,719	10.9%				
BNP	Michael Newland	3,938	3.39%				
CPA	Ram Gidoomal	2,784	2.4%				
Green	Darren Johnson	1,815	1.56%				
UKIP	Damian Hockney	1,619	1.39%				
Pro-Motorist Small Shop	Geoffrey Ben-Nathan	618	0.532%				
Independent	Ashwin Kumar	511	0.44%				
Natural Law	Geoffrey Clements	287	0.247%				
Turnout		118,527	33.5%				
Registered electors		353,685					
