= Caroline Lucas =

British politician (born 1960)

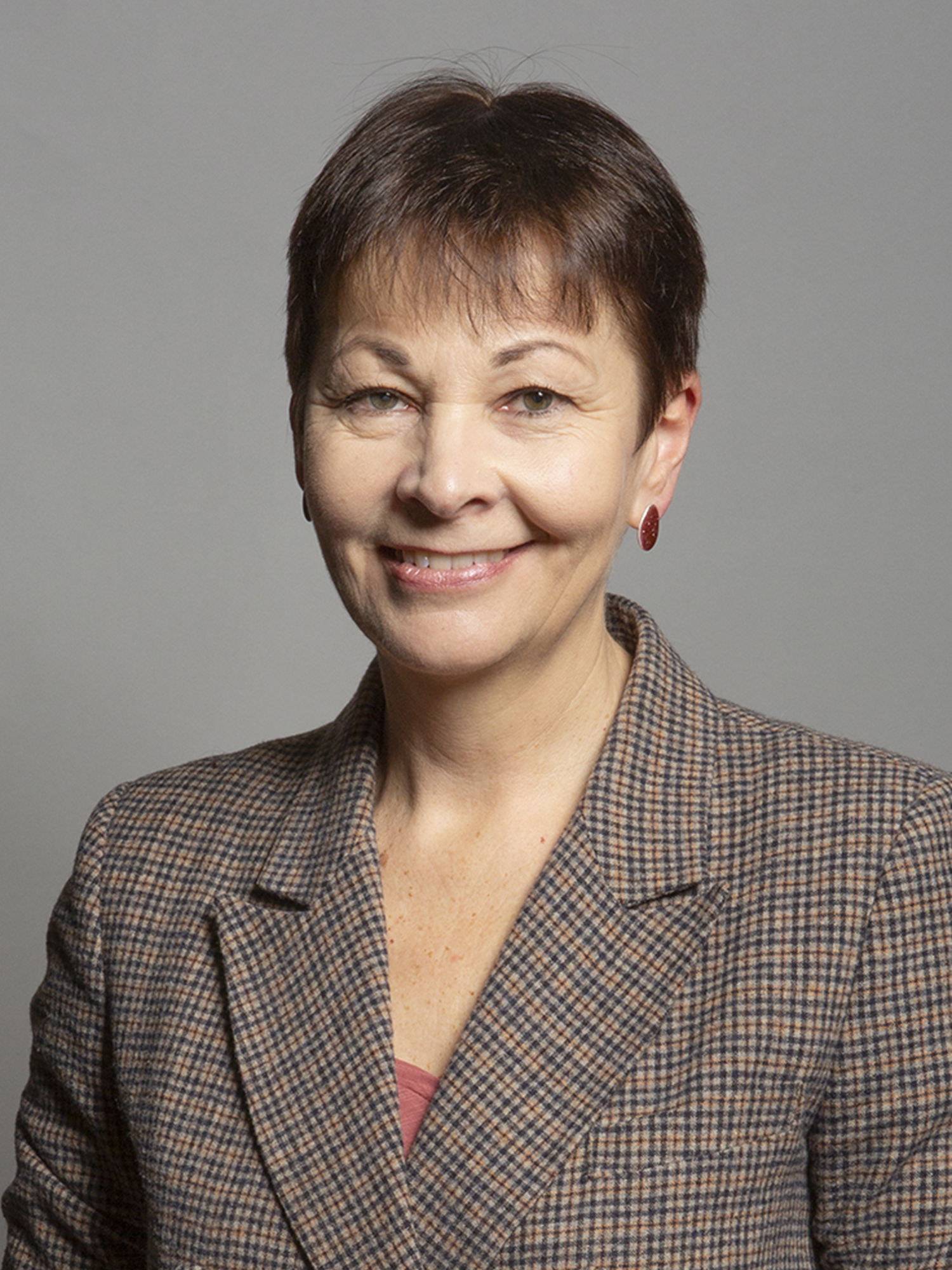
- Official portrait, 2019

Leader of the Green Party of England and Wales (Note: As Principal Female Speaker of the Green Party of England and Wales until 5 September 2008.)
- In office 2 September 2016 – 4 September 2018 Serving with Jonathan Bartley
- Deputy: Amelia Womack
- Preceded by: Natalie Bennett
- Succeeded by: Jonathan Bartley and Siân Berry
- In office 30 November 2007 – 5 September 2012 Serving with Derek Wall (until 5 September 2008)
- Deputy: Adrian Ramsay (2008–2012)
- Preceded by: Siân Berry
- Succeeded by: Natalie Bennett
- In office 30 November 2003 – 24 November 2006 Serving with Mike Woodin; Keith Taylor
- Preceded by: Margaret Wright
- Succeeded by: Siân Berry

Member of Parliament for Brighton Pavilion
- In office 6 May 2010 – 30 May 2024
- Preceded by: David Lepper
- Succeeded by: Siân Berry

Member of the European Parliament for South East England
- In office 14 June 1999 – 6 May 2010
- Preceded by: Constituency established
- Succeeded by: Keith Taylor

Personal details
- Born: Caroline Patricia Lucas; 9 December 1960 (age 65) Malvern, Worcestershire, England
- Party: Green Party of England and Wales (since 1990)
- Other political affiliations: Green Party UK (1986–1990)
- Spouse: Richard Savage (m. 1991)
- Children: 2
- Education: Malvern Girls' College; University of Exeter (BA, PhD); University of Kansas (Dipl.)
- Website: www.carolinelucas.com

Academic background
- Thesis: Writing for Women: a study of woman as reader in Elizabethan romance (1989)

Academic work
- Institutions: University of Sussex

Caroline Patricia Lucas (born 9 December 1960) is a British politician who was the leader of the Green Party of England and Wales from 2003 to 2006, 2007 to 2012, and from 2016 to 2018. She was Member of Parliament (MP) for Brighton Pavilion from 2010 to 2024. She was the Green Party's first MP (although Plaid Cymru's Cynog Dafis was elected on a joint ticket in the 1990s) and their only MP until the 2024 general election.

Born in Malvern in Worcestershire, Lucas graduated from the University of Exeter and the University of Kansas before receiving a PhD from the University of Exeter in 1989. She joined the Green Party in 1986 and held various party roles, also serving on Oxfordshire County Council from 1993 to 1997. She was elected as a Member of the European Parliament (MEP) for South East England in 1999 and re-elected in 2004 and 2009, also serving as the party's female Principal Speaker from 2003 to 2006 and from 2007 to 2008.

Lucas was elected the first leader of the Green Party in 2008 and was selected to represent the constituency of Brighton Pavilion in the 2010 general election, becoming the party's first MP. She stood down as party leader in 2012 to devote more time to her parliamentary duties and focus on the election campaign. She returned as party leader from September 2016 to September 2018, sharing the post with Jonathan Bartley. She stated in June 2023 that she would not stand at the 2024 general election.

== Early life and education ==
Lucas was born in Malvern in Worcestershire, to middle-class, Conservative Party-voting parents, Peter and Valerie (née Griffin) Lucas. She is one of three children. Her father ran a small central heating company, and sold solar panelling. Her mother stayed at home to bring up their children.

Lucas was educated at Malvern Girls' College (which became Malvern St James in 2006), a boarding private school in Great Malvern. She then went to the University of Exeter, where she gained a first-class BA (Hons) in English Literature in 1983. While at university, Lucas went on many trips to Greenham Common women's peace camp and Molesworth peace camp when involved with the Campaign for Nuclear Disarmament (CND). Lucas was an activist in CND and was involved in the Snowball campaign against US military bases in the UK, which involved cutting fences with the expectation of being arrested.

Lucas won a scholarship to attend the University of Kansas between 1983 and 1984, gaining a diploma of journalism, before studying for a PhD degree in English from the University of Exeter, awarded in 1990, with a thesis entitled Writing for women: a study of woman as reader in Elizabethan romance. While completing her doctorate, Lucas worked as a press officer for Oxfam from 1989. She later worked for the charity in other roles, became active in the Green Party, and left Oxfam in 1999.

== Life and career ==
=== Early political career ===
After being "utterly inspired" by Jonathon Porritt's book Seeing Green, Lucas joined the Green Party in 1986. She noticed that the Green Party office was in Clapham, where she was living at the time, so thought: "Right! I'm going there now, I'm just going to dedicate the rest of my life to this party". Soon afterwards she became the party's National Press Officer (1987–1989) and Co-Chair (1989–1990).

When the Green Party became three separate parties in 1990 for the constituent parts of the United Kingdom, she joined the Green Party of England and Wales. Lucas served as their General Election Speaker from 1991 (for the following year's general election) and a Regional Council Member from 1997.

Lucas's first success in an election came when she gained the Green Party's second council seat in the UK on Oxfordshire County Council, which she held between 1993 and 1997.

=== European Parliament ===
Lucas was first elected as a Member of the European Parliament for the South East England Region at the 1999 elections, the first year the election was by proportional representation. In that year, the Green Party gained 7.4% of the vote (110,571 votes). In November 2001, she was convicted of a breach of the peace at the Faslane nuclear base in Scotland the previous February, and was fined £150 for her participation in a CND sit-down protest. Conducting her own defence at the trial, she pleaded not guilty. Lucas argued that she had a right under the Human Rights Act to peaceful protest following on from her firm anti-nuclear attitudes. Faslane is the base used for Britain's Trident nuclear programme. She was arrested for a protest at the same location in January 2007. "It still seems ironic that it is a non-violent demonstration that is judged to be a breach of the peace, rather than Britain's illegal and immoral possession of nuclear weapons", she wrote at the time.

Lucas was re-elected in 2004, gaining 173,351 votes (8% share), and again in the 2009 election when the party's vote under the list system rose to 271,506, or 11.6%. In the European Parliament, she was a member of the Committee for Trade, Industry, Energy and Research; the Committee on the Environment, Public Health and Consumer Policy; the Committee on International Trade; and the Temporary Committee on Climate Change. She held the party's post of Female Principal Speaker from 2003 to 2006 and from 2007 to 2008.

=== First period as leader (2008–2012) ===
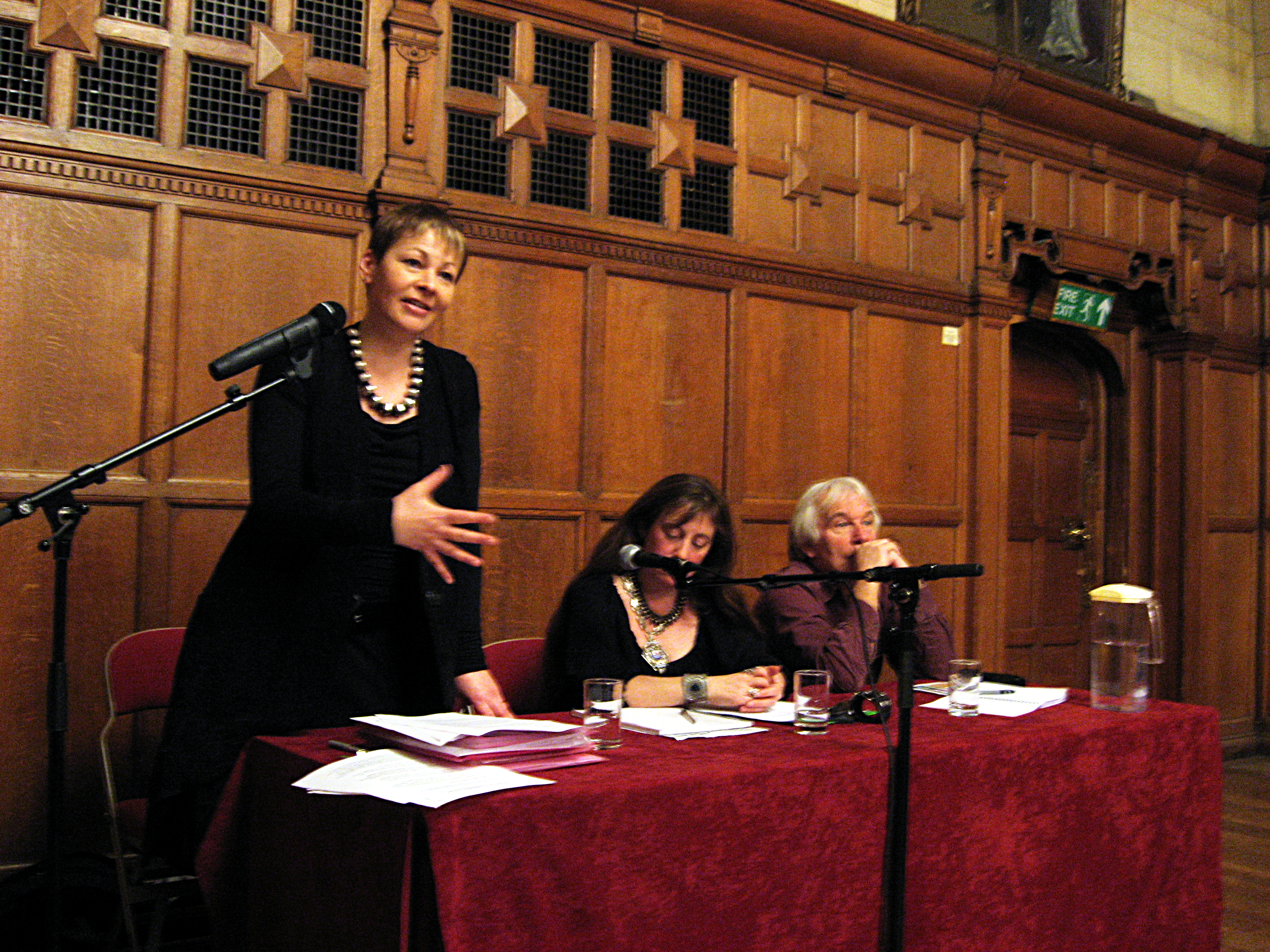
Lucas speaking in Oxford about the "A Green New Deal" report, in 2009

Lucas was elected as the Green Party's first leader on 5 September 2008, gaining 92% of the vote (against one other candidate, Ashley Gunstock) on a turnout of 38%. Previously, the party had operated under a collective leadership. She said the change "was about having a face the country recognises, or hopefully comes to recognise. It was in recognition of the fact that people don't really relate to abstract ideas, they relate more to the people who embody them". Lucas was elected as the Green Party's first-ever MP (for Brighton Pavilion) at the general election of 2010.

In July 2010, Lucas expressed her support for seven campaigners of the Smash EDO campaign who had caused approximately £180,000 damage to the local EDO MBM arms factory and were acquitted of conspiring to cause criminal damage. The jury accepted their defence of lawful excuse – action undertaken to prevent a much worse crime – because the company manufactured and sold certain components used by the Israeli military, notably in its assault on Gaza. Lucas stated that she was "absolutely delighted the jury has recognised that the actions of the decommissioners were a legitimate response to the atrocities being committed in Gaza. I do not advocate non-violent direct action lightly [but] their actions were driven by the responsibility to prevent further suffering in Gaza". In 2011 she voted against the military intervention in Libya.

On 14 May 2012, Lucas announced she would be standing down as leader as of September 2012.

=== Brighton Pavilion ===
Brighton Pavilion had the highest vote in the 2005 general election for a Green Party candidate when Keith Taylor, a former Green Party Principal Speaker, gained 22% of the vote. In 2007, Lucas declared her intention to stand for the Green Party's nomination for the prospective parliamentary candidate in the Brighton Pavilion constituency for the next general election. In a letter to party members, she indicated that she would only stand if she won the internal party selection election by more than 10%, to avoid internal division. On 18 July 2007, it was announced that Lucas had been selected by the Brighton Green Party. Lucas won with 55% of the party ballot against Keith Taylor's 45%.

In May 2010, Lucas was elected as the first solely-Green MP to Westminster with a majority of 1,252 (Cynog Dafis sat as a 'joint ticket' Plaid Cymru-Green MP from 1992 to 1997). She was also the first woman to be elected as an MP for Brighton. Lucas delivered her maiden speech on 27 May 2010.

Lucas opposed the presentation of bare-breasted models on page 3 in The Sun and in 2013 was reprimanded for transgressing the Westminster dress code by wearing a T-shirt with the logo "No More Page Three" to protest against the feature during a Commons debate.

On 19 August 2013, Lucas was arrested at a non-violent protest against Cuadrilla Resources fracking operations in Sussex. She was subsequently charged with obstructing a public highway, but was found not guilty on 17 April 2014 at Brighton Magistrates' Court. Following the hearing, Lucas said: "This judgement is right but this is not a victory or cause for celebration. We will continue to campaign to end fracking and only celebrate when our world is on the path to a clean energy future".

In the 2015 general election, Lucas was re-elected with a much increased majority of 7,967 and vote share. In the 2017 general election Lucas increased her majority to 14,689, elected on 52.3% of the vote. Her vote majority increased again in the 2019 election by 5% with 33,151 votes.

In accord with long-standing Green Party policy, Lucas voted in 2015 for holding the European Union Referendum, but campaigning to stay in the EU with major reform.

On 8 June 2023, Lucas announced she would not be standing at the 2024 general election. On 19 July 2023, it was announced that Siân Berry would be the Green candidate for Lucas' Brighton seat at the next election.

=== Co-leader with Jonathan Bartley ===
On 31 May 2016, it was announced that Lucas would run for the position of the Leader of the Green Party in a job share arrangement with the welfare spokesman Jonathan Bartley in the forthcoming 2016 Green Party leadership election.

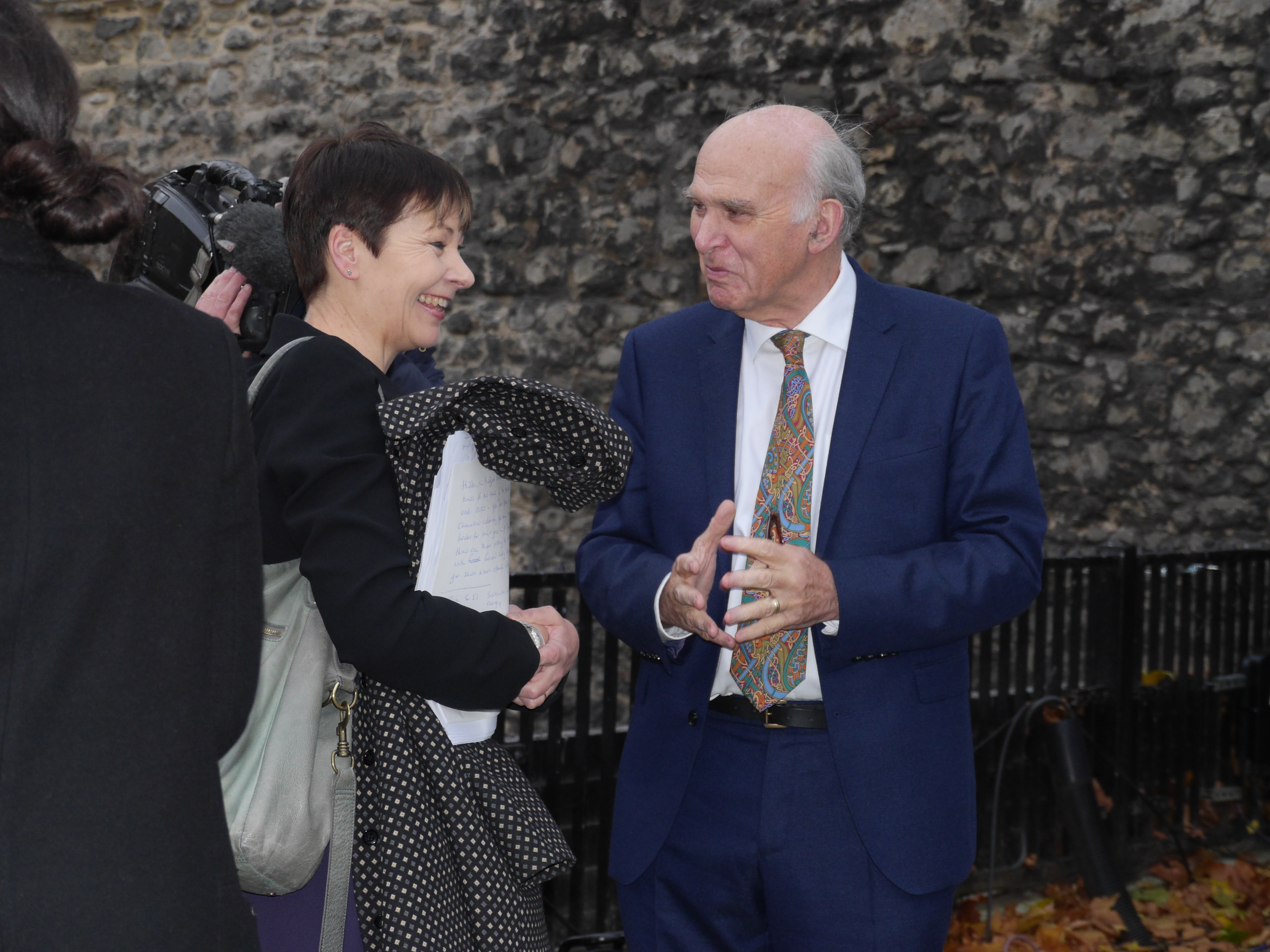
Lucas with Vince Cable, in 2017

On 2 September, it was announced that Lucas and Bartley had been elected with 86% of first-preference votes. Lucas said the party would strive to preserve the rights of EU nationals living in Britain, and EU rules on workers' rights and the environment, among other policies.

On 30 May 2018, Lucas announced that at the end of her two-year term in September, she would not seek re-election as co-leader of the Green Party. In an article for The Guardian, Lucas wrote that "it's now time for me to show the power of letting go".

=== Other roles and views ===
Lucas is a supporter of animal rights and welfare and an advocate for major reform to the food and agricultural system. She served as vice-president of the Royal Society for the Prevention of Cruelty to Animals, but resigned in December 2024 following investigations showing animal cruelty at RSPCA Assured farms. She has encouraged policymakers to consider a meat tax to promote more humane farming methods and incentivise the adoption of plant-based diets to reduce food-related greenhouse gas emissions. In 2021, she expressed support for the Plant Based Treaty and urged the Government to include food system reform in its climate agenda.

Lucas was on the National Council of the Campaign for Nuclear Disarmament since 2004, and is currently a Vice-President. She was Vice-Chair of the All-Party Parliamentary Group on Peak Oil and Gas. A former Vice-President of the Stop the War Coalition, she resigned from the post in December 2015; stating that her "busy parliamentary and constituency schedule means that she doesn't have time to fully engage with the role and, in light of some recent StWC positions that she didn't support, she felt standing down was the responsible thing to do".

Lucas is an advocate for reform of UK drug laws. She has called for the law to have an evidence-based approach to drugs that treats drug abuse as a health matter, rather than a criminal one.

In early 2013, Lucas co-signed a letter that was published in The Guardian newspaper and officially marked her support for the People's Assembly Against Austerity movement. She also gave a speech at the People's Assembly conference, held at Westminster Central Hall on 22 June 2013.

In August 2015, Lucas endorsed Jeremy Corbyn's campaign in the Labour Party leadership election. She wrote in The Independent: "I've never felt so optimistic about a potential leader of the Labour Party. For the first time in my memory, the party of Keir Hardie and Clement Attlee looks likely to be led again by someone who dares to stand up for the radical changes demanded by the challenges we face".

Lucas is a supporter of a permanent universal basic income. In January 2016, Lucas tabled a motion in the British Parliament, calling on the Government to commission research into the effects of a universal basic income and examine its feasibility to replace the UK's existing social security system.

In 2016, she criticised the Government's decision to move ahead with construction of the Hinkley Point C nuclear power station.

On 15 April 2018, she attended the launch event of the People's Vote, a campaign group calling for a public vote on the final Brexit deal between the UK and the European Union.

In August 2019, Lucas was subject to criticism for suggesting the creation of an all-female cabinet, who happened to be all white, as part of a national unity government, to try to stop a no-deal Brexit. Later that year, she criticised the Leader of the House of Commons, Jacob Rees-Mogg, for appearing to recline on a front bench asleep while she was delivering a speech.

In February 2020, she was investigated by the Parliamentary Commissioner for Standards, following a complaint by Michael Fabricant that she had offered a tour of the Commons in exchange for £150, as part of a fundraising drive. Lucas said she did not believe she had done anything wrong. An investigation found she had breached the House of Commons Code of Conduct in offering and giving the tour. The Standards Commissioner also found that it gave her an "unfair advantage over other election candidates". Lucas acknowledged that she had breached the rules and promised not to repeat the breach. The Green Party returned the donation to the supporter who received the tour.

In 2021, Lucas was one of three MPs who successfully took legal action against the Department of Health and Social Care over contracts awarded during the COVID-19 pandemic.

In 2021, Lucas criticised the HS2 high-speed project, saying it was a "vanity project" and that the construction of the high-speed rail project would "emit more carbon than could be saved over decades".

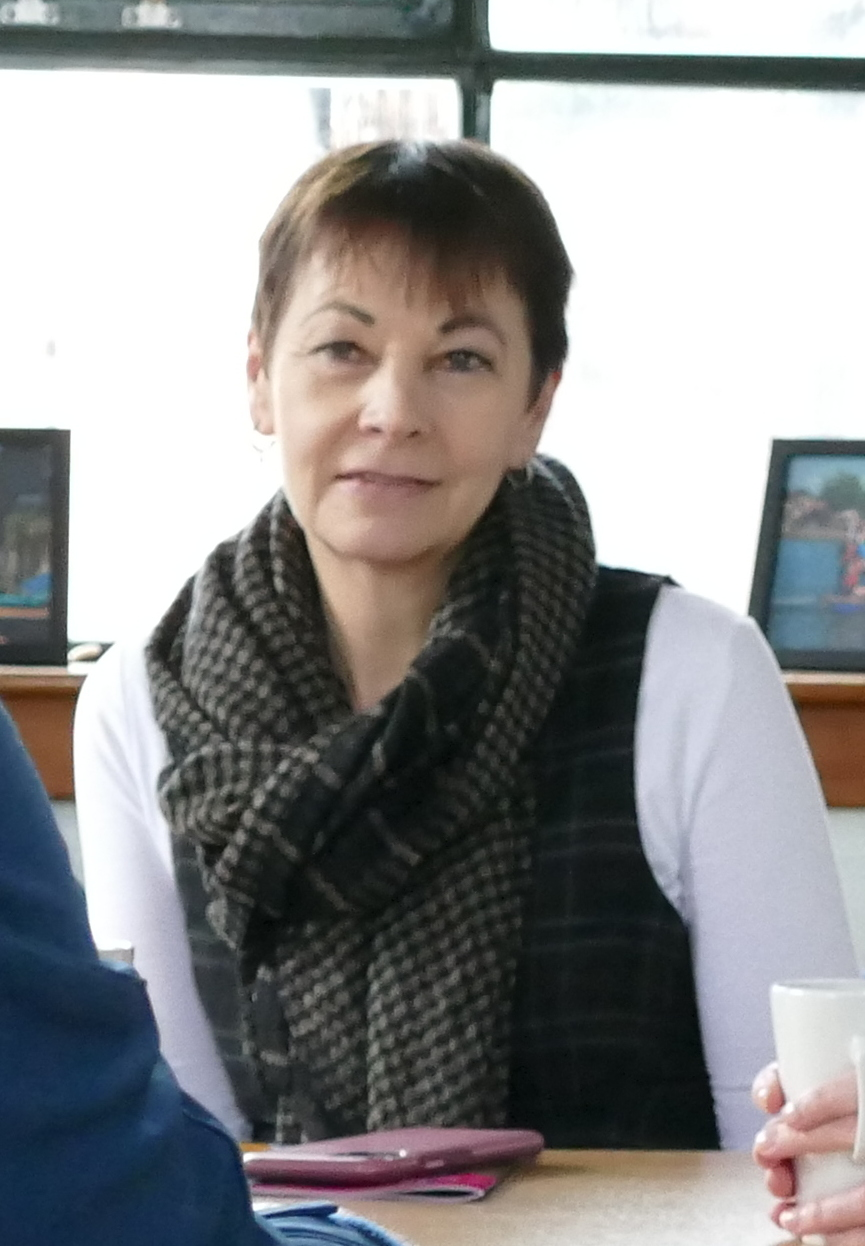
Lucas in 2023

Lucas supports ecocide being made a crime at the International Criminal Court. She also led the campaign for the Climate and Nature Bill, tabling the bill twice over the 2019–24 Parliament, and stated that though "Labour backed its ambition in 2023, whips blocked [its progress] in January 2025".

In October 2025, Lucas was appointed as Professor of Practice in Environmental Sustainability at University of Sussex, based at the newly established Sussex School for Progressive Futures.

In 2026, Lucas opposed the "Zionism is racism" motion passed at the Green Party conference and warned against political entryism in the Green Party.

==== Writing ====
Lucas is a prolific writer of reports, articles, and books on the subjects of trade justice, localisation, globalisation, animal welfare, and food, in which she criticises free trade, a single European currency, trade-led development policies, genetically modified food, and a lack of attention to environmental and social issues.

Her most substantial work is Green Alternatives to Globalisation: A Manifesto (co-authored with Mike Woodin in 2004), which advocates localisation of economies based on minimal trade and greater social and environmental concern, in opposition to neo-liberal, market-led forces of globalisation. A book by Lucas on her time in Parliament, Honourable Friends: Parliament and the Fight for Change, was published in 2015. In April 2024, via Hutchinson Heinemann, Lucas published a book titled Another England: How to Reclaim Our National Story.

== Awards ==
Lucas speaking as the first Leader of the Green Party of England and Wales at its 2008 autumn conference

In her time as a politician and activist, Lucas has won the 2006 Michael Kay Award "for her outstanding contribution to European animal welfare" from the RSPCA. In December 2024, Lucas and Chris Packham resigned from the RSPCA after accusing it of "legitimising cruelty".

Lucas has won the award for "Politician of the Year" in The Observer ethical awards three times. The award is voted for by Observer readers, who chose her to win in 2007, 2009 and 2010. In 2008, she was listed by The Guardian as one of "50 people who could save the planet".

In October 2008, Lucas was winner in the trade category of The Parliament MEP awards 2008, which are voted for by MEPs and NGOs. In April 2010, Lucas won "Best UK Politician" in The Independent green awards and in November 2010, she was awarded "Newcomer of the Year" in The Spectator Parliamentarian of the Year awards. In July 2011, she was awarded "Best All-rounder" in the Total Politics End of Year MP awards and in September 2011, she was awarded "MP of the Year" in the Women in Public Life awards 2011. Also in 2011, Lucas was given the Political Studies Association award for "Influencing the Political Agenda" and voted "Progressive of the Year" in a Left Foot Forward readers' poll.

In November 2020, she was included in the BBC Radio 4 Woman's Hour "Power List" 2020.

== Personal life ==
In 1991, Lucas married Richard Savage. The couple have two sons, one of whom is an academic at the University of California, Santa Barbara.

Lucas is a vegetarian, and told ITV News political correspondent Paul Brand in September 2019 that she is "moving as fast as she can towards being vegan".

== Films ==
In 2016, a short documentary film about Lucas, One Green Seat, directed by Daniel Ifans and produced by We Are Tilt, was an "Official Selection" at the 2017 Artemis Women In Action Film Festival in Santa Monica, California.

== Bibliography ==
=== Books ===
- Green Alternatives to Globalisation: A Manifesto (2004), co-written with Mike Woodin
- Honourable Friends? Parliament and the Fight for Change (2015)
- Another England: How to Reclaim Our National Story (2024)

=== Edited volumes ===
- The Alternative: Towards a New Progressive Politics (2016), co-edited with Lisa Nandy and Chris Bowers

=== Essays and chapters ===
- "The Green case against the Euro" in Everything You Always Wanted to Know About the Euro But Were Afraid to Ask a Tory (1999), edited by Janet Bush
- "Beyond the Growth Fetish" in What the Three Main Parties are not Telling You: A Radical Way Out of Stagnation and Inequality (2015), edited by Michael Meacher
- Foreword in Resurrection Trust (2019), edited by Amanda Saint

== Bibliography ==
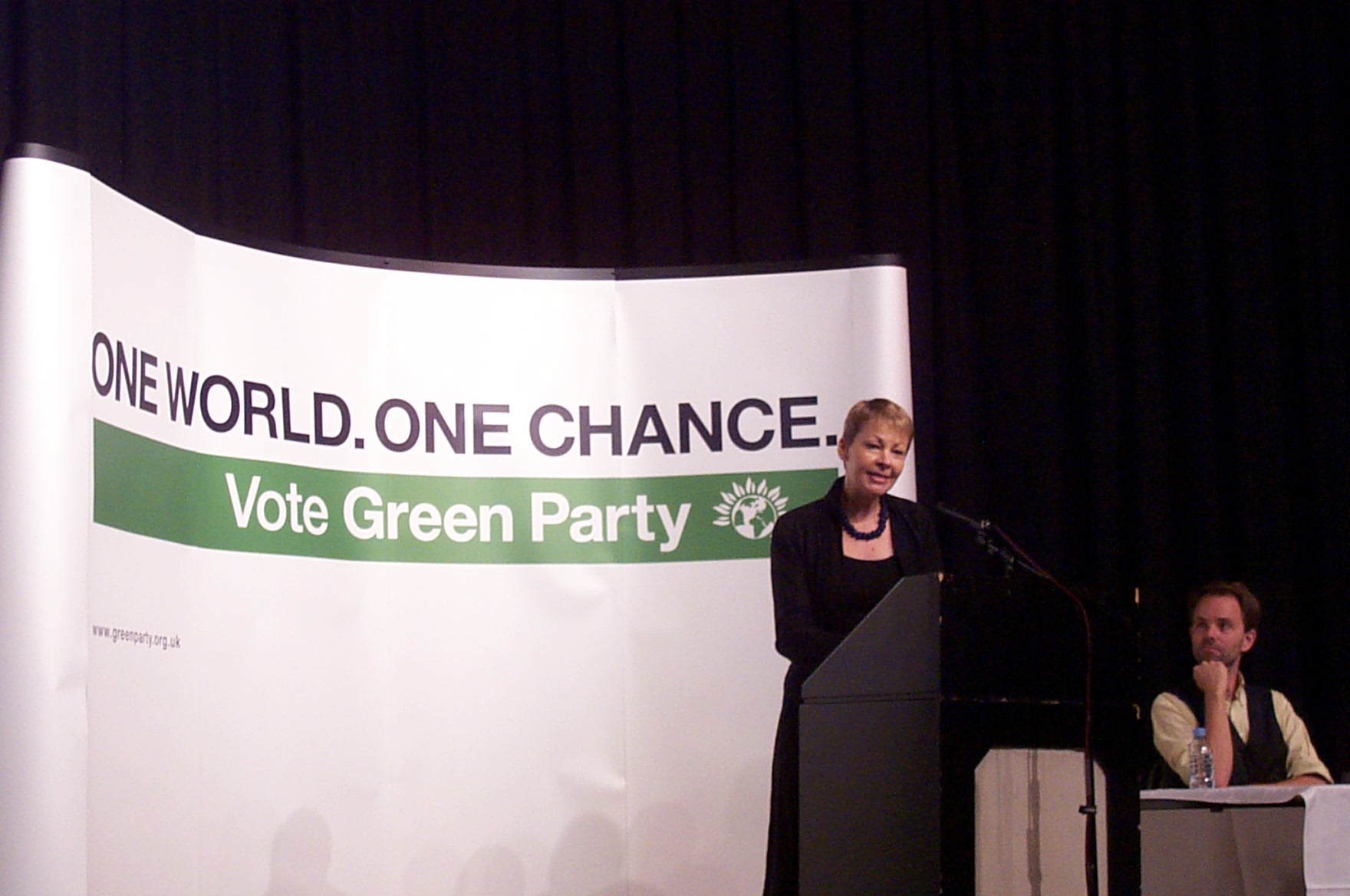
Lucas gives keynote speech at the autumn conference of the Green Party of England and Wales, with Councillor Rupert Read looking on; Hove, 23 September 2006

- Caroline Lucas (2019). "Chapter 24: A political view". In Extinction Rebellion (ed.). This Is Not a Drill: An Extinction Rebellion Handbook. Penguin Books. pp. 141–145. ISBN 9780141991443.
- Bennett, Natalie; Bütikofer, Reinhard; Jeraj, Samir; Jordan, Klina; Juniper, Tony; Lambert, Jean; Lucas, Caroline; Rüdig, Wolfgang; Scott Cato, Molly; Taylor, Keith (2019). Ward, Liam (ed.). Greens for a Better Europe: Twenty Years of Green Influence in the European Parliament, 1999–2019. London: London Publishing Partnership. ISBN 978-1-907994-88-3.
- Fox, Liam; Lucas, Caroline; Lygo, Raymond; Beach, Hugh; Grief, Nick; Haines, Steven; Short, Clare; Hare, Tim; Lewis, Julian; Midgley, Mary (2006). Booth, Ken; Barnaby, Frank (eds.). The Future of Britain's Nuclear Weapons. London: Oxford Research Group. ISBN 978-0-9511361-9-5.
- Lucas, C. P., Woodin, M., Green Alternatives to Globalisation: A Manifesto, 2004 ISBN 978-0-7453-1933-9
- Lucas, C. P., Global Warming, Local Warning: A study of the likely impacts of climate change upon South East England, 2004
- Lucas, C. P., Towards a GM free Europe: Halting the spread of GMOs in Europe, 2003
- Jones, A., Lucas, C. P., Local Food: Benefits and Opportunities, 2003
- Lucas, C. P., Time to Replace Globalisation, 2001
- Lucas, C. P., Which way for the European Union: Radical Reform or Business as Usual?, 2001
- Hines, C., Lucas, C. P., Stopping the Great Food Swap: Relocalising Europe's Food Supply, 2001
- Lucas, C. P., From Seattle to Nice: Challenging the Free Trade Agenda at the Heart of Enlargement, 2000
- Lucas, C. P., Woodin, M., The Euro or a Sustainable Future for Britain? A Green Critique of the Single Currency, 2000
- Lucas, C. P., Watchful in Seattle: World Trade Organisation threats to Public Services, Food and the Environment, 1999
- Lucas, C. P., Reforming World Trade: The Social and Environmental Priorities, 1996
- Coote, B., Lucas, C. P., The Trade Trap, 1994
- Lucas, Caroline (1989). Writing for Women: The Example of Woman as Reader in Elizabethan Romance. Open University Press. p. 176. ISBN 0-335-09017-6.

Party political offices
New office	Leader of the Green Party of England and Wales; 2008–2012	Succeeded by Natalie Bennett
Preceded by Natalie Bennett	Leader of the Green Party of England and Wales; 2016–2018; Served alongside: Jonathan Bartley	Succeeded by Jonathan Bartley; Siân Berry
Parliament of the United Kingdom
Preceded by David Lepper	Member of Parliament for Brighton Pavilion; 2010–2024	Succeeded by Siân Berry
