= Pagham Cricket Club Ground =

Cricket ground in Pagham, West Sussex, England

Coordinates: 50.77898°N 0.73446°W

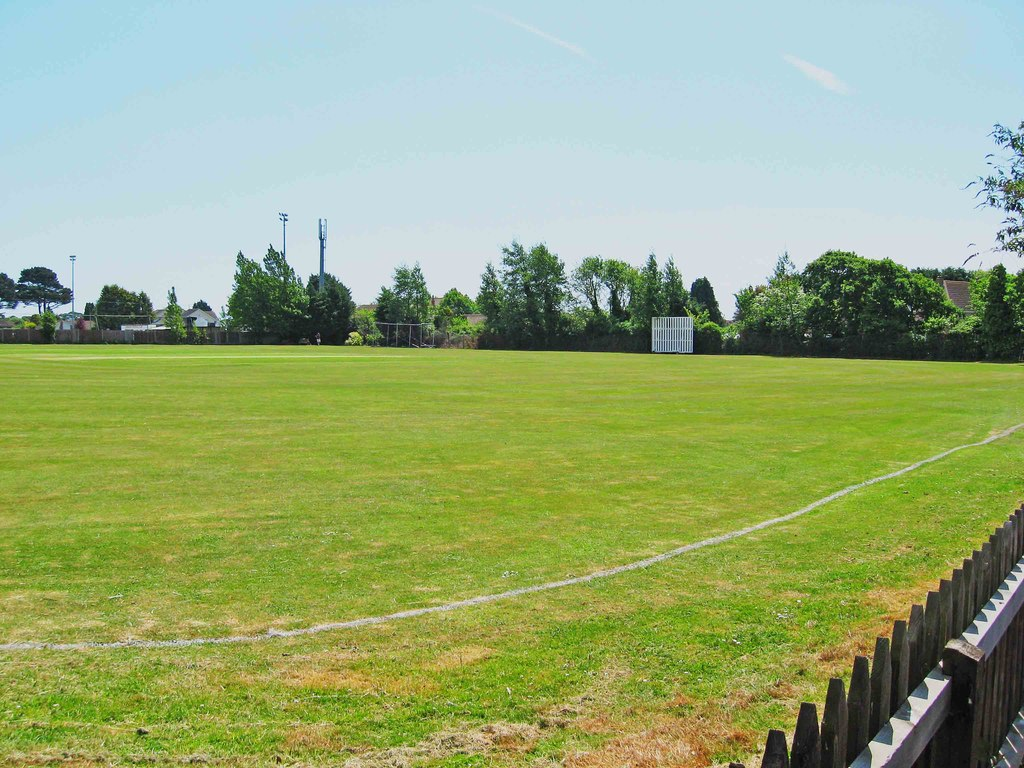
- Interactive map of Pagham Cricket Club Ground

Ground information
- Location: Pagham, Sussex
- Country: England
- Establishment: 1895

Team information
Sussex	(1976–1979)
- As of 26 August 2010; Source: Ground profile

Pagham Cricket Club Ground is a cricket ground in Pagham, Sussex. The first recorded club match on the ground was in 1895.

The ground has been used on two occasions for first class cricket. Firstly in 1976, when Sussex played the first first-class match at the ground against Oxford University. Sussex played the second and final first-class fixture to be held at the ground in 1979 when they played Oxford University. Sussex also used the ground in 1977, when they played Ireland in a non first-class match.

In local domestic cricket, the venue is the home ground of Pagham Cricket Club.

== Records ==
=== First-class ===
- Highest team total: 357/4 by Sussex v Oxford University, 1979
- Lowest team total: 99 by Oxford University v Sussex, 1976
- Highest individual innings: 105 not out by Chris Tavaré for Oxford University v Sussex, 1976
- Best bowling in an innings: 6-33 by Richard Savage for Oxford University v Sussex, 1976
- Best bowling in a match: 12-99 by Richard Savage, as above
