= London Partnership Register =

UK scheme to help formalise same-sex relationships

The London Partnership Register was a scheme to help formalise same-sex relationships set up in 2001 by Ken Livingstone, then Mayor of London, a little over 4 years before the first legally recognised same-sex unions in the United Kingdom (known as "civil partnerships") were introduced by the Civil Partnership Act 2004. In that time, just under 1,000 couples had signed the register, some of whom were among the first to become civil partners on 21 December 2005, the first day that was possible in England and Wales.

== History ==
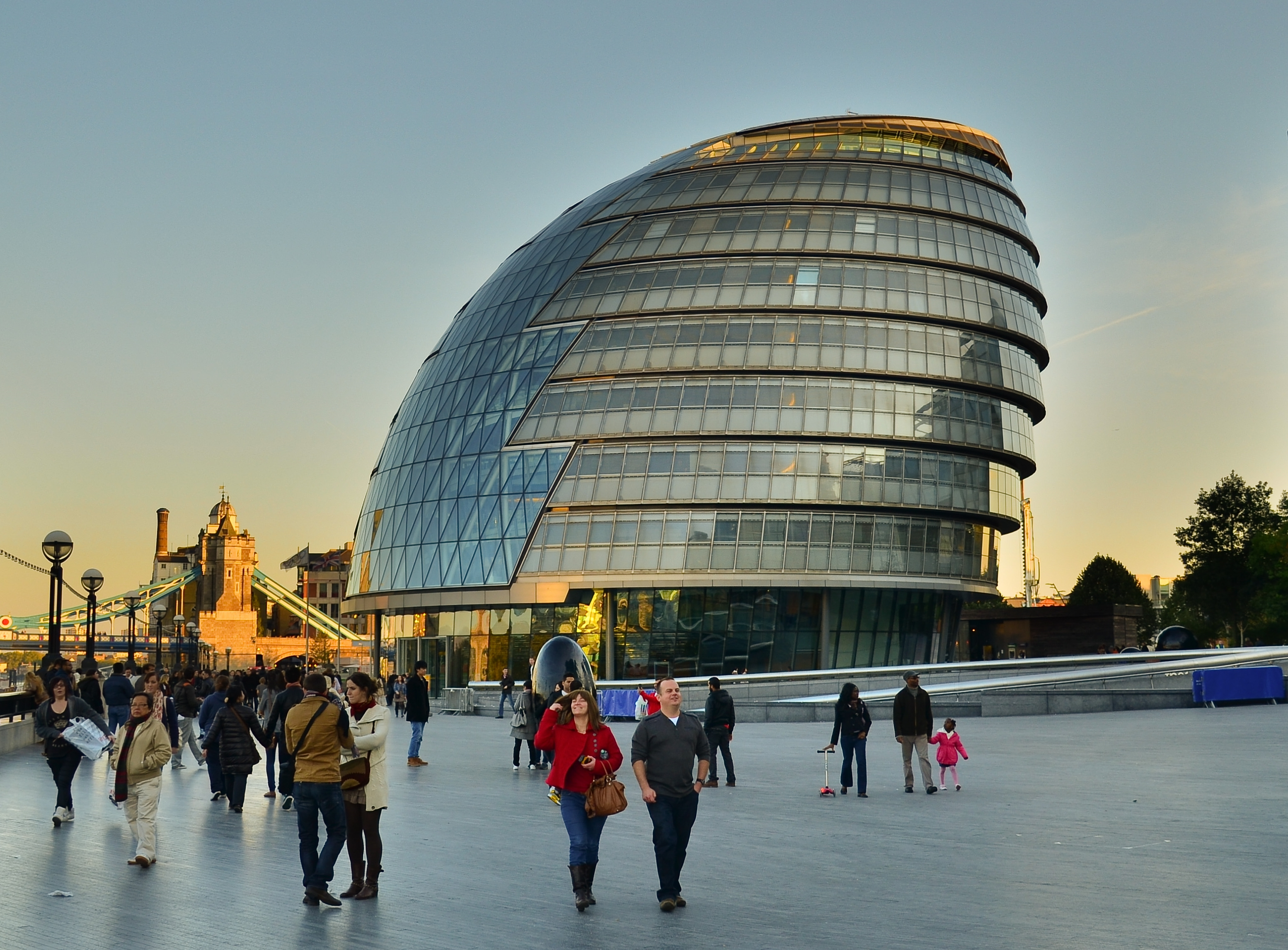
London's City Hall, near Tower Bridge, where most couples celebrated their relationships by signing the London Partnership Register.

The London Partnership Register was launched on 5 September 2001 by Ken Livingstone, then Mayor of London, working with Angela Mason, his advisor on LGBT issues and at the time director of Stonewall. Setting up a same-sex registration scheme had been suggested by gay Green Party Assembly Member Darren Johnson during the first Mayor's Question Time in 2000. The new scheme was announced shortly before Mardi Gras 2001, London's LGBT pride celebrations.

Both same-sex and opposite-sex couples were eligible to register, as long as at least one partner was a resident of Greater London. For the first year, partnerships were registered at the Greater London Authority (GLA) headquarters in Westminster, and moved one year later to its new building in City Hall on the South Bank of the River Thames near Tower Bridge on 5 September 2002. Couples could have up to 25 guests attend a brief ceremony, and received a certificate confirming registration. The register was funded by an £85 fee. For confidentiality, the register was not made publicly available.

Like similar schemes in many US cities, the register did not confer legal recognition equivalent to marriage, but it was hoped that courts might voluntarily accept registration as evidence in disputes involving tenancy, immigration, or pensions. For the launch, Livingstone wrote in the Pink Paper: "The London Partnerships Register is a step on the road to equality. I hope other cities will follow suit and that other organisations will accept it as proof of a relationship."

By late 2004, over 800 couples had signed the register, of which two-thirds were male–male couples, over a quarter were female–female couples and 3% were mixed-gender. The GLA did not keep records as to whether any registrants were transgender. Within the first 2 years of operation, 17 of the 602 registrants had separated and asked for their names to be removed from the register. (Note: By comparison, over 10,000 (mixed-gender) marriages ended in divorce within 3 years in 2003, with over 270,000 marriages registered that year.) Likewise, in the first year of operation 5 of the 314 partnerships had separated, a ratio almost identical to that of first-year divorce among mixed-gender couples.

Other British cities such as Brighton announced their intent to follow London's lead, with both Liverpool and Manchester setting up their own registers within two years of London. The London Partnership Register closed after the Civil Partnership Act 2004 was passed. By 15 December 2005, 998 couples had registered their commitment under the scheme. On 21 December 2005, actor Ian Burford and nursing manager Alex Cannell, the first couple to sign the register in 2001, were also among the hundreds of same-sex couples to register their civil partnerships on 21 December 2005, the first day that was possible in England and Wales.

== See also ==
- Civil Partnership Act 2004
- Legal status of same-sex marriage
- LGBT rights in the United Kingdom
  - Civil partnership in the United Kingdom
  - Same-sex marriage in the United Kingdom
