= Richard Savage (cricketer) =

English cricketer and teacher

- Born: Richard le Quesne Savage; 10 December 1955 (age 70); London, England
- Education: Marlborough College; Pembroke College, Oxford
- Occupations: Cricketer; Schoolteacher
- Political party: Green
- Spouse: Caroline Lucas (m. 1991)
- Children: 2
- Cricket career

Cricket information
- Batting: Right-hand
- Bowling: Right-arm off-break, medium pace

Domestic team information
- Years: Team
- 1976-1978: Oxford University Cricket Club
- 1976-1979: Warwickshire County Cricket Club

Career statistics
Competition	FC	LA
Matches	44	18
Runs scored	196	15
Batting average	7.25	7.50
100s/50s	-/-	-/-
Top score	22*	9*
Balls bowled	7427	954
Wickets	127	17
Bowling average	29.81	40.11
5 wickets in innings	6	-
10 wickets in match	1	-
Best bowling	7/50	3/19
Catches/stumpings	14/-	2/-
- Source: ESPNcricinfo, 20 June 2026

Richard Le Quesne Savage (born 10 December 1955) is an English teacher and former cricketer who occasionally played first-class and List A cricket between 1976 and 1979 for Oxford University and Warwickshire.

== Early life and education ==
Savage was born on 10 December 1955 in Waterloo, London. He was educated at Marlborough College and at Pembroke College, Oxford.

== Cricket career ==
Savage played cricket during his time as a pupil at Marlborough College. He took 50 wickets with right-arm medium-pace off-cutters and off-breaks for Warwickshire's second eleven in 1975 before going to Oxford University. He was in the Oxford University cricket team for three years, playing each season in The University Match and he also played in the Combined Universities team which competed in the Benson & Hedges Cup List A competition. In 1976, he played as well for the Oxford and Cambridge Universities side that took on the touring West Indies team. For Oxford against Sussex in 1976, he took six wickets for 66 in the first innings and six for 33 in the second to finish with 12 for 99, the best match figures of his career and the best figures by any bowler in a first-class match on the Pagham Cricket Club Ground.

In university holidays throughout his Oxford career, Savage turned out in occasional games for Warwickshire and in one of those, the 1977 game against Glamorgan, he took seven second innings wickets for 50 runs, the best innings performance of his career. Having left university in 1978, Savage had a single season as a full-time cricketer with Warwickshire in 1979, but was not successful, and left the first-class game. During his career, he once dismissed Viv Richards.

== Teaching career and personal life ==
Savage is a teacher of English at Ardingly College, and taught at comprehensive schools in Bristol and Oxford for fifteen years before teaching at international schools in Belgium and the UK. He is married to former Green Party MP Caroline Lucas; the couple have two adult sons.
