= Ashley Gunstock =

British Green Party activist and actor

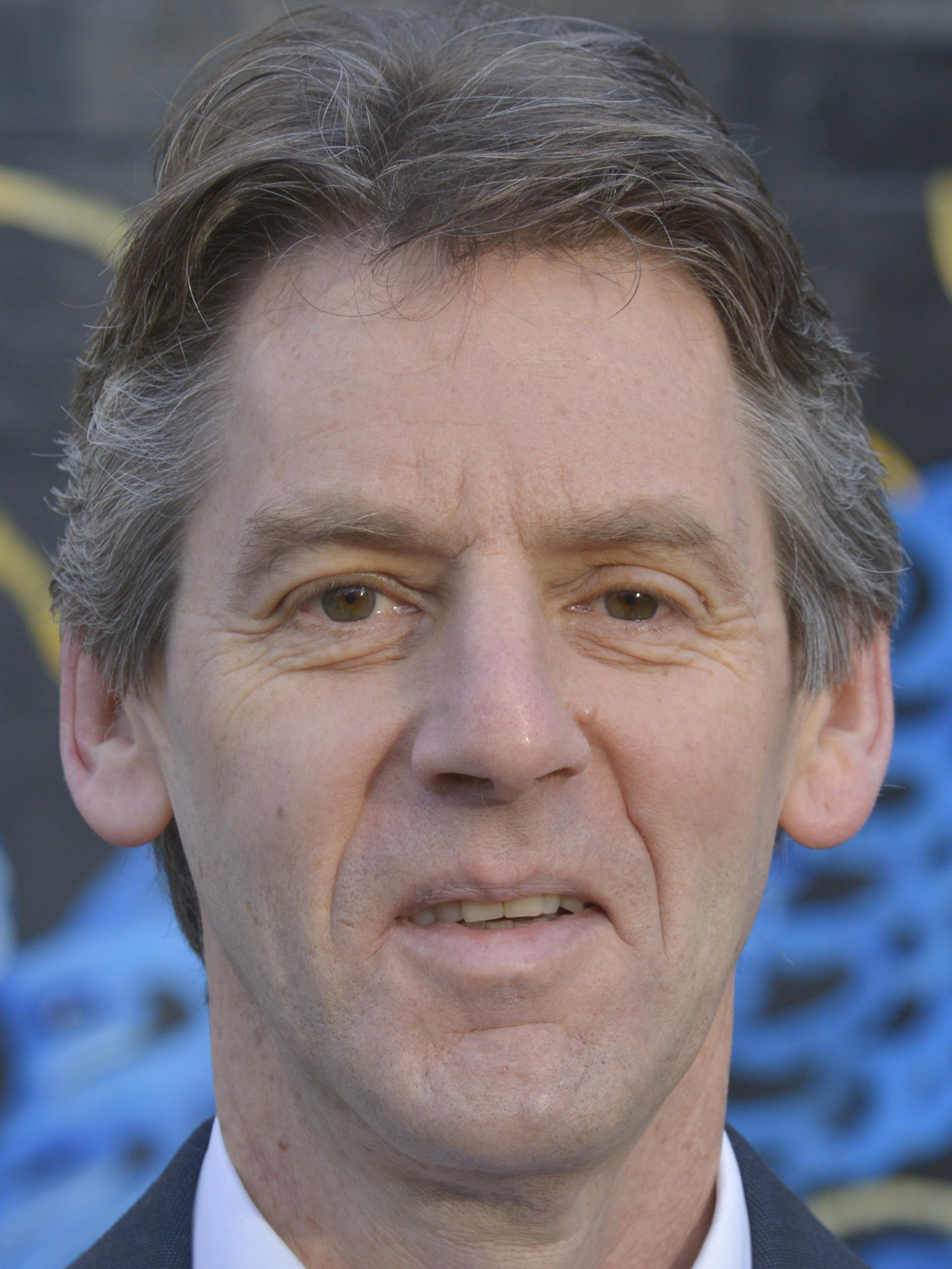

Personal details
- Born: 1956 or 1957 (age 69–70)
- Party: Green Party of England and Wales

Ashley Gunstock (born 1956 or 1957) was a British Green Party politician and actor. He unsuccessfully ran against Caroline Lucas to become the first leader of the Green Party in 2008 and was a candidate in the 2021 Green Party of England and Wales leadership election. He now teaches at Ilford County High School in Essex.

== Acting career ==
Gunstock played the role of Robin Frank in The Bill from 1984–1989. In 2016, he collaborated on a translation into English of the Dario Niccodemi play Scampolo. He played Shylock in his own adaptation of The Merchant of Venice in 2019.

== Political career ==
Gunstock is a member of the Green Party of England and Wales. He was previously a member of the UK Green Party before it separated, running for the party in the 1990 Barnet London Borough Council election. He ran for the successor party in every London Borough Council election until 2014. He stood as the Green parliamentary election candidate in Finchley in 1992, Finchley and Golders Green in 1997 and in Leyton and Wanstead for every election between 2001 and 2019.

He stood for the London Assembly for the Havering and Redbridge constituency in the 2000, 2004 and 2008 elections.

=== Leadership campaigns ===
In 2007 Gunstock stood to be the male Principal Speaker of the Green Party, a public spokesperson role the party had instead of leaders until 2008. He came in third place with 9.1% of the vote. He was a candidate in the 2008 Green Party of England and Wales leadership election. Caroline Lucas, the other candidate, was considered much better-known in the party. She won the election by 2,559 votes to Gunstock's 210.

On 17 August 2021, Gunstock announced he was running in the party's 2021 leadership election. He said that he wanted to get more Green Party candidates elected in order to address climate change.

== Elections contested ==
=== House of Commons ===
Date	Constituency	Votes	% votes	Place
1992	Finchley	564	1.4	4th
1997	Finchley and Golders Green	576	1.1	5th
2001	Leyton and Wanstead	1,030	3.1	4th
2005	Leyton and Wanstead	1,522	4.6	4th
2010	Leyton and Wanstead	562	1.4	5th
2015	Leyton and Wanstead	2,974	7.3	3rd
2017	Leyton and Wanstead	1,351	2.9	4th
2019	Leyton and Wanstead	1,805	4.1	4th

=== London Assembly (constituency) ===
Date	Constituency	Votes	% votes	Place
2000	Havering and Redbridge	6,803	6.2	5th
2004	Havering and Redbridge	6,009	4.7	6th
2008	Havering and Redbridge	9,126	5.4	5th

=== Council ===
Date	Council	Ward	Votes	Place
1990	Barnet London Borough Council	Childs Hill	267	10th
1994	Barnet London Borough Council	St Paul's	314	11th
1998	Barnet London Borough Council	Finchley	365	8th
2002	Redbridge London Borough Council	Snaresbrook	368	8th
2003 by-election	Redbridge London Borough Council	Valentines	86	5th
2006	Redbridge London Borough Council	Wanstead	810	7th
2009 by-election	Redbridge London Borough Council	Wanstead	256	4th
2010	Redbridge London Borough Council	Wanstead	810	7th
2014	Redbridge London Borough Council	Wanstead	484	10th

=== Green Party leadership ===
Date	Votes	% votes	Place
2008	210	7.6	2nd
2021	212	1.8	5th
