= Mike Woodin =

English politician (1965–2004)

Michael Edward Woodin
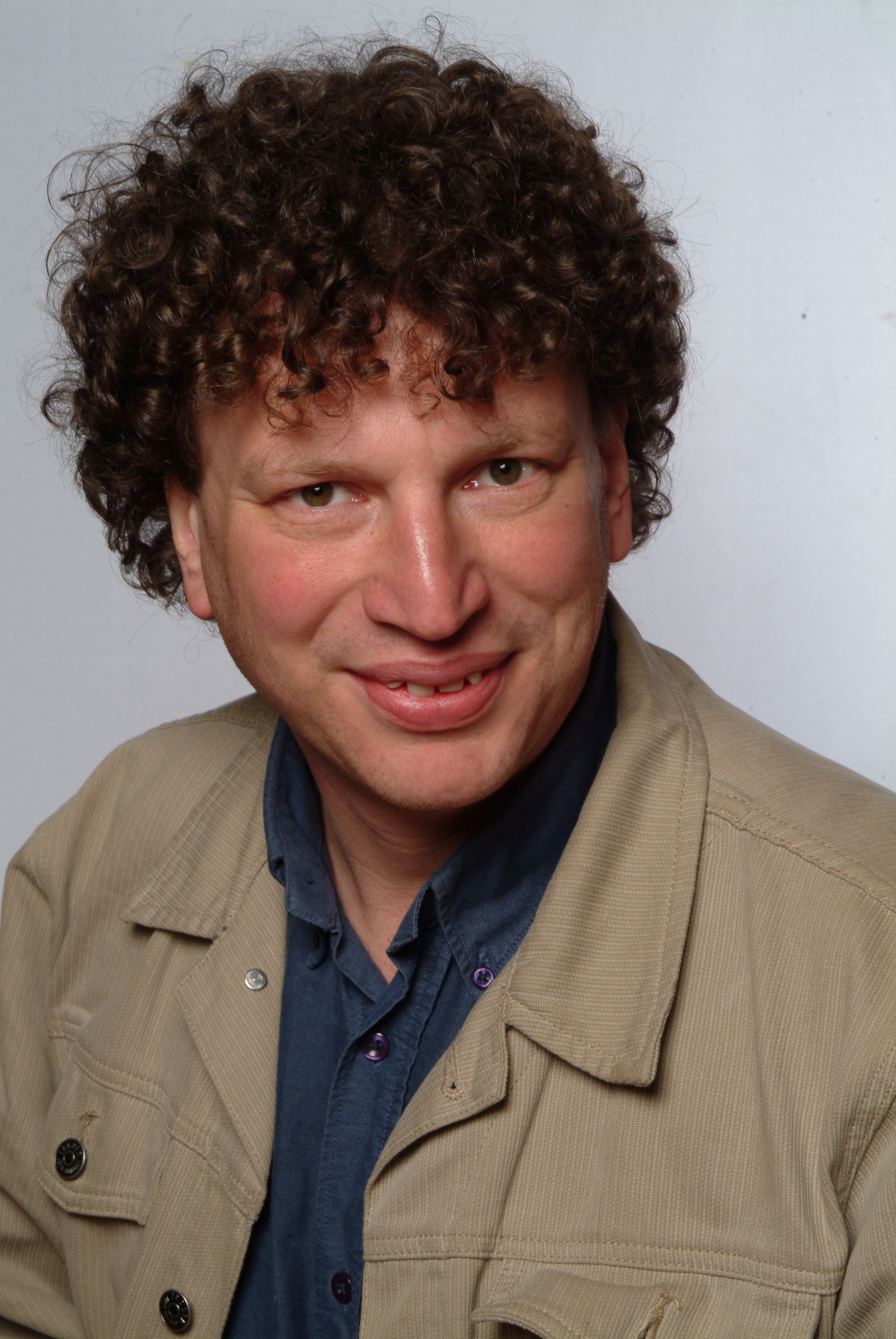

Principal Speaker of the Green Party
- In office 2003 – 9 July 2004 Serving with Caroline Lucas
- Preceded by: Darren Johnson
- Succeeded by: Keith Taylor
- In office 1997–2001 Serving with: Jean Lambert (1998–1999); Margaret Wright (1999–2001)
- Preceded by: David Taylor
- Succeeded by: Darren Johnson

Oxford City Councillor for Carfax Ward
- In office 9 June 1994 – 9 July 2004
- Succeeded by: Sushila Dhall

Personal details
- Born: 6 November 1965 Hartley, Kent, England
- Died: 9 July 2004 (aged 38) Oxford, England
- Resting place: Wolvercote Cemetery, Oxford
- Party: Green Party of England and Wales
- Education: Victoria University of Manchester; Wolfson College, Oxford

Michael Edward Woodin (6 November 1965 – 9 July 2004) was the Principal Speaker of the Green Party of England and Wales and a city councillor for Oxford from 1994 to 2004. He was Principal Speaker for six of the eight years between 1998 and 2004, firstly alongside Jean Lambert before her election as an MEP, then alongside Margaret Wright, and lastly with Caroline Lucas MEP.

He was educated at Gravesend Grammar School, Victoria University of Manchester, and Wolfson College, Oxford. He was lecturer in Psychology at Balliol College.

== Biography ==
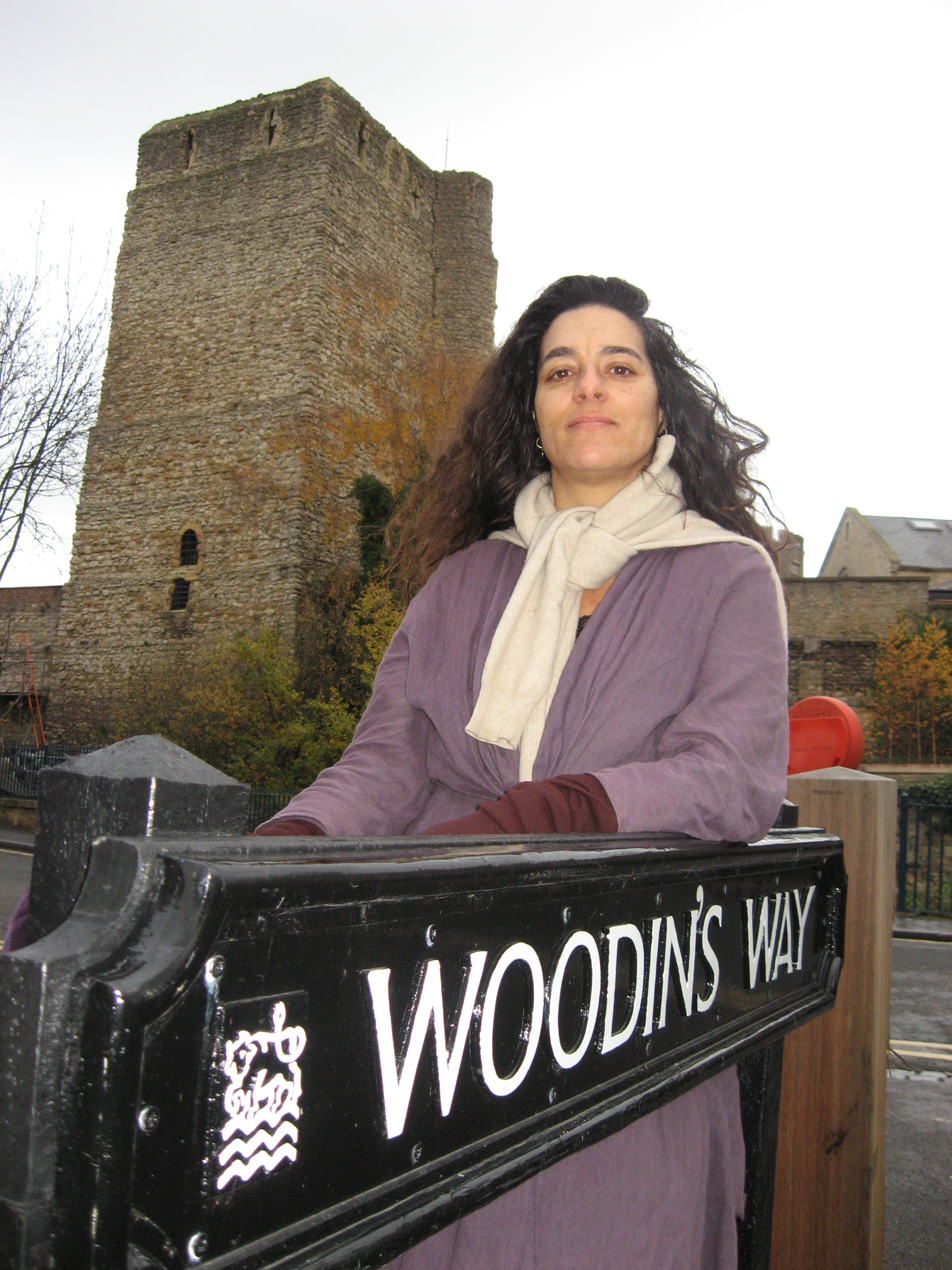
Cllr Sushila Dhall pictured in November 2007, in Woodin's Way near Oxford Castle, named after her friend the late councillor Mike Woodin.

Woodin was born in Hartley Kent to Shoshanna and Charles Woodin. His mother had come to England from Berlin, Germany on the Kindertransport and was adopted by a Christadelphian family in Norfolk. Therefore Woodin was raised as a Christadelphian but chose to return to his Jewish roots later on in life.

Woodin was one of the first Green Party city councillors elected in England and was Leader of the Green Party Group on Oxford City Council. He stood for the Green party in Oxford West and Abingdon in the 1992, 1997, and 2001 general elections. He was listed as Green Party's second candidate in South East England for the European Parliament elections in 1999 and 2004 after Caroline Lucas.

Woodin and Lucas co-authored the book Green Alternatives to Globalisation: A Manifesto, and a booklet against the single currency Euro: The Euro or a Sustainable Future for Britain?.

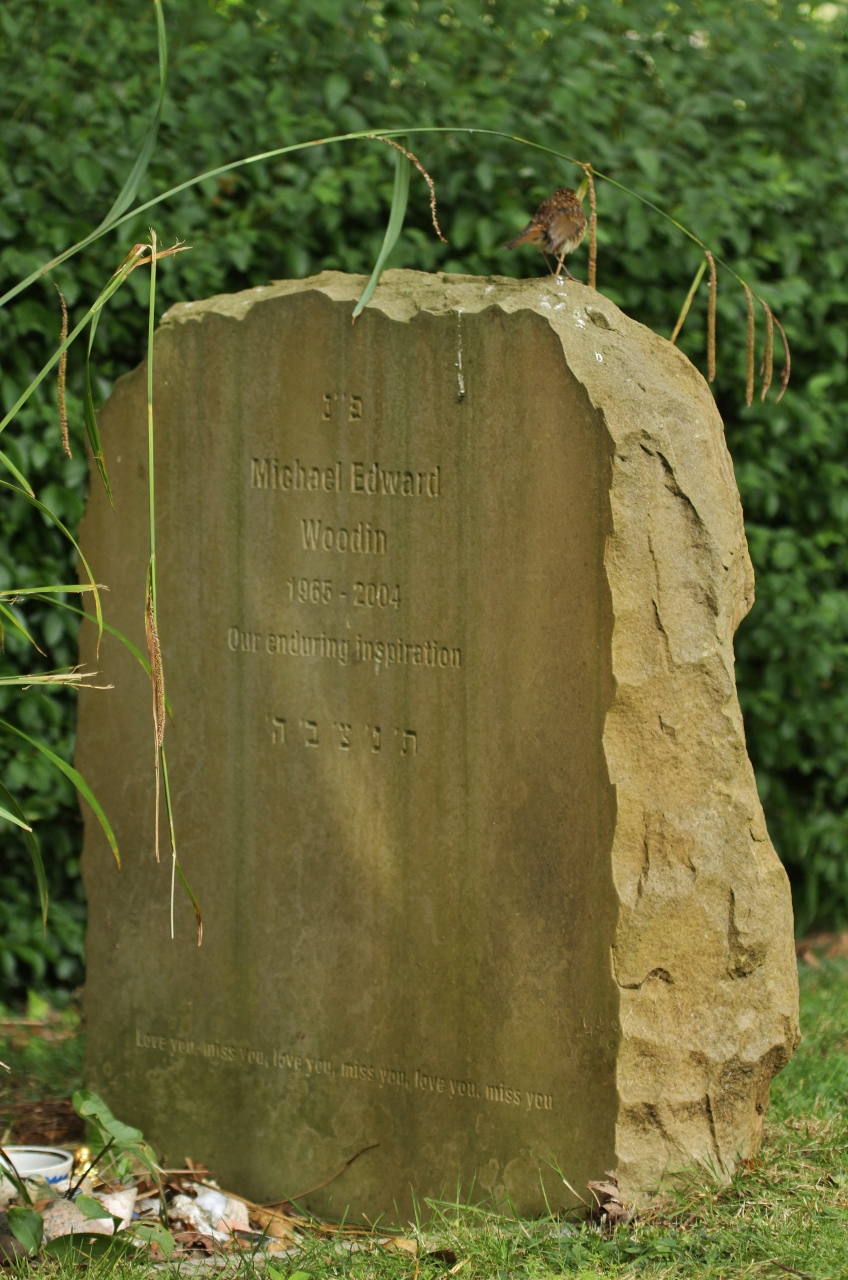
Mike Woodin's gravestone in Wolvercote Cemetery, with a juvenile robin perching on it

Woodin died in 2004 of secondary cancer of the lungs, despite being a lifelong non-smoker and keen observant of healthy living. At his funeral, his coffin was towed by bicycle through the streets of Oxford, in accordance with his wishes for the event to be car-free.

Political offices
Preceded by David Taylor	Principal Speaker of the Green Party of England and Wales; 1997–2001	Succeeded by Darren Johnson
Preceded by Darren Johnson	Principal Speaker of the Green Party of England and Wales; 2003–2004	Succeeded by Keith Taylor
