= Balvinder Saund =

British Sikh activist (born 1952)

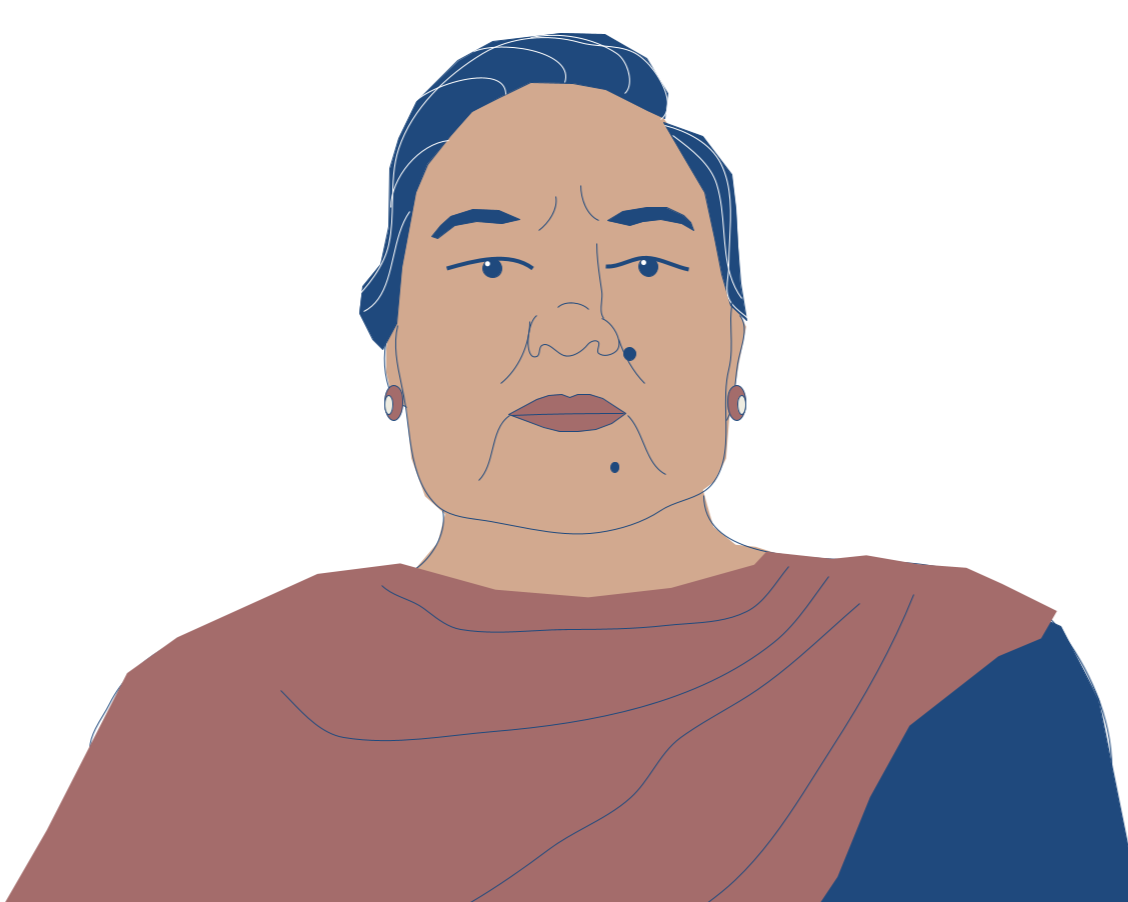
- Born: 1952 (age 73–74)
- Citizenship: United Kingdom
- Education: University of East London
- Occupations: Human rights activist Councillor
- Years active: 2001–present
- Organization: Sikh Women's Alliance
- Title: Member of Redbridge London Borough Council for Seven Kings
- Term: 2006–2013
- Political party: Labour (until 2012)
- Other political affiliations: Redbridge Independent Group (2012–2013)
- Awards: BBC 100 Women (2014)

Balvinder Kaur Saund (born c. 1952) is a British human rights activist and former politician. She has been the chair of the Sikh Women's Alliance since 2001, and has publicly called and campaigned for the rights of Sikh women in the United Kingdom. In 2014, she was named by the BBC as one of that year's 100 Women.

== Activism ==
Saund is a community activist in Ilford, a town in East London. Born into a Punjabi family, she is a member of the Gurdwara Singh Sabha London East.

In 2001, the Sikh Women's Alliance was founded in Ilford by a group of Sikh men, though shortly afterwards, its leadership was transferred to Saund and four other women, with Saund serving as the organisation's chair. Through the SWA, Saund has campaigned for greater awareness of issues including domestic abuse, honour-based violence and female infanticide within the Sikh community. She has called for a return to the gender equality espoused by Guru Nanak, the founder of Sikhism, and has said that the role and status of women in the religion has been negatively impacted by misogyny. Saund has cited evidence of this in the preference within Sikh families for sons over daughters, such as through holding paaths for the births of boys but not for girls, and asking granthis to pray for sons and grandsons, and not for daughters and granddaughters. Saund has called for more significant leadership roles for Sikh women beyond traditionally running langars, community kitchens in gurdwaras.

Saund has stated that honour-based violence is linked to men wanting "control and subservience" from women, and has described it as "old ways of thinking [that] should be left behind". Following the emergence of the #MeToo movement, Saund called for more safeguarding measures to be put in place for girls and women in gurdwaras.

== Political career ==
Saund was formerly a member of the Labour Party, and served as a councillor for the Seven Kings ward on Redbridge London Borough Council between 2006 and 2013. In May 2013, Saund, alongside fellow Labour councillors Filly Maravala and Virendra Tewari, publicly destroyed their Labour membership cards on the steps of Redbridge Town Hall in response to a change of the borough's local Labour leadership, which had deselected several long-serving candidates, including Tewari. The group established the Redbridge Independent Group, with Saund acting as its deputy leader until her retirement in 2014.

Saund ran as a candidate for the London Assembly in 2008, 2010 and 2012 for Havering and Redbridge, as well as a candidate on the Labour list, though was not elected.

== Recognition ==
In 2014, Saund was named as one of the BBC's 100 Women. Saund received an honorary degree from the University of East London.
