= Darren Johnson =

Former English Green Party politician

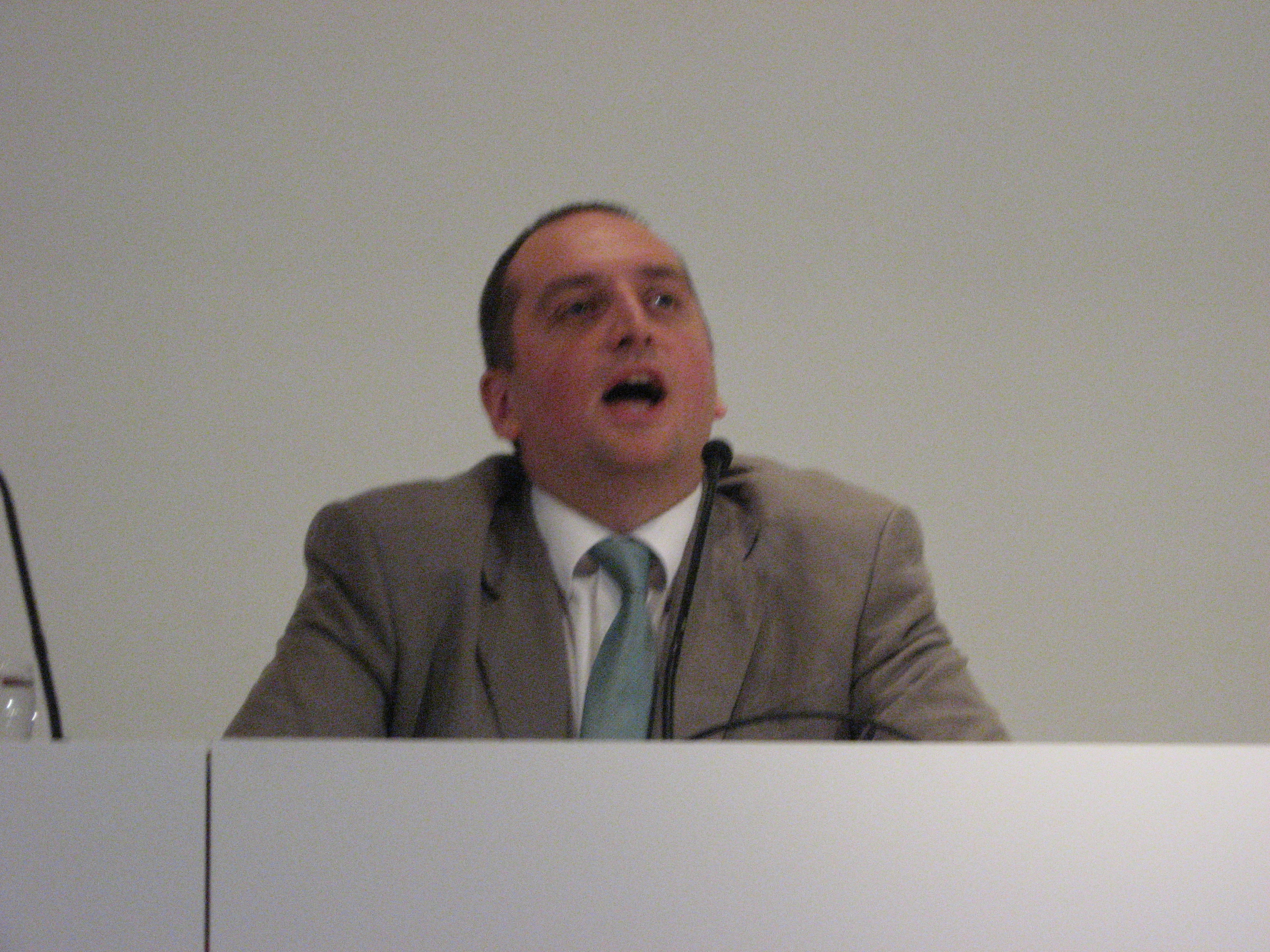
- Johnson in 2008

Principal Speaker of the Green Party
- In office 2001–2003
- Preceded by: Mike Woodin
- Succeeded by: Mike Woodin

Lewisham Borough Councillor for Brockley Ward
- In office 2 May 2002 – 22 May 2014

Member of the London Assembly as an additional member
- In office 4 May 2000 – 6 May 2016
- Preceded by: Assembly created
- Succeeded by: Siân Berry

Personal details
- Born: 1966 (age 59–60) Southport, Lancashire, England
- Party: Green Party of England and Wales (1987–2024); Labour (since 2026)
- Education: Goldsmiths, University of London

Darren Johnson's voice
recorded February 2013

Darren Paul Johnson (born 20 May 1966) is an English former politician who was a prominent member of the Green Party of England and Wales. He represented the Green Party on the London Assembly from 2000 to 2016 and was a Green councillor in the London Borough of Lewisham. He is now a writer and has had several rock music biographies published, and has since renounced his support of the Green Party.

== Early life and career ==
Johnson was born in Southport, Lancashire, and at school, studied A-Levels in English, Theatre Studies and Journalistic Studies. Johnson admitted to his "shame" that his first foray into politics was standing in a school mock election in 1979 as a Conservative Party candidate.

He lived in Hull for three years before moving with a friend to Wembley in London in 1990. He also lived in Finsbury Park and Golders Green before settling in Lewisham. His first job in London was "in accounts with an advertising firm in Goodge Street". He took a degree at Goldsmiths College (part of the University of London) in 1994, eventually gaining a first-class BA (hons.) degree in Politics and Economics. He apparently "started to work on his PhD until the London Assembly distracted him". He was also once a "paid consultant to Friends of the Earth".

== Political career ==
Johnson joined the Green Party in 1987 at the age of 20 "after the Chernobyl Disaster", which "had a big impact" on him. He was Male Principal Speaker of the party in 2002.

According to the Knitting Circle (a website with "resources on lesbian and gay issues"), his campaigning experience includes infiltrating "the military base at Aldershot dressed as Ivan the Terrible during an arms fair. He was saluted by the guards as he drove through the gates in a large limousine with tinted windows. He tried to buy arms with Monopoly money".

=== London Assembly member ===
In 2000, Johnson was elected to the inaugural London Assembly as part of a three-strong Green Group, including Jenny Jones AM and Victor Anderson (who resigned in March 2003 and was replaced by Noel Lynch for the remainder of the term). The 2004 elections would see the Greens lose the seat held by Lynch, leaving Johnson and Jones as the two remaining members of the Green Group. Both won re-election in the 2008 election, when the Greens held on to their two seats. He served as Deputy Chair of the Assembly 2008–09 and again in 2012–13 and was elected Chair of the Assembly in May 2009 and again in 2013.

As a London Assembly Member, Johnson was Chair of the Housing Committee and a member of the Business Management and Administration Committee, Budget and Performance Committee and the London Fire and Emergency Planning Authority (LFEPA). Johnson issued a report on the sustainability measures involved in planning for London's hosting of the Olympics in 2012, and also chaired an inquiry on nuclear waste trains for the London Assembly. He was previously Chair of the Environment Committee (between 2004/9 and 2010/11). The committee produced a number of reports, including investigations into the loss of street trees, and the effects of paving over front gardens in the city. He also proposed a same-sex partnership registration scheme for London during the first Mayor's Question Time in 2000, which was later established in 2001 by Mayor Ken Livingstone as the London Partnership Register. Along with his long-standing colleague Jenny Jones, he stood down at the 2016 election.

=== Lewisham councillor ===
In the 2002 local elections, Johnson was elected as a councillor for the Brockley ward in the London Borough of Lewisham, the Greens' first councillor in Lewisham, polling 1026 votes and coming top in the ward. He was re-elected in 2006, when the Greens gained a further five seats in Lewisham. He came top of the ward again, polling 1583 votes. In 2010, he was the only Green councillor in Lewisham to be re-elected and served until 2014 when he did not seek re-election.

In his time as a councillor, Johnson was successful in getting the council to adopt a Fair Trade policy. He opposed the closure of Ladywell Leisure Centre and put forward alternative sites for a new school. He also successfully campaigned for a new pedestrian crossing on Brockley Road, secured improvements to the traffic calming scheme and managed to halt evictions at St Norberts Allotments. In addition, he served as a member of Lewisham 's Housing Select Committee, Sustainable Development Select Committee, Council Urgency Committee, Elections Committee, Licensing (Supplementary) Committee, Licensing Committee, Overview and Scrutiny Committee and Marsha Phoenix Memorial Trust. He has represented Lewisham on the Local Government Association General Assembly.

=== Mayoral candidate ===
Johnson was the Green Party's candidate for Mayor of London in 2000 and 2004. In the 2000 election, he won 2.2% of first preference votes (38,121 votes), taking sixth place. He also came third in unallocated second preference votes with 192,764-second preferences (13.6%). In the 2004 election, he received 57,331 votes in the first round (2.9%) taking seventh place, and took 10.9% of unallocated second preferences (208,686).

Johnson chose not to seek selection as mayoral candidate for a third time. On 12 March 2007, the London Green Party voted to select Siân Berry as their mayoral candidate in the 2008 mayoral election, replacing Johnson. The winner in this election was Boris Johnson.

=== Parliamentary candidate ===
Having fought Brent South in 1992, Johnson was the Green Party's parliamentary candidate in the Lewisham Deptford constituency in 2001, 2005 and 2010. He came fourth in the constituency in the 2001 general election, polling 1,901 votes (6.5%). In the 2005 general election, Johnson, backed by the Fire Brigades Union (after being the only London Assembly member to vote against cuts in the brigade), received 11.1% of the votes (3,367 votes), coming fourth. In the 2010 general election he came fourth again, but his vote slipped back to 2,772 (6.7%).

=== Suspension by the Green Party ===
On 28 May 2024, Johnson revealed he had been suspended by the Green Party, following social media posts criticising the Green Party's response to the Cass Review. In December 2024 he resigned from the Green Party after 37 years' membership.

On 3 March 2026, Johnson announced on X he had joined the Labour Party, citing that "As an environmentalist and left-leaning social democrat, my views are now far closer to Labour than the increasingly radicalised Greens".

== Personal life and writing ==
Johnson, who is gay, lives in St Leonards, East Sussex. Johnson is a keen supporter of live music (rock and folk) and writes a live review blog. His book The Sweet in the 1970s was published by Sonicbond Publishing on 30 July 2021. This was followed by a second book Suzi Quatro in the 1970s published by the same publisher in July 2022; and a third book Slade in the 1970s published in May 2023. His fourth book Steeleye Span 1970 to 1989 On Track: Every Album, Every Song was published in August 2025, also by Sonicbond.

Political offices
Preceded by Mike Woodin	Principal Speaker of the Green Party of England and Wales; 2001–2003	Succeeded by Mike Woodin
