= Workers Party of Britain election results =

UK political party election results

This article lists the election results of the Workers Party of Britain in UK parliamentary elections and devolved and local elections.

== Elections ==
=== Senedd elections ===
Year	Votes	%	Seats	Misc.
2021	411	0.04%	0/60	Contested South Wales Central (0.2%)

=== Scottish Parliament elections ===
Year	Votes	%	Seats	Misc.
2021	23,299	0.9%	0/129	As part of All for Unity, contested all regional ballots

=== UK parliamentary elections ===
Year	Votes	Candidate	%	Seat	Finish
2021 by-election	8,264	George Galloway	21.9%	Batley and Spen	3rd
2024 by-election	12,335	George Galloway	39.7%	Rochdale	1st
2024 general election	11,587	George Galloway	29.2%	Rochdale	2nd
2025 by-election	164	Peter Ford	0.5%	Runcorn and Helsby	9th

==== 2024 election by constituency ====
Constituency	Region	Winning party in 2019	Winning party in 2024	Candidate	Votes	%	Position	Margin with winner
Bedford	East of England	Labour	Labour	Prince Sadiq Chaudhury	996	2.5%	7th	42.7%
Chelmsford	East of England	Conservative	Liberal Democrats	Mark Kenlen	105	0.2	8th	39.7%
Peterborough	East of England	Conservative	Labour	Amjad Hussain	5,051	12.1%	4th	19.9%
Watford	East of England	Conservative	Labour	Khalid Chohan	2,695	6.0%	5th	29.3%
Broxtowe	East Midlands	Conservative	Labour	Syed Maqsood	388	0.8%	7th	40.1%
Derby South	East Midlands	Labour	Labour	Chris Williamson	5,205	13.9%	3rd	24.9%
Lincoln	East Midlands	Conservative	Labour	Linda Richardson	479	1.1%	6th	42.7%
Mid Derbyshire	East Midlands	Conservative	Labour	Josiah Uche	150	0.3%	7th	36.2%
Northampton North	East Midlands	Conservative	Labour	Khalid Razzaq	1,531	3.7%	6th	39.8%
Nottingham East	East Midlands	Labour	Labour	Issan Ghazni	2,465	6.8%	5th	46.8%
Nottingham South	East Midlands	Labour	Labour	Paras Ghazni	1,496	4.6%	6th	42.8%
South Northamptonshire	East Midlands	Conservative	Conservative	Mick Stott	246	0.5%	7th	35.2%
Barking	Greater London	Labour	Labour	Muhammad Asim	3,578	9.8%	5th	34.7%
Battersea	Greater London	Labour	Labour	Dan Smith	499	1.1%	6th	47.7%
Brent East	Greater London	Labour	Labour	James Mutimer	1,052	2.8%	7th	48.4%
Brent West	Greater London	Labour	Labour	Nadia Klok	2,774	6.7%	5th	35.0%
Brentford and Isleworth	Greater London	Labour	Labour	Nisar Malik	2,746	6.1%	6th	38.1%
Cities of London and Westminster	Greater London	Conservative	Labour	Hoz Shafiei	727	1.9%	6th	37.1%
Crawley	South East England	Labour	Labour	Linda Bamieh	2,407	5.3%	5th	32.9%
Ealing Central and Acton	Greater London	Labour	Labour	Nada Jarche	1,766	3.7%	6th	43.1%
Ealing North	Greater London	Labour	Labour	Sameh Habeeb	3,139	7.3%	5th	40.5%
Ealing Southall	Greater London	Labour	Labour	Darshan Azad	4,237	9.1%	4th	40.0%
Feltham and Heston	Greater London	Labour	Labour	Amrit Mann	2,201	5.7%	5th	35.8%
Hackney South and Shoreditch	Greater London	Labour	Labour	Shahed Hussain	1,007	2.4%	6th	56.9%
Hayes and Harlington	Greater London	Labour	Labour	Rizwana Karim	1,975	5.2%	5th	48.1%
Hendon	Greater London	Conservative	Labour	Imtiaz Palekar	1,518	3.7%	6th	34.7%
Kingston and Surbiton	Greater London	Liberal Democrats	Liberal Democrats	Ali Abdulla	395	0.8%	7th	50.3%
Leyton and Wanstead	Greater London	Labour	Labour	Mahtab Aziz	1,633	3.7%	7th	43.8%
Luton North	East of England	Labour	Labour	Waheed Akbar	3,914	10.1%	5th	27.8%
Luton South and South Bedfordshire	East of England	Labour	Labour	Yasin Rehman	3,110	8.1%	5th	27.3%
Mitcham and Morden	Greater London	Labour	Labour	Mehmood Jamshed	1,091	2.4%	6th	53.0%
Putney	Greater London	Labour	Labour	Heiko Khoo	433	1.0%	6th	48.0%
Romford	Greater London	Conservative	Conservative	Zhafaran Qayum	898	2.0%	6th	32.8%
Stratford and Bow	Greater London	Labour	Labour	Halima Khan	3,274	7.5%	3rd	36.6%
Tooting	Greater London	Labour	Labour	Tarik Hussein	807	1.5%	6th	53.8%
Queen's Park and Maida Vale	Greater London	Labour	Labour	Irakli Menabde	1,792	4.7%	6th	47.8%
Walthamstow	Greater London	Labour	Labour	Imran Arshad	1,535	3.4%	6th	56.0%
Wimbledon	Greater London	Conservative	Liberal Democrats	Aaron Mafi	341	0.6%	6th	44.5%
Hartlepool	North East England	Labour	Labour	Thomas Dudley	248	0.7%	7th	45.5%
Middlesbrough and Thornaby East	North East England	Labour	Labour	Mehmoona Ameen	2,007	5.8%	4th	41.4%
Newcastle upon Tyne East and Wallsend	North East England	Labour	Labour	Muhammed Ghori	430	1.0%	6th	49.1%
Newton Aycliffe and Spennymoor	North East England	Conservative	Labour	Minhajul Suhon	246	0.6%	7th	45.6%
North Durham	North East England	Labour	Labour	Chris Bradburn	928	2.2%	6th	37.6%
Ashton-under-Lyne	North West England	Labour	Labour	Aroma Hassan	2,835	8.0%	4th	35.9%
Blackburn	North West England	Labour	Independent	Craig Murray	7,105	18.3%	3rd	8.7%
Bolton North East	North West England	Conservative	Labour	Syeda Kazmi	1,463	3.4%	6th	33.9%
Bolton South and Walkden	North West England	Labour	Labour	Jack Khan	4,673	12.7%	3rd	28.2%
Bootle	North West England	Labour	Labour	Ian Smith	526	1.4%	6th	67.3%
Bury North	North West England	Conservative	Labour	Shafat Ali	1,917	4.2%	4th	38.9%
Cheadle	North West England	Conservative	Liberal Democrats	Tanya Manzoor	811	1.6%	6th	45.1%
Widnes and Halewood	North West England	Labour	Labour	Michael Murphy	415	1.1%	6th	60.5%
Gorton and Denton	North West England	Labour	Labour	Amir Burney	3,766	10.3%	4th	40.5%
Manchester Central	North West England	Labour	Labour	Parham Hashemi	1,888	4.8%	6th	46.0%
Manchester Rusholme	North West England	Labour	Labour	Mohhamed Bilal	3,660	12.6%	3rd	39.3%
Manchester Withington	North West England	Labour	Labour	Lizzie Greenwood	1,774	4.3%	6th	48.6%
Oldham East and Saddleworth	North West England	Labour	Labour	Shanaz Siddique	4,647	11.1%	4th	23.6%
Rochdale	North West England	Labour	Labour	George Galloway	11,587	29.2%	2nd	3.6%
Stalybridge and Hyde	North West England	Labour	Labour	Audel Shirin	1,227	3.3%	5th	40.5%
Stockport	North West England	Labour	Labour	Ayesha Khan	1,630	3.7%	6th	49.5%
Stretford and Urmston	North West England	Labour	Labour	Kalila Choudhury	4,461	9.7%	4th	39.5%
Worsley and Eccles	North West England	Labour	Labour	Nas Barghouti	466	1.1%	6th	46.6%
Wythenshawe and Sale East	North West England	Labour	Labour	John Barstow	714	1.8%	6th	50.8%
Dundee Central	Scotland	Scottish National	Scottish National	Raymond Mennie	192	0.5%	9th	39.5%
Dover and Deal	South East England	Conservative	Labour	Colin Tasker	98	0.2%	11th	39.4%
Oxford East	South East England	Labour	Labour	Zaid Marham	615	1.6%	7th	48.1%
Slough	South East England	Labour	Labour	Adnan Shabbir	1,105	2.6%	7th	31.3%
Wycombe	South East England	Conservative	Labour	Khalil Ahmed	3,344	7.5%	5th	28.4%
Bath	South West England	Liberal Democrats	Liberal Democrats	Matthew Alford	230	0.5%	7th	40.8%
Bridgwater	South West England	Conservative	Conservative	Gregory Tanner	168	0.4%	7th	30.2%
Gloucester	South West England	Conservative	Labour	Steve Gower	974	2.1%	6th	34.0%
North Somerset	South West England	Conservative	Labour	Suneil Basu	133	0.2%	6th	35.4%
Blaenau Gwent and Rhymney	Wales	Labour	Labour	Yas Iqbal	570	1.9%	7th	51.7%
Caerfyrddin	Wales	Plaid Cymru	Plaid Cymru	David Evans	216	0.5%	8th	33.5%
Ceredigion Preseli	Wales	Plaid Cymru	Plaid Cymru	Taghrid Al-Mawed	228	0.5%	7th	46.5%
Birmingham Hodge Hill and Solihull North	West Midlands	Labour	Labour	James Giles	9,089	26.6%	2nd	4.6%
Birmingham Yardley	West Midlands	Labour	Labour	Jody McIntyre	10,582	29.3%	2nd	1.9%
Burton and Uttoxeter	West Midlands	Conservative	Labour	Azmat Mir	2,056	4.5%	5th	31.1%
Coventry East	West Midlands	Labour	Labour	Paul Bedson	1,027	2.8%	6th	46.7%
Coventry South	West Midlands	Labour	Labour	Mohammed Syed	777	1.8%	6th	45.8
Dudley	West Midlands	Conservative	Labour	Aftab Hussein	671	1.7%	7th	32.4%
Nuneaton	West Midlands	Conservative	Labour	John Homer	967	2.3%	6th	34.6%
Redditch	West Midlands	Conservative	Labour	Mohammed Amin	765	1.8%	6th	33.1%
Smethwick	West Midlands	Labour	Labour	Nahim Rubani	2,449	7.0%	5th	41.0%
Sutton Coldfield	West Midlands	Conservative	Conservative	Wajad Butkey	653	1.4%	6th	36.9%
Wolverhampton South East	West Midlands	Labour	Labour	Athar Warraich	915	2.7%	5th	47.6%
Wolverhampton West	West Midlands	Conservative	Labour	Vikas Chopra	576	1.3%	8th	43.0%
Richmond and Northallerton	Yorkshire and the Humber	Conservative	Conservative	Louise Dickens	90	0.2%	11th	47.3%
Doncaster Central	Yorkshire and the Humber	Labour	Labour	Tosh McDonald	758	2.0%	6th	44.2%
Halifax	Yorkshire and the Humber	Labour	Labour	Shakir Saghir	2,543	6.3%	5th	28.8%

=== UK local elections ===
==== Local elections ====
The party won four councillors in the 2024 United Kingdom local elections.

==== Mayoral elections ====
Year	Votes	Candidate	%	Position	Finish
2024	2,378	John Hamilton	5.7%	Mayor of Lewisham	5th

==== Police and Crime Commissioner Elections ====
Year	Votes	Candidate	%	Position	Finish
2024	8,396	Waheed Akbar	8.3%	Bedfordshire Police and Crime Commissioner	4th

== See also ==
- Respect Party election results
