= 2007 London Labour Party mayoral selection =

London Labour Party mayoral selection 2007
- 3 May 2007
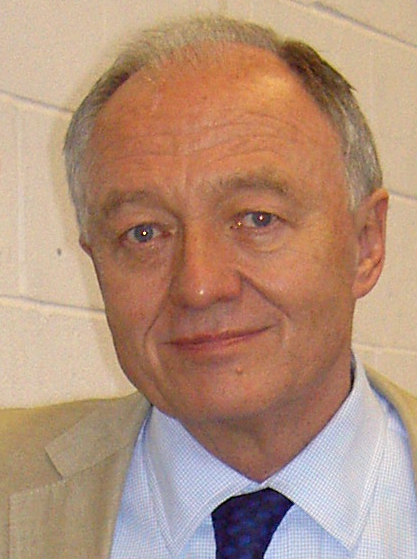
Candidate	Ken Livingstone
Popular vote	Unopposed
Elected Mayoral candidate
Ken Livingstone
Labour

The London Labour Party mayoral selection of 2007 was the process by which the Labour Party selected its candidate for Mayor of London, to stand in the 2008 mayoral election. Ken Livingstone, the incumbent Mayor of London, was selected to stand.

== Candidates ==
- Ken Livingstone, Mayor of London; Leader of the Greater London Council 1981–1986; Member of Parliament for Brent East 1987–2001.

== Result ==
On 3 May 2007 the Labour Party announced Ken Livingstone, the incumbent mayor, had been selected as their mayoral candidate. The announcement was made following consultations with London Labour Party members.

== See also ==
- 2008 London mayoral election
