= 2008 London mayoral election =

- 1 May 2008
- Opinion polls
- Registered: 2,456,990
- Turnout: 45.3% ▲8.38 pp
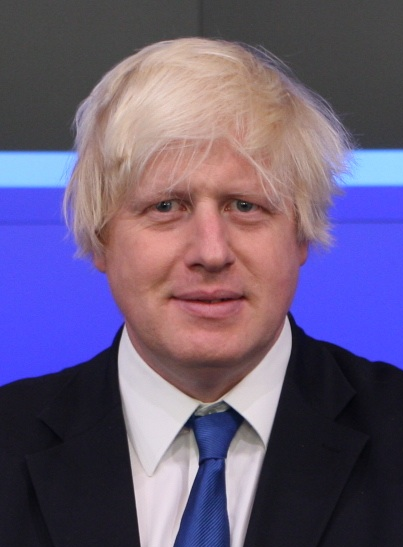

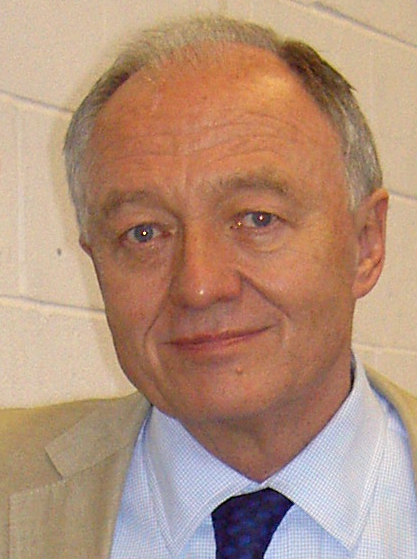

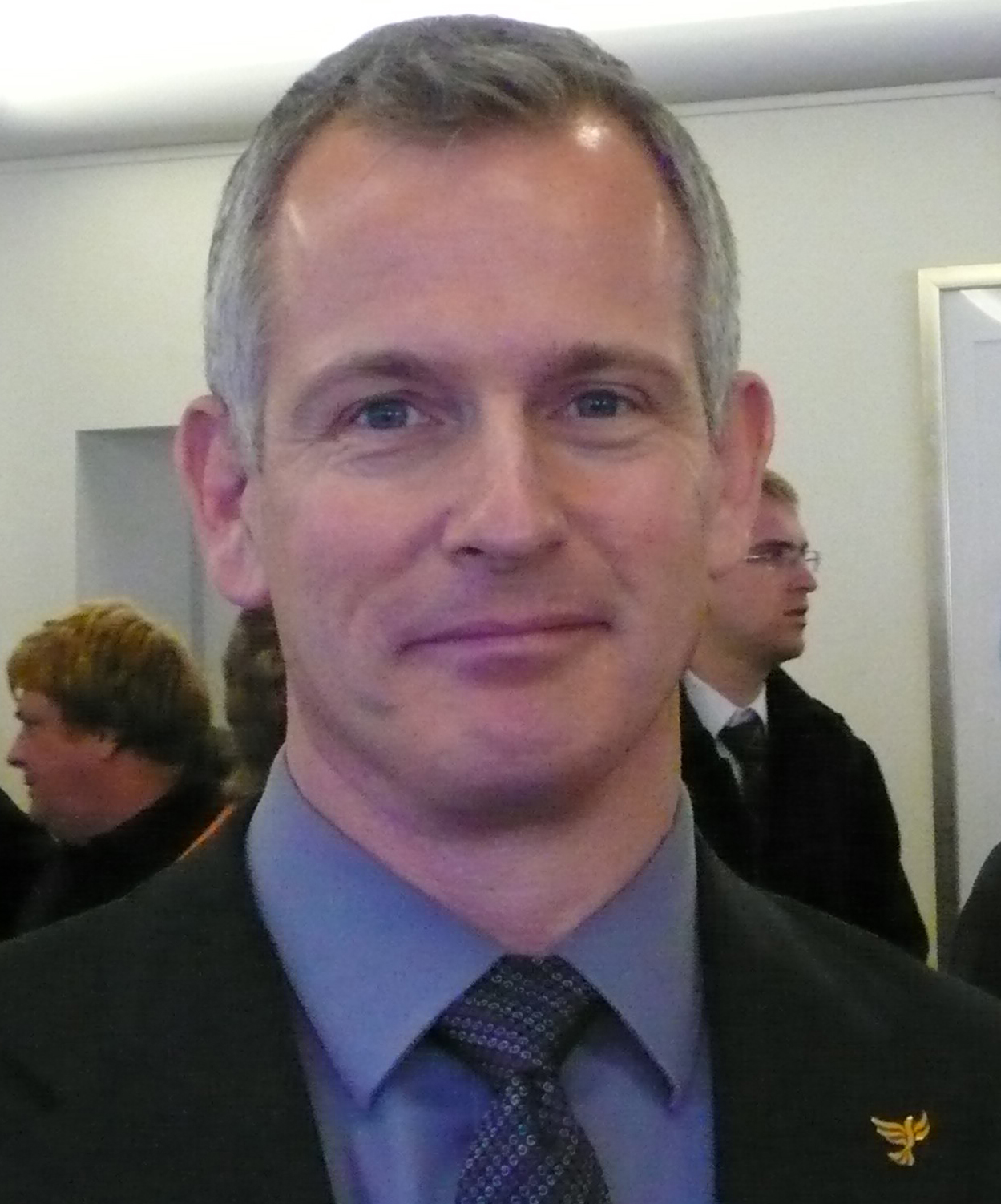
Candidate	Boris Johnson	Ken Livingstone	Brian Paddick
Party	Conservative	Labour	Liberal Democrats
First Round	1,043,761	893,887	235,585
Percentage	43.2%	37.0%	9.8%
Swing	▲14.0pp	Steady	▼5.6pp
Second Round	1,168,738	1,027,976	Eliminated
Percentage	53.2%	46.8%	Eliminated
Swing	▲8.6pp	▼8.6pp
- First preference votes by London borough. Blue boroughs are those with most first preference votes for Boris Johnson and red those for Ken Livingstone
Mayor before election
Ken Livingstone
Labour
Elected mayor
Boris Johnson
Conservative

The 2008 London mayoral election for the office of Mayor of London, England, was held on 1 May 2008. Conservative candidate Boris Johnson defeated incumbent Labour Mayor Ken Livingstone. It was the third London mayoral election, the previous elections being the first election in May 2000 and the second election in June 2004.

Johnson became the second Mayor of London and the first Conservative to hold the office since its creation in 2000. This became the first London Mayoral election in which the incumbent mayor was defeated by a challenger. The popular vote achieved by Johnson remained the largest polled by winning mayoral candidate until Labour candidate Sadiq Khan received 1,148,716 first-preference votes in 2016. The result was the first time that the Conservatives had won control of London-wide government since 1977.

== Candidate selection process ==
=== Conservative Party ===
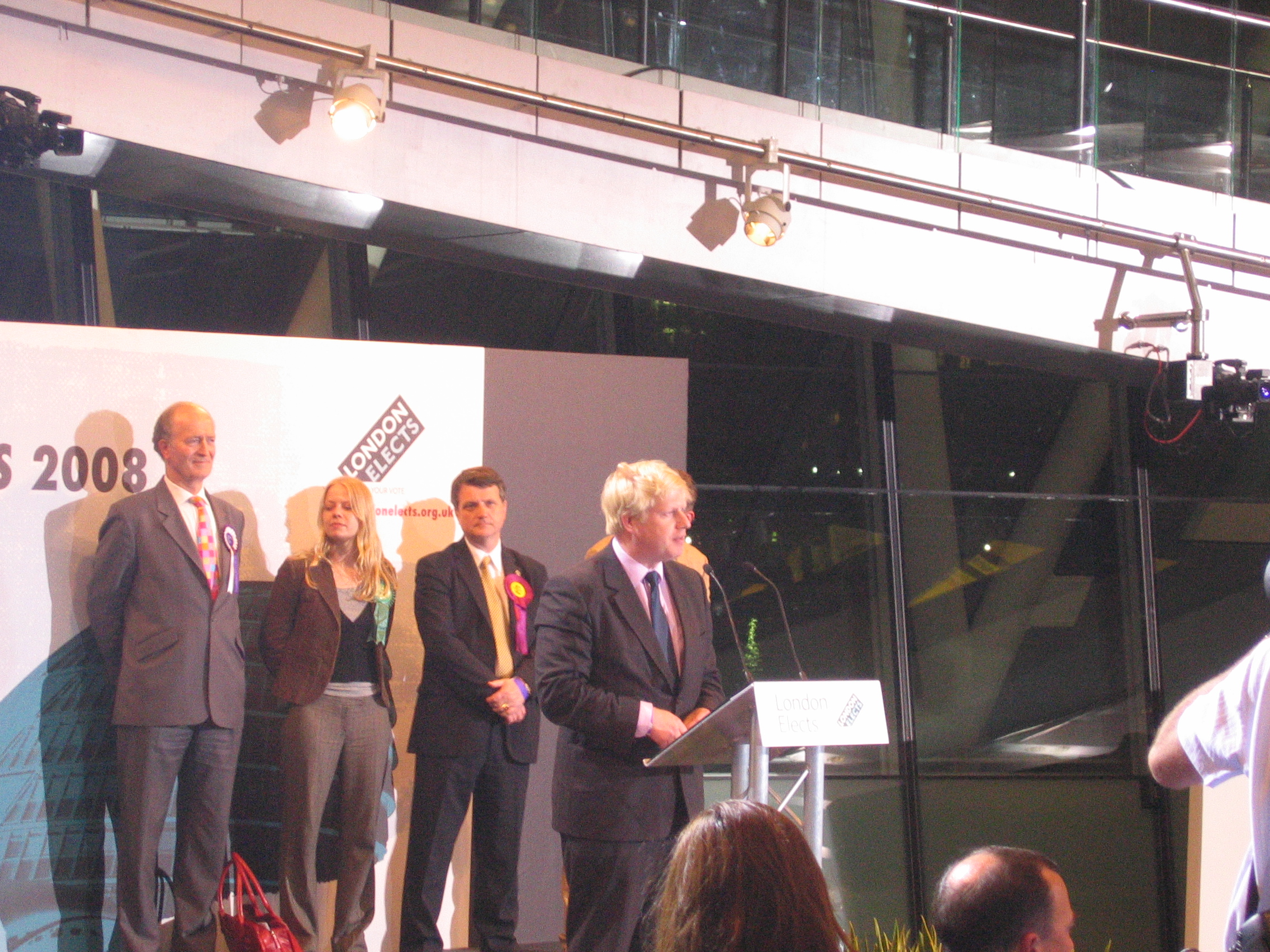
Boris Johnson, the Conservative candidate, giving his victory speech

The Conservative candidate was determined by a primary election open to the entire London electorate, originally scheduled for October 2006. Candidates who had applied by 4 August deadline included Richard Barnes, London Assembly member for Ealing and Hillingdon, who withdrew in July 2007 and threw his support behind Boris Johnson; Andrew Boff, former Hillingdon and Hackney London Borough Councillor; Nicholas Boles, Policy Exchange think-tank director, who withdrew in July 2007 for health reasons; Dr Robert Frew, a cultural policy and management specialist; Victoria Borwick, Kensington and Chelsea London Borough Councillor; Warwick Lightfoot, also a Kensington and Chelsea councillor; and Lee Rotherham. Steven Norris, Conservative mayoral candidate in 2000 and 2004, ruled himself out. Broadcaster Nick Ferrari also considered seeking the nomination but eventually decided against it.

By 4 August 2006 deadline, however, the process was delayed for six months to allow time for further candidates to submit applications. Prospective applicants who subsequently publicly declared were Lurline Champagnie, a London Borough of Harrow councillor; Winston McKenzie, a former boxer; and disc jockey Mike Read. Read withdrew in July 2007 following a change in the voting system for Conservative candidates, giving his support to Johnson.

In April 2007 the Conservative party confirmed it had approached former Director-General of the BBC Greg Dyke. Dyke stated he would not stand except on a joint ticket with the Liberal Democrats. The Liberal Democrats stated this would be against its party's constitution. Around this point former Conservative Prime Minister Sir John Major was considered a possible candidate, but he turned down an offer from David Cameron.

Following media and members' criticism over the party's selection procedure, the party chairman revised the timetable requiring a candidate to be in place before the party conference at the end of September 2007. In June 2007, the party scheduled the selection process to conclude on 27 September 2007.

On 16 July, shortly before the noon deadline for nominations, Boris Johnson confirmed he would seek the Conservative nomination. A final four of Johnson, Boff, Borwick and Lightfoot were chosen on 21 July for the primary election. On 27 September 2007, Johnson won 75% of the vote and, thus, the nomination.

=== Labour Party ===
On 3 May 2007, following consultations with London Labour Party members, the Labour Party selected Ken Livingstone, the incumbent mayor, as their mayoral candidate.

=== The Left List ===
Following a split in the Respect Party at the end of 2007, the George Galloway-led faction (also referred to as Respect Renewal) retained the rights to the use of the name in elections. The Socialist Workers Party-dominated faction put forward Lindsey German under the Left List banner. Galloway's faction did not put forward a candidate, though Galloway declared his support for Ken Livingstone.

=== English Democrats ===
In July 2007, the English Democrats nominated Talksport presenter Garry Bushell as a candidate in the 2008 election. In January 2008, Bushell stepped aside (due to work commitments) in favour of Fathers-4-Justice campaigner Matt O'Connor, who successfully stood against Andrew Constantine, a City of London Banker, in a selection contest. O'Connor was also their last London-wide list Assembly candidate. O'Connor withdrew on 25 April, after he fell out with the party over leadership, campaign funding and tactics.

=== Liberal Democrats ===
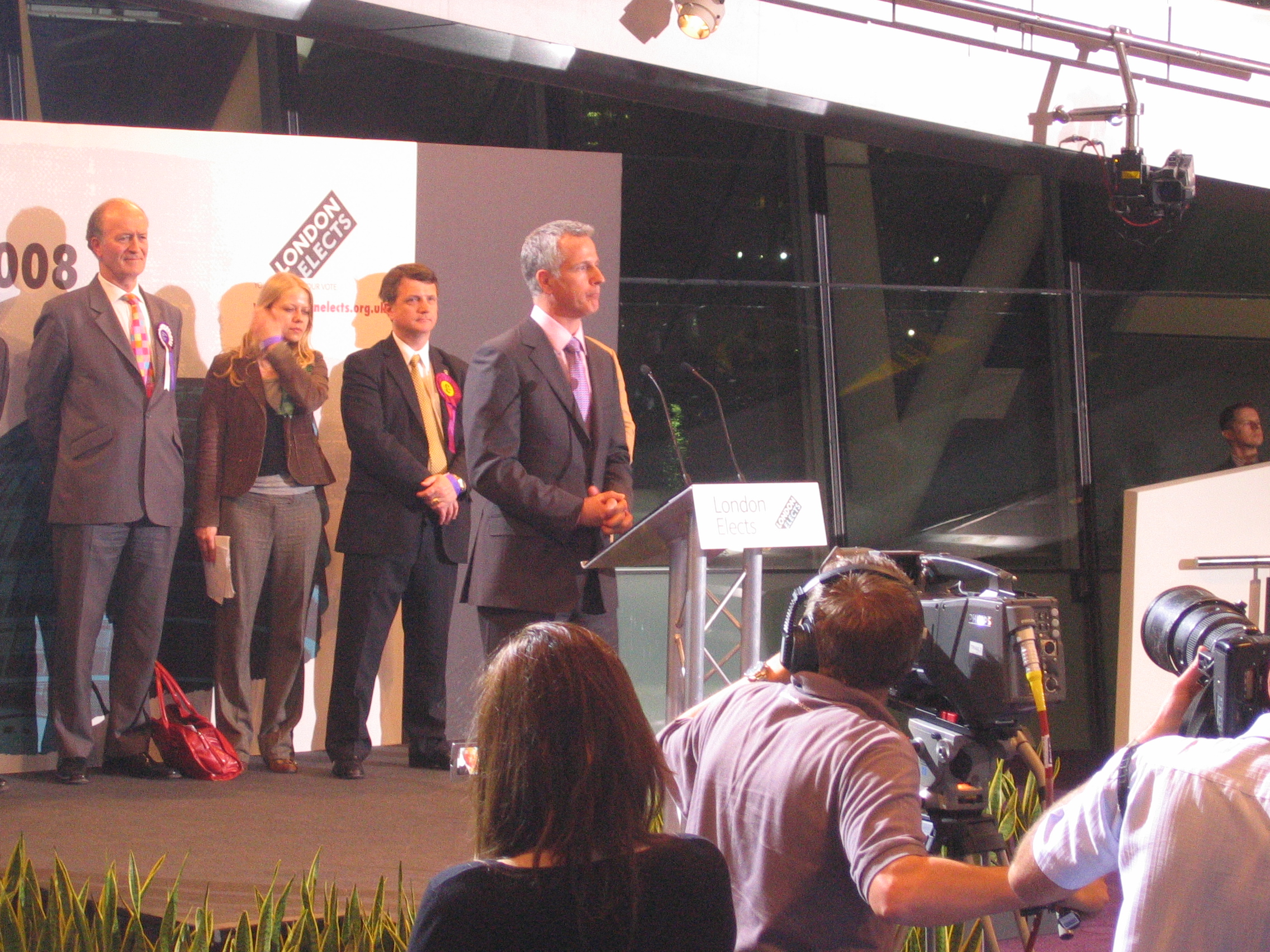
Brian Paddick, the Liberal Democrat candidate, speaking in City Hall after the results of the London mayoral election had been announced, 3 May 2008

The Liberal Democrats drew up a shortlist in September 2007 with a final choice made by a one member, one vote ballot of party members. Simon Hughes, the party's 2004 mayoral candidate, did not stand. The ballot was won by former police chief Brian Paddick. who defeated Chamali Fernando and Councillor Fiyaz Mughal.

=== British National Party ===
On 9 May 2007, the British National Party selected Richard Barnbrook, leader of the opposition on Barking & Dagenham Borough Council, and a member of the party's National Advisory Committee, to stand for election in 2008.

=== UK Independence Party ===
At the UK Independence Party (UKIP) 2007 party conference, Gerard Batten who was the UKIP MEP for the London region was selected to contest the London Mayoral Election.

In October 2006, UKIP talked of Talksport presenter James Whale standing against Ken Livingstone in the 2008 election. The government's media authority Ofcom told Whale that becoming Mayor would prevent him from continuing his radio show. Whale subsequently stated on his programme he would not be the UKIP candidate, but he did not rule out standing for election.

=== Green Party ===
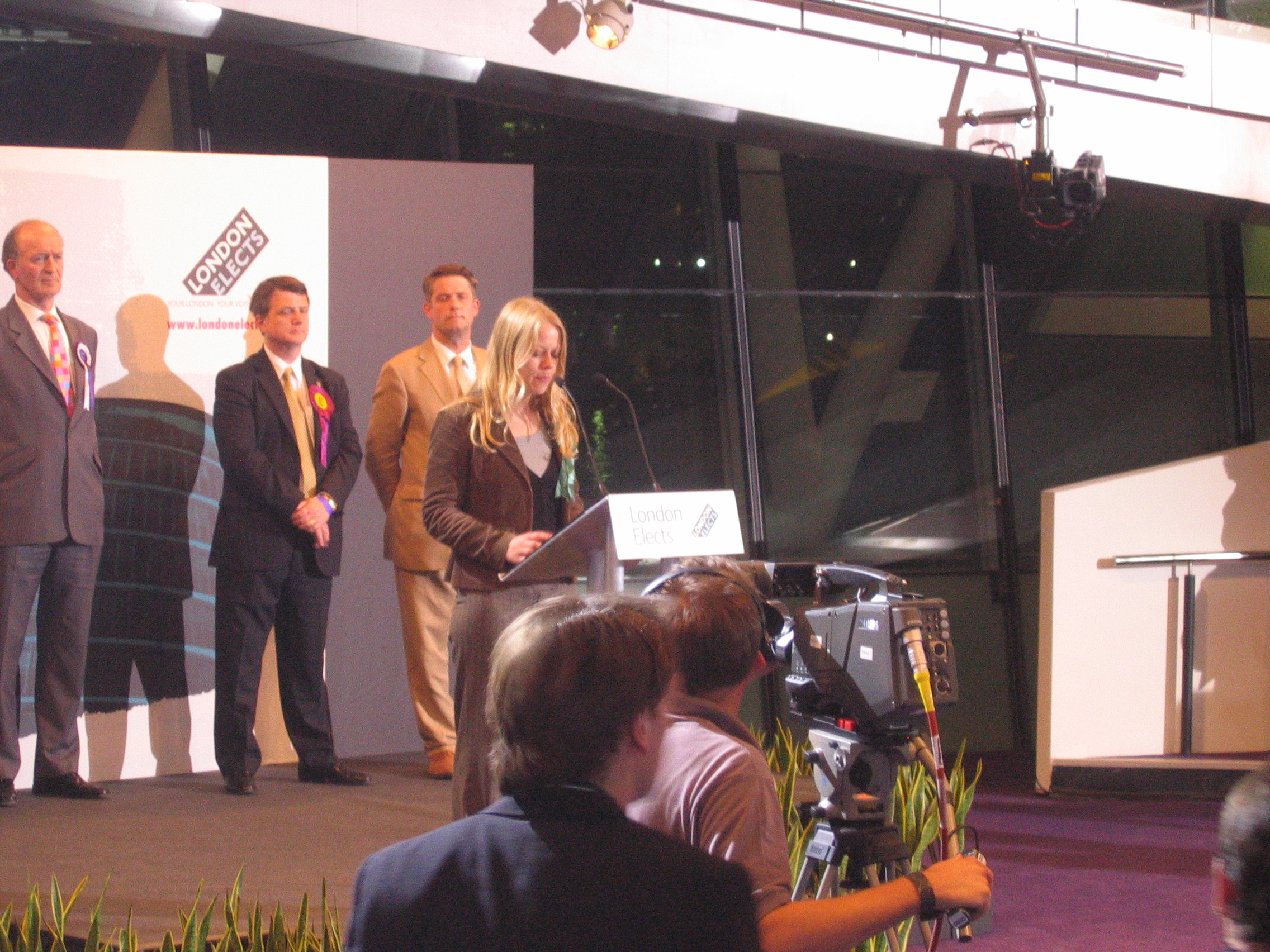
Siân Berry speaking at the London mayoral announcement

On 12 March 2007 the party selected Siân Berry as its mayoral candidate after a ballot of its London members, receiving 45% of the vote. The other candidates were Shahrar Ali, Shane Collins, Katie Dawson and Terry McGrenera. Berry was also one of their Assembly candidates.

=== Winston McKenzie ===
In December 2007 former boxer Winston McKenzie told the BBC that he intended to stand for Mayor of London as an independent on an anti-gang crime platform, having failed to secure the Conservative nomination earlier in the year.

=== Christian Choice ===
On 12 February Alan Craig was selected by the Christian Choice Party to stand in the Mayoral election. The Christian Choice Party are an alliance between the Christian Party and the Christian Peoples Alliance.

== Potential candidates who did not stand ==
There were a significant number of people who claimed that they were planning to stand, but did not submit valid nomination papers.

=== One London Party ===
The One London Party chose their leader, Damian Hockney, as candidate but on 27 March 2008 Hockney withdrew from the mayoral race. He blamed a lack of media opportunities for smaller parties such as his, and claimed the race was "a media election, fought just in the media".

=== Time Out ===
The London listings magazine Time Out planned to recruit a self-financing candidate to stand on a manifesto agreed by its readers. In February 2008 it confirmed that columnist Michael Hodges would be its candidate, standing on a reformist ticket. However, he decided not to stand, citing the bureaucratic legislative requirements for candidates and instead pledged to "fight on" to open the system up to ordinary Londoners to stand as independents.

=== John Bird ===
In March 2007 following widespread speculation that John Bird, founder of The Big Issue, would seek the Conservative nomination, he stated that he would stand as an independent, on a platform of "social inclusion". In October 2007, he withdrew from the race and instead promised to launch a new social movement around tackling poverty.

=== Others ===
Chris Prior planned to stand on a platform to abolish the congestion charge for the London Assembly but pulled out of the mayoral race shortly before the close of nominations.

On 21 February 2008 Dennis Delderfield was nominated by the New Britain Party. He said he would abolish the Mayoral office and the Greater London Authority (GLA). He did not submit a valid nomination.

John Flunder was to be the Senior Citizens Party candidate for Mayor of London but did not submit a valid nomination.

LondonElectsYou.co.uk, a social networking site aimed at selecting a member of the public to contest the election with a £50,000 campaign budget, was set up in March 2008. The winning candidate did not submit any nomination however, with the site's founder David Smuts claiming that electoral authorities' bureaucratic obstructions failed to get them the required access to the electoral register to validate their nomination.

In April 2007 Richard Fairbrass, the lead singer of pop band Right Said Fred, considered standing for Mayor of London on a platform of opposition to the London congestion charge. In December 2007 media reports that peace protester Brian Haw would stand for Mayor of London remained unsubstantiated.

== Voting system ==
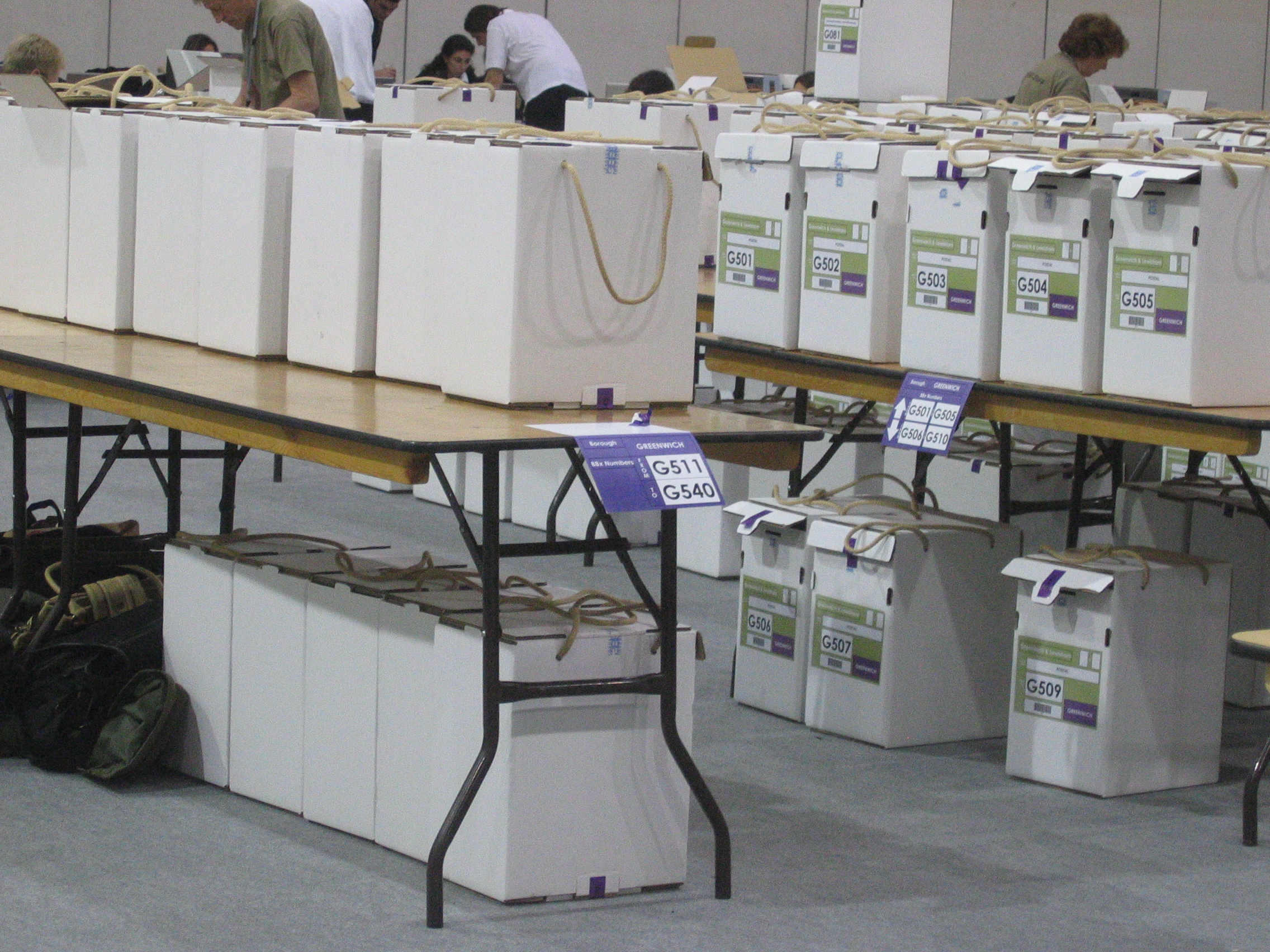
Ballot boxes at a count centre

The supplementary vote system is used for all mayoral elections in England and Wales. Under this system voters express a first preference and (optionally) a second preference. If no candidate is the first choice of a majority of voters (i.e. more than 50%), the top two candidates proceed to a second round. Voters whose first choice has been eliminated have their second preferences scrutinised, in order to determine which of the remaining candidates is favoured by a majority of all voters who have expressed a preference between the two. This gives a result whereby the winning candidate has the support of a majority of votes cast (at least by those who expressed a preference among the top two).

=== Second preference recommendations ===
Various parties recommended a variety of second preferences to their supporters. Labour and the Greens formed a second preference pact, urging Livingstone supporters to give their second choice vote to Berry and vice versa. Left List also encouraged their supporters to vote Livingstone second, while the BNP encouraged theirs to vote Johnson second, although Johnson stated during the campaign that he did not want the second choice votes of BNP supporters. Brian Paddick was regularly pressed through the campaign to recommend a second preference choice to Liberal Democrat voters, with Livingstone and the Labour Party keen to be chosen, but Paddick refused to make such a recommendation, revealing after the election that his second preference vote was for the Left List.

=== Vote counting ===
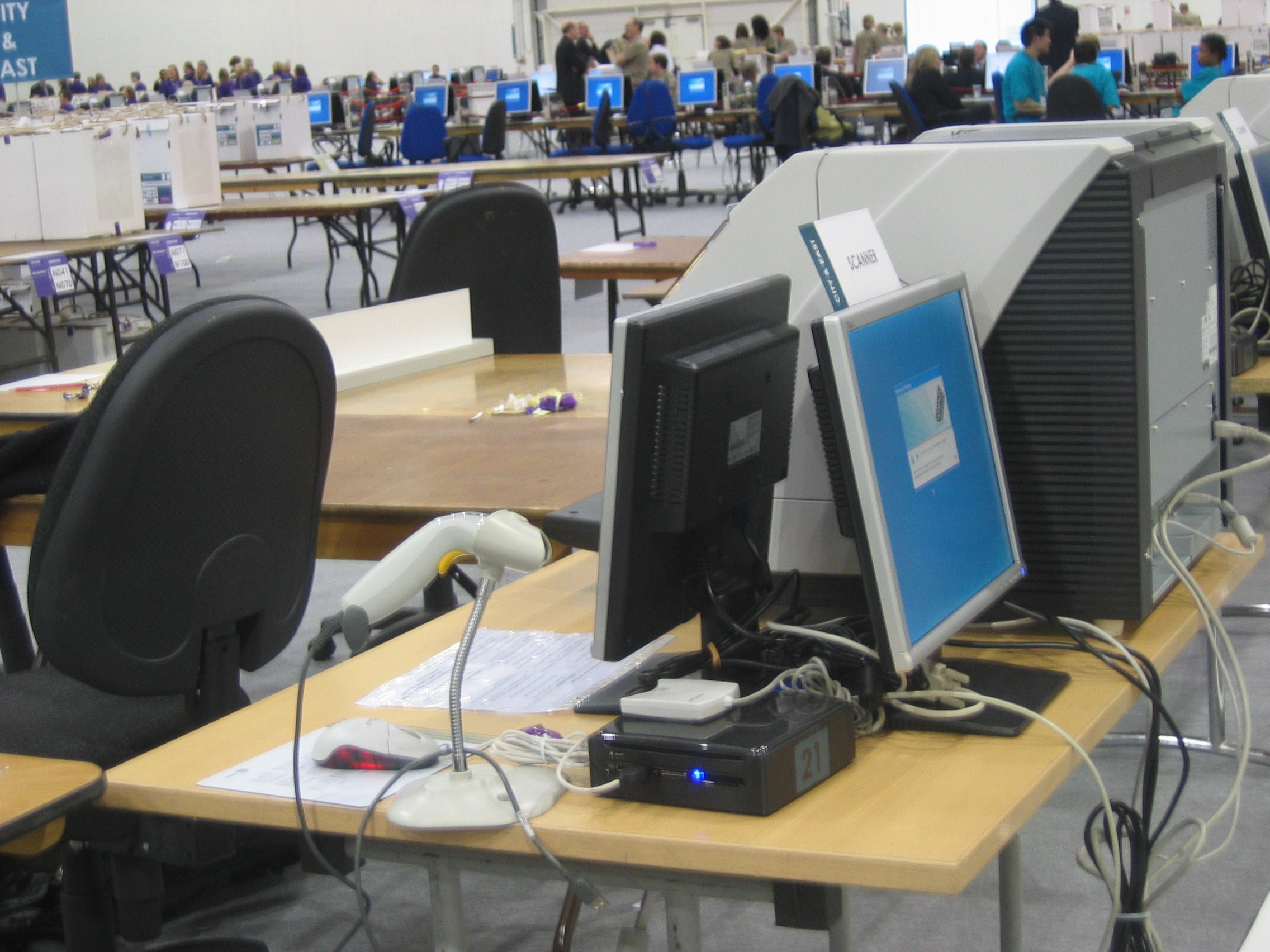
E-counting vote scanner

Votes were counted using an optical scan voting system, where a computer scans the ballot papers and registers the votes. A digital image of the ballot paper was also taken so if there were problems with any of the papers, they could be examined by humans. In 2008, due to the large turnout, the counting took over 15 hours. However, if counted manually the process could - according to London Elects - take up to 3 days. Election observers have declared "there is insufficient evidence available to allow independent observers to state reliably whether the results declared in the May 2008 elections for the Mayor of London and the London Assembly are an accurate representation of voters’ intentions." London Elects have been unable to publish an audit of some of the software used in the count. The Open Rights Group reports that there was equipment directly connected to the counting servers to which observers had limited or no access and that the presence of error messages, bugs and system freezes indicates poor software quality.

== Opinion polls ==
=== Graphical summaries ===
==== 5 way polling ====
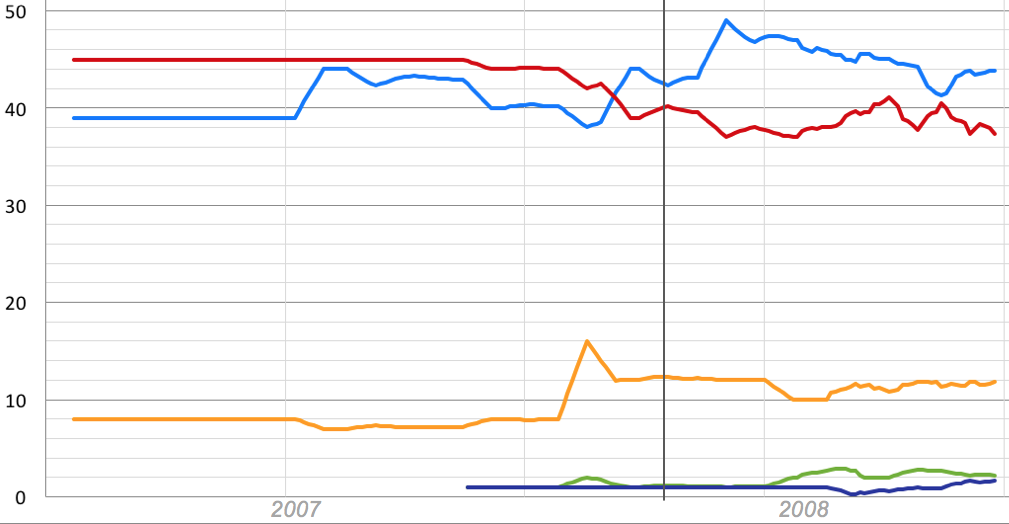
London opinion polling for the 2008 mayoral election (moving average is calculated from the last six polls) Johnson Livingstone Paddick Berry Barnbrook

==== Johnson vs. Livingstone ====
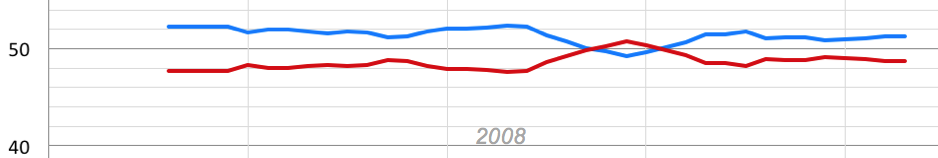
London opinion polling for the 2008 mayoral election between Boris Johnson and Ken Livingstone (moving average is calculated from the last six polls) Johnson Livingstone

=== 2008 ===
==== First and Second Round ====
Date	Pollster	First Preferences							Final Round	
Date	Pollster	Livingstone	Johnson	Paddick	Batten	Berry	Barnbrook	Others	Livingstone	Johnson
01/05/08	Election Results	37.0%	43.2%	9.8%	0.9%	3.2%	2.9%	3.0%	46.9%	53.2%
30/04/08	YouGov	36%	43%	13%	1%	2%	2%	3%	47%	53%
28/04/08	YouGov	35%	46%	12%	1%	2%	2%	2%	45%	55%
27/04/08	mruk Cello	44%	43%	9%	-	-	-	4%	51%	49%
24/04/08	Ipsos MORI	41%	38%	12%	-	-	-	9%	52%	48%
18/04/08	YouGov	37%	44%	12%	1%	3%	1%	2%	47%	53%
14/04/08	mruk Cello	45%	44%	9%	-	-	-	2%	50%	50%
11/04/08	YouGov	39%	45%	12%	1%	2%	1%	0%	46%	54%
09/04/08	Ipsos MORI	40%	46%	11%	1%	2%	0%	0%	49%	51%
07/04/08	Ipsos MORI	41%	40%	14%	0%	5%	0%	0%	49%	51%
04/04/08	YouGov	36%	49%	10%	1%	2%	1%	1%	44%	56%
01/04/08	ICM	41%	42%	10%	0%	4%	1%	2%	49%	51%

==== First Preferences only ====
Date	Pollster	First Preferences						
Date	Pollster	Livingstone	Johnson	Paddick	Batten	Berry	Barnbrook	Others
25/03/08	YouGov	37%	47%	10%	0%	2%	1%	3%
14/03/08	YouGov	37%	49%	12%	0%	1%	1%	0%
21/02/08	YouGov	39%	44%	12%	1%	1%	1%	2%
12/02/08	Ipsos MORI	42%	38%	16%	1%	2%	1%	0%
24/01/08	YouGov	44%	40%	8%	2%	1%	1%	4%

=== 2007 ===
==== First Preferences only ====
Date	Pollster	First Preferences			
Date	Pollster	Livingstone	Johnson	Paddick	Others
21/12/07	YouGov	45%	44%	7%	4%
09/11/07	YouGov	45%	39%	8%	8%

== Results ==
Mayor of London election 1 May 2008
Party	Candidate	1st round		2nd round			1st round votesTransfer votes, 2nd round
Party	Candidate	Total	Of round	Transfers	Total	Of round	1st round votesTransfer votes, 2nd round
Conservative	Boris Johnson	1,043,761	43.2%	124,977	1,168,738	53.2%	
Labour	Ken Livingstone	893,877	37.0%	134,089	1,027,966	46.8%	
Liberal Democrats	Brian Paddick	236,685	9.8%				
Green	Siân Berry	77,347	3.2%				
BNP	Richard Barnbrook	69,710	2.9%				
CPA	Alan Craig	39,249	1.6%				
UKIP	Gerard Batten	22,422	0.9%				
Left List	Lindsey German	16,796	0.7%				
English Democrat	Matt O'Connor	10,695	0.4%				
Independent	Winston McKenzie	5,389	0.2%				
Conservative gain from Labour							

- Turnout: 2,456,990 : 45.33%
- Increase of 8.38 percentage points.
- Rejected papers: 13,034 1st preference

== Maps ==
Results by assembly constituency

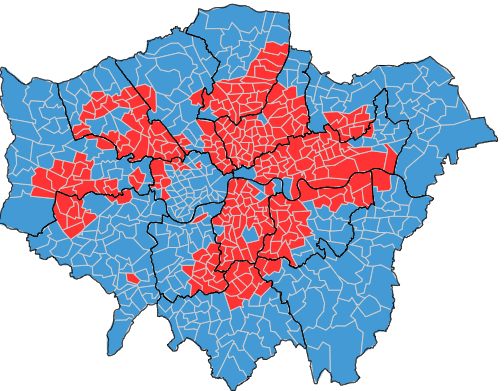
Result by electoral ward

== See also ==
- 2008 London Assembly election
- 2008 United Kingdom local elections
- Boris v. Ken
