= Left List =

Left Alternative
- Leader: Collective leadership (Central Committee)
- Founded: 2008
- Dissolved: 2010
- Headquarters: London
- Ideology: Socialism
- Political position: Left-wing

The Left List, later renamed the Left Alternative, was a political party active in the United Kingdom between 2008 and 2010. A minor party, it never had any of its candidates elected at any level of UK government although it inherited several local councillors who had defected to it from the Respect Party.

The Left List arose from a schism in the left-wing Respect Party in 2007. Various Respect members had been affiliated with the Socialist Workers Party (SWP), a far-left, Marxist group, and this had proved a cause for concern among other party members. In 2008 the SWP-affiliated members split and formed the Left List. The new party took part in the 2008 London mayoral elections and London Assembly elections, where it received under 1% of the vote. Its mayoral candidate, Lindsey German, came seventh. The party then adopted the name "Left Alternative" although several of its councillors defected either to the Labour Party or Conservative Party. It deregistered with the Electoral Commission in 2010.

== History ==
Respect was created in January 2004, using the issue of the war in Iraq to mobilise its vote. Beyond this issue, it attempted to have a broad socialist agenda. Respect allows its members to hold membership of other political organisations and notably included the SWP. Respect's most high-profile figure has been George Galloway, then Respect Member of Parliament for Bethnal Green and Bow, who was expelled from the Labour Party in 2003 for "bringing the party into disrepute".

=== The crisis in Respect ===
In September 2007, Galloway wrote a letter to Respect's national council members saying that the party was "too disorganised" and "faced oblivion" unless it reformed its internal party management. The letter also criticised the amount of money spent on the Organising for Fighting Unions conference and on an intervention at the Pride London LGBT rights event.

The letter was the opening shot in a dispute in Respect initially between Galloway and his supporters (including founding member Salma Yaqoob) on one side, and supporters of the SWP on the other. However, the arguments later began to affect all of the membership including those not in the SWP or close to Galloway or Yaqoob. In particular, Galloway called for the appointment of a National Organiser, who would support the National Secretary, John Rees (then an SWP member). The SWP perceived this to be an attempt to undermine John Rees who was the dominant voice for the SWP within Respect's leadership. A letter from their Central Committee stated: "The SWP believed that the post was created to undermine Respect National Secretary John Rees."

In the course of the dispute, the SWP expelled three members who sided with Galloway: Kevin Ovenden and Rob Hoveman, who both worked for George Galloway, and Nick Wrack, who was nominated for the position of National Organiser.

On 3 November 2007, Galloway's side announced plans to hold a "Respect Renewal" conference on 17 November, the same day as the planned national conference of Respect. The Respect Renewal conference was an open event and organisers claim 350 people attended. This figure was disputed by Chris Harman in International Socialism. The Respect national conference, which went ahead on the same day was attended by 270 delegates from 49 local branches and 17 student groups, as well as 90 observers.

Linda Smith, Respect's national chair at the time of the split, has claimed: "The sectarianism and 'control freak' methods of the SWP have led us to a situation where Respect is irretrievably split." The SWP has attributed the split to a shift to the right by George Galloway and his allies, motivated by electoralism (placing election-winning above other principles). This, say the SWP leadership, led to attacks on the SWP as the most prominent left group in Respect.

=== Left List emerges ===
The Electoral Commission refused to take a side in the split and therefore continued to recognise Linda Smith as the Nominating Officer for Respect. This means that her signature is required for candidates wishing to use the electoral label "Respect" (and similar registered names) on ballot papers in UK elections. A letter from the Electoral Commission to Linda Smith on 23 January 2008, set out its position on the split, following confusion on the matter from both sides.

Following the split, the side that included the SWP (but not Galloway or Linda Smith) nominated candidates in two district council by-elections. They could not use the name "Respect" on ballot papers without the signature of the nominating officer. Instead, both had no label on the ballot papers.

This side in the Respect split announced that in the London mayoral elections planned for 1 May 2008 it would stand Lindsey German for mayor (Respect's candidate in 2004 and chosen as Respect's candidate in 2007 prior to the schism) and candidates for the London Assembly, elected on the same date. It announced that its candidates would contest these elections under a new electoral label, the Left List, since Linda Smith had not allowed them to be listed on ballot papers as Respect candidates.

The Left List contested every constituency and stood on the London-wide proportional representation list. At the council elections on 1 May 2008, the Left List also contested seats as the Left List or the Left Party, Maxine Bowler in Burngreave, Sheffield. Respect Renewal stood in the City and East London constituency as well as contesting the London-wide list. George Galloway headed the London-wide party list, and Respect Renewal candidates stood under the name Respect (George Galloway).

Both factions of Respect suffered as a result and together failed to reach the previous number of votes.

=== Left Alternative ===
The organisation's website began to display the title Left Alternative in late June 2008. On 10 September 2008 John Rees and Lindsey German resigned from the Left Alternative National Committee. Most elected councillors who had joined Left List at the time of the split from Respect subsequently defected to other parties, mainly Labour, over the course of 2008. In 2008, one Left List councillor defected to the Conservative Party. In June of that year, the three remaining Left List councillors in Tower Hamlets, including the Chair and Nominating Officer of the Left List, defected to the Labour Party as did one Respect Renewal councillor.

The organisation's website ceased operation in mid-2009. The party deregistered from the Electoral Commission Register of Political Parties in April 2010.

== See also ==
- Stop the War Coalition
- Respect Coalition
- Socialist Workers Party (UK)
- Lindsey German
- John Rees
