= Boris v. Ken =

2008 book by Giles Edwards and Jonathan Isaby

Boris v. Ken: How Boris Johnson Won London
- Author: Giles Edwards, Jonathan Isaby
- Language: English
- Subject: Politics of London
- Published: London
- Publisher: Politico's
- Publication date: 2008
- Publication place: United Kingdom
- ISBN: 9781842752258
- Dewey Decimal: 352.2321609421

Boris v. Ken: How Boris Johnson Won London is a 2008 book by Giles Edwards and Jonathan Isaby about the 2008 London mayoral election.

== Background ==
Ken Livingstone won the 2000 London mayoral election as a left-wing independent against the official Labour Party candidate. Livingstone was readmitted to the Labour Party and won the 2004 election for Labour. In 2008, Boris Johnson became the first Conservative mayor of London after triumphing against Livingstone. The book examines the campaign. The book was referenced in the academic work, The Conservative Party: From Thatcher to Cameron and was placed on a reading list issued to Conservative MPs.

== Reception ==
In Total Politics magazine, Keith Simpson wrote 'Basically, this book tells the story of how Boris won and why Ken lost. The authors conclude by considering the impact on national politics of the election of Mayor Boris, not least in what they believe could become a rivalry between Boris and David Cameron', while in Progress magazine Peter Kellner described the book as a 'brisk and highly readable narrative' and noting 'The swing to the Conservatives was significantly less in London than in the local elections elsewhere in England'.

The book was also featured on BBC Parliament.
