= Kevin Ovenden =

British, left-wing, political activist (born 1968)

- Born: 1968 (age 57–58)
- Occupation: Political activist
- Political party: Respect Party

Kevin Ovenden (born 1968) is a British, left-wing, political activist who was a member of the Respect Party's leadership. He is an organiser of Viva Palestina.

== Biography ==
Ovenden was for many years a leading member of the Socialist Workers Party.

He was expelled during the split between the leadership of the SWP and the activists organized around George Galloway. He worked in the Westminster and Bethnal Green offices of then MP, George Galloway. It was arranged for him to speak at Socialism 2010, Chicago, 17 June 2010. He lives in Newham.

=== Gaza flotilla ===
Ovenden was on board the MV Mavi Marmara, part of the 2010 Gaza Freedom Flotilla which was raided by Israel. He was detained by Israeli forces and subsequently deported to Istanbul.

== Works ==
- Malcolm X: Socialism and Black Nationalism (Bookmarks, London, 1992)
- Education: Why our children deserve better than New Labour (with Chanie Rosenberg) (1999)
- "An Act Of State Terrorism", Counter Currents, Lee Sustar & Kevin Ovenden, 7 June 2010
- Syriza: Inside the Labyrinth (with Paul Mason) (September 2015)
