= Respect Party election results =

The Respect Party was a left-wing political party in the United Kingdom, founded in 2004 and dissolved in 2016. Its name is a contrived acronym standing for: Respect, Equality, Socialism, Peace, Environmentalism, Community and Trade Unionism. The Respect Party was established in London in January 2004; it grew out of the Stop the War Coalition, opposing the Iraq War.

== Parliamentary elections ==
=== By-elections, 2001–2005 ===
Date of election	Constituency	Candidate	Votes	%
15 July 2004	Birmingham Hodge Hill	John Rees	1,282	6.3
15 July 2004	Leicester South	Yvonne Ridley	3,724	12.7

=== 2005 general election ===
Map showing Respect results by constituency.

Summary of results:
No. of candidates: 26
Votes received: 81,860
% of total votes: 0.25%
Vote as % of electorate: 0.15%
Vote as % in seats contested: 6.84%
Lost deposits: 17 at a cost of £8,500

Constituency	Candidate	Votes	%
Bethnal Green and Bow	George Galloway	15,801	35.9
Birmingham Perry Barr	Dr Mohammad Naseem	2,173	5.6
Birmingham Sparkbrook and Small Heath	Ms Salma Yaqoob	10,498	27.5
Bradford North	U K Yildiz	474	1.4
Bristol East	Ms P A L North	532	1.3
Cambridge	T Woodcock	477	1.1
Cardiff Central	R G Raiz	386	1.1
South Dorset	B E Parkes	219	0.5
East Ham	A K Mian	8,171	20.7
Hackney South and Shoreditch	D Ryan	1,437	4.5
Harwich	J E Tipple	477	0.9
Hove	P O'Keeffe	268	0.6
Leicester South	Ms Yvonne Ridley	2,720	6.4
Luton South	M Ilyas	725	1.9
Neath	Ms H Falconer	257	0.7
Plymouth Devonport	A N Staunton	376	0.9
Poplar and Canning Town	O Rahman	6,573	16.8
Preston	Michael Lavalette	2,318	6.8
Sheffield Central	Ms M Bowler	1,284	4.3
Slough	A Khan	1,632	4.4
Stretford and Urmston	M B Krantz	950	2.5
Tooting	A J Zaidi	700	1.7
Tottenham	Ms J Alder	2,014	6.4
Tyne Bridge	Ms J C Russell	447	1.7
Walsall South	Ms N Fazal	1,146	3.2
West Ham	Ms Lindsey German	6,039	19.5

=== 2010 general election ===
Map showing Respect results by constituency.

Summary of results:
No. of candidates: 11
Votes received: 33,251
% of total votes: 0.11%
Vote as % of electorate: 0.07%
Vote as % in seats contested: 6.84%
Lost deposits: 8 at a cost of £4,000

Constituency	Candidate	Votes	%
Bethnal Green and Bow	Abjol Miah	8,532	16.8
Birmingham Hall Green	Ms Salma Yaqoob	12,240	25.1
Blackley and Broughton	Ms K A Phillips	996	2.9
Bradford West	A Ali	1,245	3.1
Brent Central	A Duale	230	0.5
Croydon, North	M Shaikh	272	0.5
Enfield Southgate	S Billoo	174	0.4
Garston and Halewood	Ms D L Raby	268	0.6
Manchester, Gorton	M Zulfikar	507	1.3
Oldham West and Royton	S Miah	627	1.5
Poplar and Limehouse	George Galloway	8,460	17.5

=== By-elections, 2010–2015 ===
Date of election	Constituency	Candidate	Votes	%
29 March 2012	Bradford West	George Galloway	18,341	55.9
15 November 2012	Croydon, North	Lee Jasper	707	2.9
15 November 2012	Manchester, Central	Catherine Higgins	182	1.1
29 November 2012	Rotherham	Ms Yvonne Ridley	1,778	8.3

=== 2015 general election ===
Summary of results:
No. of candidates: 4
Votes received: 9,989
% of total votes: 0.03%
Vote as % of electorate: 0.07%
Vote as % in seats contested: 5.80%
Lost deposits: 3 at a cost of £1,500

Constituency	Candidate	Votes	%
Bradford West	George Galloway	8,557	21.2
Birmingham Hall Green	Shiraz Peer	780	1.7
Halifax	Asama Javed	465	1.1
Birmingham Yardley	Teval Stephens	187	0.5
