= Respect Party =

Socialist political party in England and Wales from 2004 to 2016

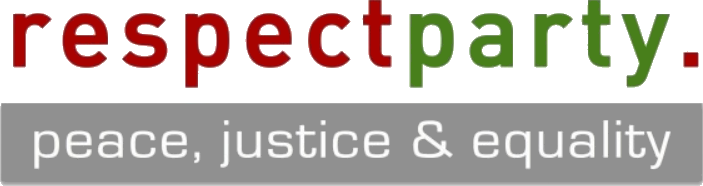
- Founded: 25 January 2004
- Dissolved: 18 August 2016
- Succeeded by: Respect Renewal; Left List
- Youth wing: Student RESPECT
- Membership (2014): 640
- Ideology: Anti-Zionism; Euroscepticism; Socialism
- Political position: Left-wing to far-left
- European affiliation: European Anti-Capitalist Left
- Colours: Red and green
- Slogan: "Peace, Justice & Equality"

The Respect Party was a left-wing to far-left socialist political party active in the United Kingdom between 2004 and 2016. At the height of its success in 2007, the party had one Member of Parliament (MP) in the House of Commons and nineteen councillors in local government.

The Respect Party was established in London by Salma Yaqoob and George Monbiot. Arising in the aftermath of the 2003 invasion of Iraq, it grew out of the Stop the War Coalition and from the start revolved largely around opposition to the United Kingdom's role in the Iraq War. Uniting a range of leftist and anti-war groups, it was unofficially allied to the Muslim Association of Britain (MAB) and the Socialist Workers Party (SWP), a far-left, Marxist group. In 2005, Respect's candidate George Galloway was elected MP for Bethnal Green and Bow and the party came second in three other constituencies. Respect made further gains in the 2006 and 2007 local elections, at which point its support peaked. In 2007, a schism emerged in the party between SWP supporters and the Respect Renewal group led by Galloway and Yaqoob; the former group left the party to form the Left List. Over the coming years, Respect gradually lost its council seats and it deregistered with the Electoral Commission in 2016.

Avowedly socialist and opposed to capitalism, Respect called for the nationalisation of much of the UK economy, increased funding to public services, and further measures to tackle poverty and discrimination. It was Eurosceptic and promoted an anti-imperialist worldview. It was also anti-Zionist, opposing the existence of Israel and endorsing the Palestine Solidarity Campaign. Due to its links with the MAB, several commentators claimed that Islamism was a component of its ideology and regarded it as part of a wider alliance between socialists and Islamists within Western Europe. Respect's voting base was primarily among the British Muslim communities in East London, Birmingham and Bradford, where it built upon opposition to the Iraq War and disenchantment among leftist voters with the governing Labour Party.

== Ideology ==
The political scientists Matthew Goodwin and Robert Ford characterised Respect as a "broad coalition of left-wing interests" which had arisen in opposition to the New Labour government and the UK's involvement in the invasion of Iraq. Other political scientists characterised the party as far-left. The socialist activist Tariq Ali characterised the party's programme as being social democratic in orientation. Eran Benedek described the party as "an amalgamation of radical international socialism and Islamism", adding that its radical socialist position was informed by Marxism–Leninism and Trotskyism.

Benedek characterised it as a manifestation of what Amir Taheri called the "Marxist-Islamist coalition", which united around opposition to the United States, a desire to destroy the state of Israel, and a wish to overthrow international capitalism. Similarly, Emmanuel Karagiannis characterised the party as "the epitome" of the "convergence" between radical left and Islamist groups in Western Europe, and Nick Cohen described it as an "alliance ... between the Trotskyist far left and the Islamic far right".

=== Socialism and anti-capitalism ===
The party's policies have been described as "traditionally leftist and anti-capitalist". Respect encouraged the nationalisation of many sectors of the economy, including the railways, water, gas, electricity, and the North Sea oil industry. It urged a substantial increase in corporation tax in order to increase funding to public services. It sought to overturn what it described as "anti-trade union" legislation, and to introduce policies to deal with issues of poverty and discrimination. Respect promoted revolutionary socialism and international socialism. The party was largely hostile to Western capitalism and neoliberalism, and interpreted many world events through the prism of anti-imperialism, calling for an end to what it characterised as imperialist wars like that in Iraq. Respect was anti-globalization, believing that it resulted in the exploitation of the working class. It also expressed a Eurosceptic approach to the European Union, deeming the Union to be lacking in democracy and exploitative toward the working class.

=== Anti-Zionism ===
Respect was anti-Zionist and, according to Benedek, rejected "the right to independent Jewish statehood in Israel". It presented this position through the terminology of social justice and human rights. One of its core principles was stated support for the Palestinian people and opposition to what Respect described as "the apartheid system that oppresses them". It was constitutionally committed to supporting the Palestine Solidarity Campaign and the boycotting of Israel. It calls for Israel to withdraw from any land conquered in 1967, and for the right of return to be granted to all Palestinians forced to move on the formation of the state of Israel in 1948. On its website and published fliers, it included maps of the Levant in which the entirety of Israel was labelled "Occupied Palestine". In 2017, the party's website asserts: "Respect supports the idea of a democratic bi-national solution of one state from the Jordan River to the Mediterranean Sea in which all people, Jews, Muslims and Christians live equally; one man, one woman, one vote" and says British foreign policy should recognise Britain's "partial responsibility for the problem by their participation in the creation of the state of Israel".

According to the party's national council member Yvonne Ridley, speaking at London's Imperial College in February 2006, Respect "is a Zionist-free party... if there was any Zionism in the Respect Party they would be hunted down and kicked out."

The rejection of Israel's right to exist and the characterisation of it as a garrison of American imperialism in the Middle East had been espoused by the SWP even prior to the establishment of Respect.

In February 2013, George Galloway walked out of a debate organised by Christ Church, Oxford because his opponent was Eylon Levy, an Israeli citizen. He explained his actions thus: "The reason is simple: no recognition, no normalisation. Just boycott, divestment and sanctions, until the apartheid state is defeated. I never debate with Israelis nor speak to their media. If they want to speak about Palestine – the address is the PLO." The Zionist Federation called it a "racist" walkout displaying "xenophobic" tendencies.

Respect was supportive of anti-Zionist Islamist militant groups like Hezbollah and Hamas. In July 2006, Respect official Lindsey German stated that "whatever disagreements I have with Hamas and Hezbollah, I would rather be in their camp... they want democracy. Democracy in the Middle East is Hamas, is Hezbollah". Galloway met with Hamas leader Khaled Mashal in September 2006, and that November the party's national-secretary John Rees attended the Beirut International Conference organised by Hezbollah.

== History ==
=== Formation: 2004 ===
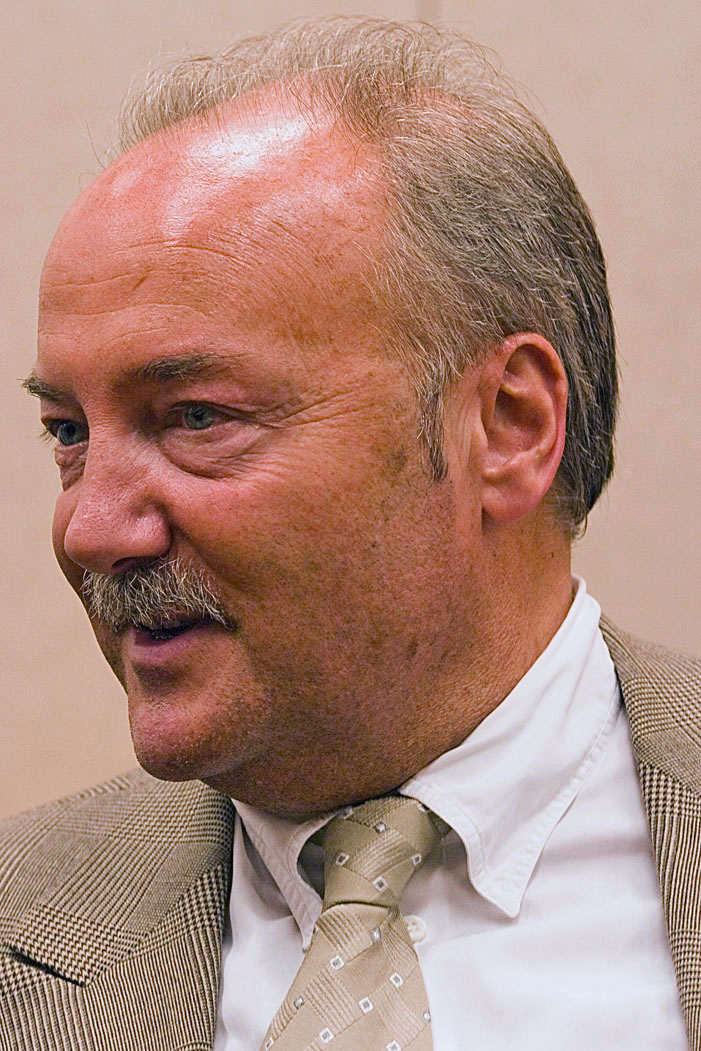
George Galloway in September 2005

Respect emerged from the British anti-war movement which had developed from late 2001 onward. The Stop the War Coalition (StWC) had been established in September 2001, with a central role being played by the Socialist Workers Party (SWP), which was then the largest radical left group in the UK. The StWC's president was Tony Benn, a Labour Member of Parliament (MP) until 2001, while it also gained the support of several rebel Labour MPs, among them Katy Clark, Jeremy Corbyn, Tam Dalyell, Alice Mahon, and George Galloway. The StWC had also attracted significant support from within Britain's Muslim community, and the Muslim Association of Britain (MAB) officially affiliated itself with the coalition. The movement politicised a large number of young British Muslims, among them Salma Yaqoob, who became the head of the StWC branch in Birmingham.

Galloway later revealed that, about a year before the UK and US launched the Iraq War, he had broached the subject of leaving Labour and establishing a new party with his friends Seumas Milne and Andrew Murray. At the time—he later stated—he was of the view that UK Prime Minister Tony Blair and US President George W. Bush had already committed themselves to invading Iraq. Galloway was vocal in his opposition to Blair's calls for an invasion, and in May 2003 he was suspended from the Labour Party and then expelled in October, having been found to have brought it into disrepute. He then announced that he would stand against Labour in the 2004 European Parliament elections, and that he would "seek to unify the red, green, anti-war, Muslim and other social constituencies radicalised by the war, in a referendum on Tony Blair".

The two main instigators of the party were Yaqoob and George Monbiot, a journalist with The Guardian. They had been part of a discussion surrounding the unification of a broad range of anti-war forces that were to the left of Labour, a successor to the Socialist Alliance electoral list that had contested the 2001 general election. They wanted to reach out beyond the far left's traditional support base and gain support from peace activists and religious groups, particularly the Muslim community. In November 2003, a number of public meetings were held under the title of "British Politics at the Crossroads", at which it was agreed that a new political party should be established. At a convention on 24 January 2004, the party, titled "Respect – the Unity Coalition", was officially declared. The name "RESPECT" was a contrived acronym for respect, equality, socialism, peace, environmentalism, community, and trade unionism. Galloway said in April 2004: "Respect. It's a young word. It's a black word. It's the first postmodern name for an electoral political movement; most are one or other arrangement of the words The, Something, and Party. With respect, we're different." Opposition to the Iraq War was the party's primary issue, around which it galvanised much of its support.

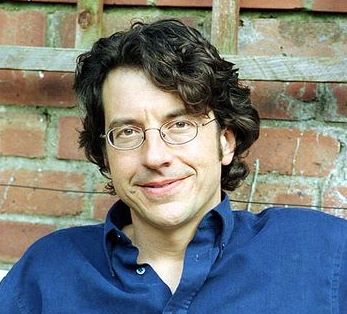
The founders of Respect: Salma Yaqoob (left) and George Monbiot

At its foundation, the party also called for a halt to privatisation and the renationalisation of the British railways. Although it did not secure the full backing of any major trade unions, some local branches of the National Union of Rail, Maritime and Transport Workers (RMT)—which had disaffiliated from Labour in February 2004—voted to support Respect. Although containing members from both the SWP and MAB, Respect was not a formal coalition between the two groups. From the beginnings of Respect, there remained tension within the party between SWP members and Muslim leaders. This alliance was also criticised by some observers; in June 2004, the political commentator Nick Cohen wrote that "for the first time since the Enlightenment, a section of the left is allied with religious fanaticism and, for the first time since the Hitler-Stalin pact, a section of the left has gone soft on fascism."

Respect initially tried to form an electoral pact with the Green Party of England and Wales but this proved unsuccessful. The Greens stated that they had selected their candidates for the 2004 European Parliamentary elections by postal ballot months previously and that they were also sceptical of the SWP's influence over Respect. After Respect decided to stand candidates against the Greens, Monbiot stepped down from the party in February 2004, claiming that to compete against the Greens might threaten the positions of "two of the best elected representatives in Britain", the Green Members of the European Parliament (MEPs) Caroline Lucas and Jean Lambert.

=== Early electoral campaigns: 2004–05 ===
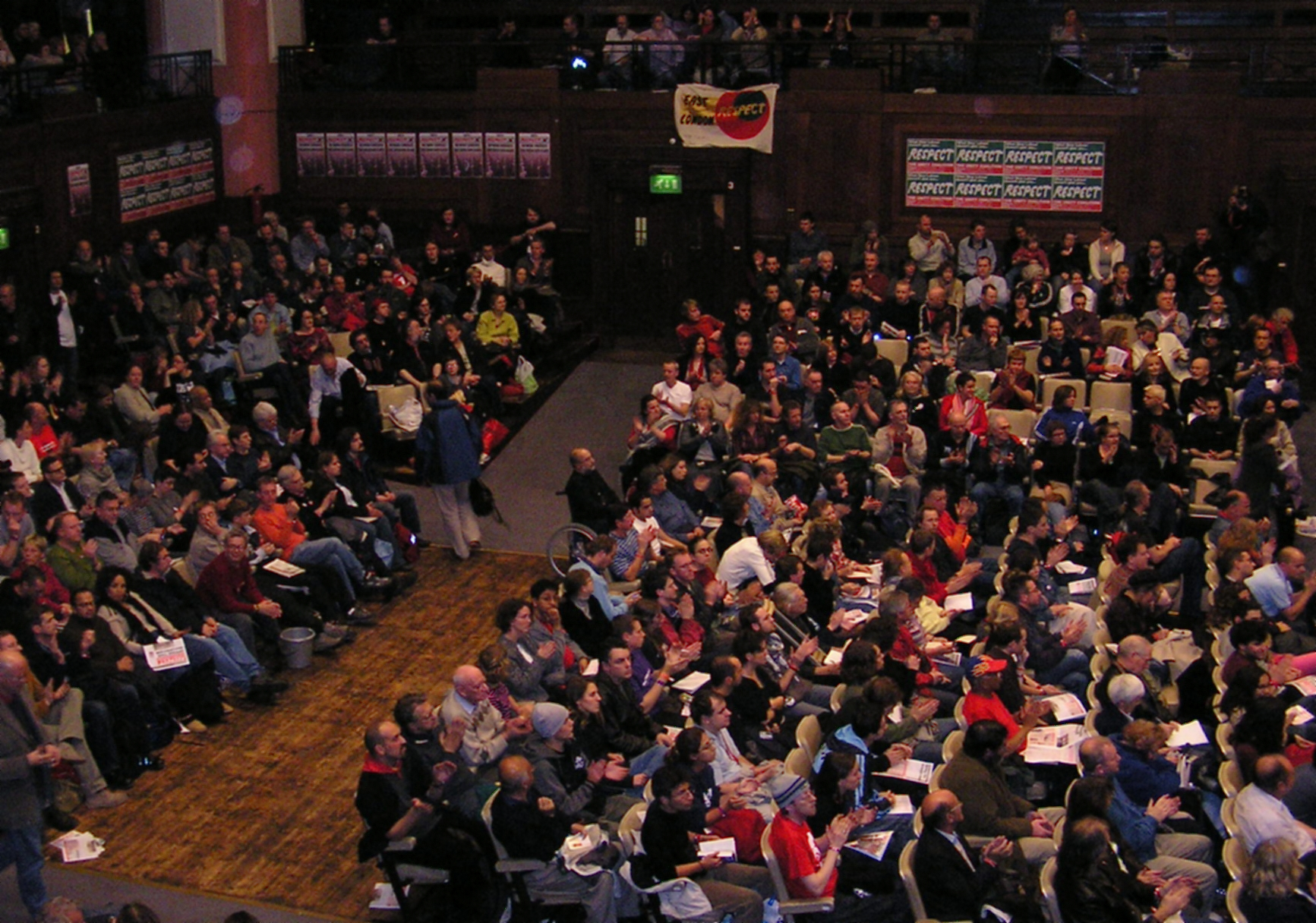
Respect fringe meeting at the 2004 European Social Forum

Respect fielded candidates for both the 2004 elections for the European Parliament (EP) and for the London Assembly, attempting to present these elections as a referendum on Blair's Labour government. The party claims that this support was achieved primarily as a result of the anti-war protests and by attracting votes from "disillusioned" Labour voters. The party was widely derided in the British media, which viewed Respect as a single-issue party that would soon disappear from British politics.

Respect polled a quarter of a million votes in the EP election. Its proportion of the national vote was 1.7%, which grew to 5% in London, although it failed to win any seats. The strong showing of the Greens and the UK Independence Party had been part of the reason for this failure to secure a seat. In the London Assembly election, Respect secured 4.5% of the vote, meaning that they did not secure a seat on the Assembly. However, within both the London Borough of Newham and the London Borough of Tower Hamlets—both areas with large Muslim populations—Respect secured the largest number of votes, with over 20% in both. Respect mocked Ken Livingstone's Labour candidacy as the "Blair Mayor Project".

Respect's first election victory was in the council by-election for the St Dunstan's and Stepney Green ward of Tower Hamlets, where its candidate, Oliur Rahman, secured 31% of the vote. At the Birmingham Hodge Hill and Leicester South by-elections, both held on 15 July 2004, the party gained 6.3% and 12.7% of the vote respectively. At the time, following defections from other parties, Respect had a council seat in Nuneaton and another in Preston.

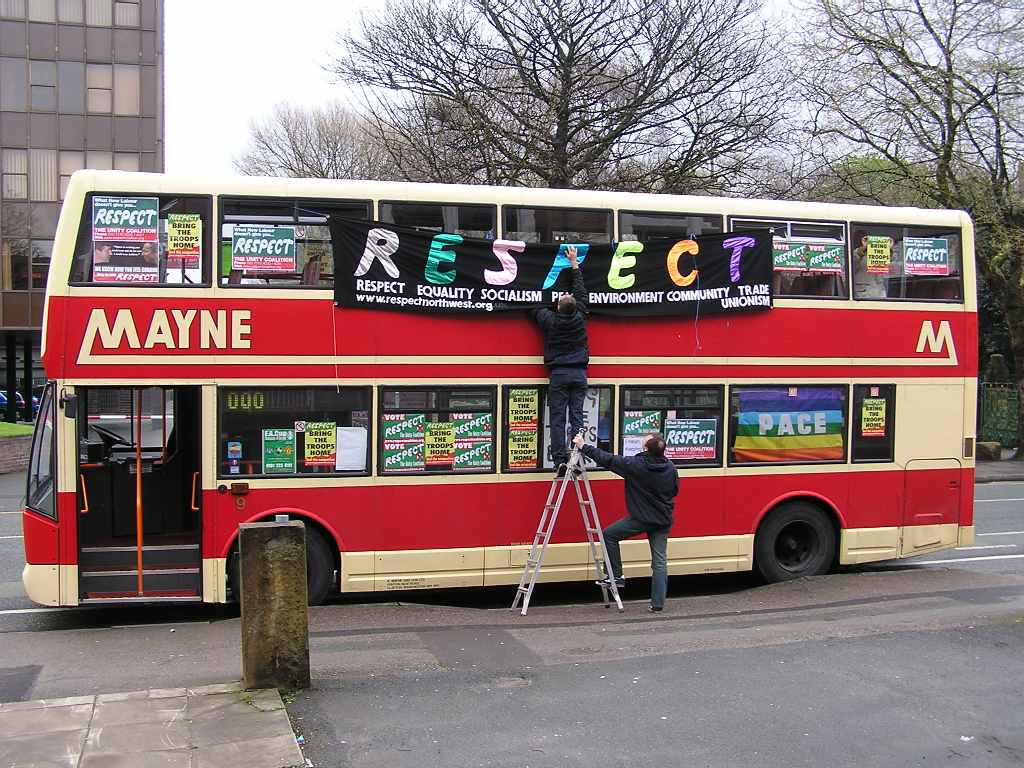
Respect campaigners decorating a bus in Manchester for the 2005 elections

The coalition put up candidates in 26 constituencies across England and Wales, just under half of them from the SWP. However, Britain's first past the post electoral system made it difficult for small parties to make gains unless they geographically concentrated their vote. Respect recognised that East London, an area with large numbers of Muslim British Bangladeshis, would be electorally lucrative, particularly as three of the area's four sitting Labour MPs had voted in favour of British participation in the invasion of Iraq. At the 2005 general election Respect fielded candidates in this area: Lindsey German in West Ham, Abdul Khaliq Mian in East Ham, Rahman in Poplar and Canning Town, and Galloway in Bethnal Green and Bow.

Galloway sought to unseat the sitting Labour MP, Oona King, and the ensuing campaign for the seat has been cited as "one of the most acrimonious in recent history". King accused Galloway of sexual impropriety, although was later forced to retract those allegations. She alleged that she had been the victim of antisemitism from Respect supporters after having been pelted with eggs at a Jewish memorial service. She also claimed that Respect canvassers had urged Muslims not to vote for her because she is Jewish. Respect threatened legal action if King repeated the claim; John Rees, national secretary of Respect, said "George Galloway and everyone in Respect has a long record of fighting anti-semitism - longer I suspect than Oona King. This kind of rubbish is libellous. Oona King should be more cognisant of the dangers, having already paid out two sets of libel writs to George."

Respect won 0.3% of the national vote, with an average of 6.8% of the vote in the constituencies it had contested; 17 of its candidates failed to have their deposits returned. However, Galloway won the seat of Bethnal Green and Bow by a narrow margin of 823 votes. Galloway's surprise victory provided much momentum for his party. His victory represented the first time that a party to the left of Labour had won a seat in the Houses of Parliament since 1951. Respect also did well in several other constituencies, coming second to Labour in both West Ham and East Ham, and also securing second place in Birmingham Sparkbrook and Small Heath, where Yaqoob had been its candidate, securing 27.5% of the vote.

Respect made "rapid progress", aided by growing finances and the existing campaign experience of the far left. By the end of 2005, in the London Borough of Newham, two Labour and one Liberal Democrat councillor had defected to Respect. By December 2005, it had an official membership of 5,674. Galloway, however, told Decca Aitkenhead in April 2012 for a Guardian profile that Respect, at its peak, only had about 3–4,000 members. Its university wing, Student Respect, claimed by 2007 to have branches in over fifty campuses across England and Wales. Benedek suggested that this probably made it the fastest-growing student political group in the UK. The SWP's student group, the Socialist Worker Student Society (SWSS), encouraged its members to join Respect and became largely dormant.

=== Local electoral victories: 2006–07 ===
Respect candidate Ghazi Khan, with someone dressed as Blair, at the 18 March 2006 Anti-War Protest in London

In 2006, Galloway appeared on Channel 4's reality television show Celebrity Big Brother. His hope was to use it as a public relations exercise in which he could promote his views to a wider audience, however this backfired as Channel 4 producers censored most of his political discussions. Media attention instead focused on the fact that he had seemingly abandoned his constituents to appear in the show and on an episode in which he had impersonated a cat. This did little to damage Respect's electoral appeal.

Respect stood about 150 candidates in the 2006 local elections, at which it secured 16 seats. At Respect's campaign launch, Galloway anticipated a "referendum on new Labour", and said the election "will be the last blow that will knock out Tony Blair". In Tower Hamlets, Respect took eleven new council seats, giving it a total of twelve and making it the borough's official opposition to Labour. In Newham, Respect gained 26% of the vote and returned its three councillors, although was disappointed not to gain further ones. In Birmingham, Respect gained 55% of the vote in the Sparkbrook ward, and Yaqoob was elected as the city's first female Muslim councillor. None of the new Respect councillors were connected with the SWP. Galloway explained at the time that many Respect supporters "are small business people and wouldn't describe themselves as socialists and are not bound to accept it."

Respect stood 48 candidates in the 2007 local election, of which three were elected. The party had peaked, and following this would witness a decline. In July 2007, Galloway was suspended from the House of Commons for 18 days after the standards and privileges commit accused him of a lack of transparency in the financing of his charity, the Mariam Appeal. In August, a Respect councillor in Tower Hamlets resigned, triggering a by-election which Harun Miah narrowly secured for Respect.

=== Schism: 2007 ===
The SWP had been members of Respect's "Unity Coalition" since its early years, although relations between them and Galloway had been strained. In August 2007 he wrote a letter to the party's national council stating that Respect had various internal weaknesses, with many deeming this a veiled criticism of the SWP. This generated rifts within the SWP itself as two of its members were expelled for refusing to step down as Galloway's parliamentary assistants. By October, SWP publications were claiming that there was a "witch hunt" against socialists within Respect, despite the presence of socialist groups other than the SWP. That month, disagreements between Rahman and Abjol Miah, leader of the Respect group in Tower Hamlets, resulted in four of the borough's councillors resigning the Respect Party whip.

By November 2007, Respect had split into two rival factions. The first consisted largely of members affiliated with the SWP and included the rebel councillors from Tower Hamlets. The second, which named itself Respect Renewal, was led by Galloway and Yaqoob and had the support of virtually all of the party's elected representatives and national council. According to political scientist Timothy Peace, these events were "characteristic of the faction fighting that has always plagued the radical left." The SWP-allied faction controlled the party's website and claimed that Galloway had simply left the party, of which they were the rightful representatives. The Respect Renewal group changed the locks of the party's national office and barred access to SWP supporters. On 17 November, both groups held conferences at which they claimed to be the legitimate manifestation of Respect. The Electoral Commission subsequently ruled that control of the party's name rested with Fire Brigades Union activist Linda Smith, the nominating officer; she had sided with Galloway, meaning that the Respect Renewal group were able to continue using the name. The SWP faction split and began using the name Left List.

The SWP attributed the split to a shift to the right by Galloway and his allies, motivated by electoralism (seeking to gain Muslim votes) and attacks on the left. This opinion was shared by Hilary Wainwright, who saw a common pattern of "leaderism" in this and other leftist debacles, although she thought Galloway possessed positive qualities. SWP-dominated branches of Respect were reportedly less active than those with far fewer members of that group. A narrow failure of John Rees in 2006 to gain election in the Tower Hamlets local elections, while the 12 candidates from the Bangladeshi community were all elected, was also alleged to have alienated the SWP from the project.

In December 2009, the party de-registered (removed) itself from the Register of Political Parties for Northern Ireland, but remained registered for England, Scotland and Wales.

=== Decline: 2008–2011 ===
Respect went into gradual decline after 2008. By this point its primary unifying issue, anger at Labour over the Iraq War, had become less salient, with the political scientist Stephen Driver suggesting that for this reason Respect "struggled to be anything more than a one-trick pony". The party was in disarray following the schism and only forwarded one candidate for the 2008 London Assembly elections. This candidate, Hanif Abdulmuhit, stood for the City and East constituency and secured 15% of the vote but trailed behind their Labour and Conservative Party rivals. Overall Respect attained 2.4% of the London Assembly vote, below the 5% threshold needed to secure a seat. Galloway had headed the Respect (London-wide) top-up list. Respect had not fielded a candidate for London Mayor, instead endorsing Labour's Ken Livingstone, while Left List had fielded German, who secured significantly fewer votes than she had gained as a Respect candidate for Mayor in 2004. The outbreak of the 2008 Gaza War provided renewed impetus for Respect's campaigning. Throughout much of 2009, the party devoted much of its resources to raising funds for the Viva Palestina aid convoy to alleviate the humanitarian crisis in the Gaza Strip. The first convoy, which set off from Glasgow in February 2009, was led by Respect member Kevin Ovenden.

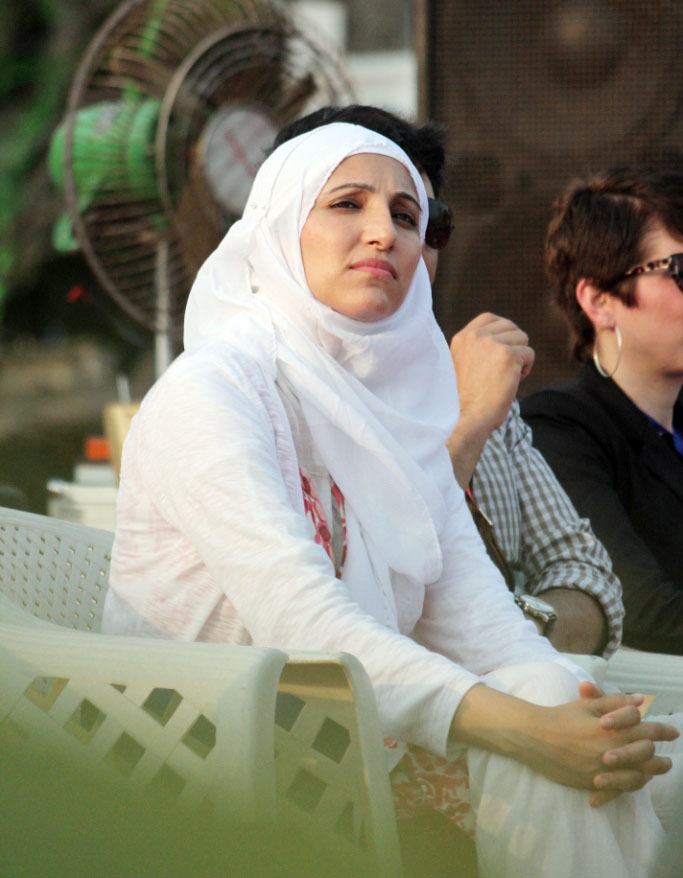
At the time of the 2010 general election, Yaqoob was Respect's leader

Respect Renewal stood 10 candidates in the local council elections also taking place on 1 May across England and Wales. They returned one new councillor, Nahim Khan, in Birmingham Sparkbrook, who received 42.64% of the vote. The party did not field any candidates for the 2009 European Parliament elections, instead urging supporters to vote for either the Green Party or the left-wing Eurosceptic alliance, No2EU. Instead, Arthur Scargill's Socialist Labour Party proved to be the most successful radical left party in the election, securing 1.1% of the national vote.

Respect fielded ten candidates in the 2010 general election, with a particular focus on three that they considered winnable. The party's manifesto highlighted that a hung parliament would be likely, and that if there were three Respect MPs in the House of Commons then they would have a chance of forming a coalition with a minority government. Their three targeted seats were Birmingham Hall Green, which was being contested by Yaqoob—who was then party leader—Poplar and Limehouse, which was contested by Galloway, and Galloway's existing seat of Bethnal Green and Bow, which was being defended by Miah. The election however proved disastrous for Respect. Labour secured all three of the seats that Respect had targeted, with Galloway and Miah being pushed into third place with 17% of the vote. Nationwide it had secured 33,251 votes, less than half of that which it had attained in the 2005 general election. Local elections were held on the same day which also resulted in significant losses for Respect; in Tower Hamlets it went from having eight councillors to one, and in Newham it lost all its councillors.

However the party had better results elsewhere. In Birmingham Hall Green constituency Respect candidate Salma Yaqoob performed better, receiving 12,240 votes, 25.1%, placing second after Labour candidate Roger Godsiff, who received 16,039 votes, 32.9%.

Respect fielded eight more candidates in other constituencies, who together polled 4,319 votes. Arshad Ali received 1,245 votes, 3.1%, in Bradford West, and Kay Phillips received 996 votes, 2.9%, in Blackley and Broughton. In total, Respect candidates received 33,269 votes, which amounted to 6.8% of the total vote in the constituencies where they stood and 0.1% of the total UK vote.

During the 2010 General Election the Green Party stood down in favour of Respect candidates in Birmingham Sparkbrook and Blackley and Broughton. While Respect agreed not to stand against the Trade Unionist and Socialist Coalition candidate in Salford and Eccles or to oppose the Greens standing in Manchester Central, indicating the beginning of a tentative co-operation between the three parties locally. Galloway told Decca Aitkenhead in April 2012: "When we lost the three parliamentary seats in 2010 that we'd hoped to win, we became almost minuscule"; Respect he said then had about 8-900 members.

Abjol Miah was elected as the National Chair of Respect in January 2011. After the introduction of a directly elected mayor of Tower Hamlets—something that Respect had campaigned for locally—the party backed the successful independent candidate Lutfur Rahman.

On 5 May 2011, in the 2011 Scottish Parliament election, the Respect Party, on whose list Galloway stood in the Glasgow electoral region, received 6,972 votes (3.3%). He campaigned under the banner of Coalition Against the Cuts, but the vote was insufficient to become a Member of the Scottish Parliament in the proportional voting system used. In the Birmingham City Council election of 2011, Respect lost one of its three councillors to Labour. In July, Yaqoob then resigned for health reasons, leaving the party with only one councillor in the city.

=== 2012: Galloway wins Bradford West by-election ===
Galloway successfully contested Bradford West in a by-election held on 29 March 2012, following the resignation of Labour MP Marsha Singh due to ill health.

Galloway and his supporters, such as the Muslim Public Affairs Committee (MPACUK), were active in a campaign against Imran Hussain, the Muslim deputy leader of Bradford City Council, whose commitment to his faith was queried because he is reported to drink alcohol. Meanwhile, one of Galloway's supporting speakers at a rally on the Sunday before the byelection was Abjol Miah, once group leader of the Respect councillors in Tower Hamlets, who is also active in the IFE.

Galloway was elected with a majority of 10,140 with one of the largest swings in the polls against the defending political party in modern political history.

=== 2012: party resignations ===
Yaqoob resigned as party leader in September, following Galloway's remarks about rape with respect to the Julian Assange case. She told a reporter from The Guardian that she had had to make a choice between "standing up for the rights of women" and her admiration for Galloway's "anti-imperialist stance". In October 2012, party secretary Chris Chilvers said Respect had 2,000 members, while before the by-election it had 300. Arshad Ali, who succeeded Yaqoob as leader, resigned as national chair in December 2012 after it was discovered that he has a spent conviction for electoral fraud (dating from his time in the Labour Party), although at this point the Electoral Commission still had Yaqoob listed as the party's leader.

Kate Hudson had originally been selected for the Manchester Central by-election, but stood down in early September following Galloway's comments on rape, and left the party in October. In the same month, Respect announced that Catherine Higgins, a local "community advocate", would contest the by-election on 15 November 2012. Higgins finished ninth out of 12 candidates.

In November 2012, at a rally in Rotherham, Respect announced that Yvonne Ridley had been chosen to contend the Rotherham by-election. The election took place on 29 November 2012; Ridley finished fourth with 8% of the vote, ahead of both the Conservative and Liberal Democrat candidates, but behind UKIP and the BNP.

=== 2012–15: Respect's Bradford councillors ===
Respect won five seats on Bradford Council in May 2012 following Galloway's success in the by-election at the end of March. Amid a fiercely fought campaign, there were claims and complaints of violence and harassment by the Respect Party and its opponents. The party came second in Oldham's Werneth ward and Tower Hamlets' Weavers ward.

Following several months of inconclusive reports in the media, on 10 August 2013, the Bradford Telegraph & Argus reported that Galloway might not be a candidate in Bradford at the 2015 general election and instead stand in the 2016 London Mayoral election. The five Respect councillors in Bradford elected the previous year resigned from the party whip on 15 August 2013 after coming into conflict with Galloway over his comments that he might run in the London mayoral election. They argued that the MP was needed in Bradford. Two of the councillors had said the MP should resign if he intended to stand in London; Galloway and his associates had immediately suspended them, although their three fellow council members were in agreement. One of the other three councillors, Alyas Karmani, then leader of the Respect group on Bradford City Council, said the party had not, in fact, been consulted about Galloway's plans.

Galloway had also claimed that the councillors were working against him and the party with Aisha Ali Khan, his former aide, and her husband. (Both Ali Khan and her husband later received criminal convictions related to her former employment by Galloway.) After no retraction of the assertions made against them had been forthcoming, the five councillors entirely severed their connections with Respect towards the end of October and then intended to sit as independents for the remainder of their term of office. Claims that they had been "conniving" with Galloway's former aide were false, they said. A spokesman from Respect accused them of attempting to gain control of the party in Bradford.

In the 2014 local elections, Respect stood eight candidates in Bradford, but none of them won in their council wards. Two other Respect councillors lost their seats, leaving Respect without any representation on local authorities. In 2014, the party had only 630 members and assets of £1,947. By that point, the party was largely a vehicle for Galloway's personality.

This changed in March 2015 when four of the former Respect councillors rejoined and a Labour member of the council, Asama Javed, left the party and aligned herself with Respect. The remaining councillor of the five who resigned in August 2013, Mohammad Shabbir, announced he was joining the Labour group on the council in mid-April 2015 with immediate effect rather than rejoining Respect with his former colleagues. In July 2015, the four councillors who had rejoined reversed their decision and decided to continue under the Bradford Independent Group label, although rejoining Respect was still a possibility.

=== 2015–16: general election and de-registration ===
At the 2015 general election, Respect had four candidates, in Halifax and two Birmingham seats (Hall Green and Yardley) in addition to Bradford West. Where Respect was not standing in the election, Galloway had urged a vote for Labour in 2013, having met and been impressed with then Labour leader Ed Miliband. None of the Respect candidates were elected. In George Galloway's own seat, the 10,000 majority he had gained at the 2012 Bradford West by-election was reversed, and the Labour Party candidate Naz Shah became the constituency's MP with a majority of 11,420 votes.

In December 2015, it became known that former Respect Party leader Salma Yaqoob had applied to join the Labour Party in Hall Green following Jeremy Corbyn's election as leader. Her application was rejected by her local constituency Labour Party owing to her standing against Labour candidates.

Robert Colvile reported in The Spectator at the beginning of January 2016:

Respect barely exists in Bradford—or anywhere else. In 2013, the membership fell to 230 people. Last year [2014], that had rebounded to 630—but beyond their membership fees, Respect raised only £1,133 in donations. Its assets were just £1,947.

Following his defeat in the 2015 general election, Galloway announced that he would stand as Respect's candidate in the 2016 London mayoral election. During hustings, he praised newly elected Labour leader Jeremy Corbyn, but condemned Labour Mayoral candidate Sadiq Khan as a "flip-flop merchant" and a "product of the Blairite machine". In the final result of the London Mayoral election held on 5 May 2016, Galloway came seventh with 37,007 (1.4%) first preference votes. After second preference were accounted for, Sadiq Khan became London mayor. Respect failed to hold any of their seats in Bradford in the 2016 local elections, leaving them without any representation at any level of government.

The Respect Party "voluntarily deregistered" from the Electoral Commission's Register of Political Parties on 18 August 2016, twelve years after it initially registered.

== Support ==
=== Voter base ===
Since its formation, Respect has presented itself as being "genuinely left" and has sought to appeal to leftist voters dissatisfied with the Labour Party's shift to the centre under the leadership of Blair and Gordon Brown. There has however been little electoral support for parties to the left of Labour in Britain (with some exceptions to the Liberal Democrats, who during the New Labour era broadly positioned themselves to the left), with the party having to seek out an alternative voting base.

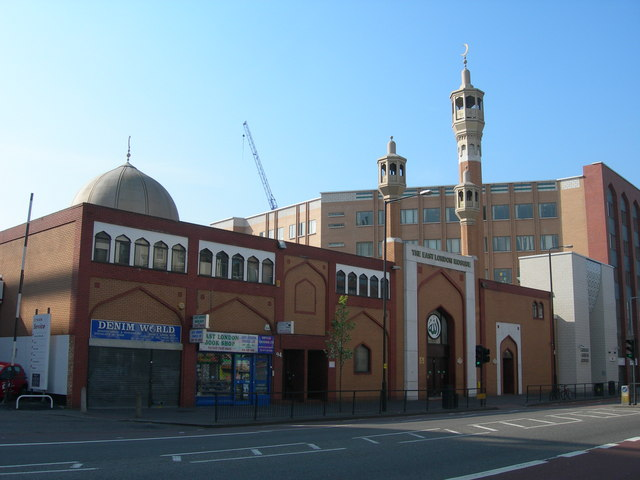
The East London Mosque, where Respect helped canvass support for it

The primary electoral support for Respect came from the British Muslim community. Traditionally, British Muslims voted for the Labour Party, but many had been disenchanted following the Labour government's decision to invade Iraq. Respect appealed in particular to British Muslims who had been disenchanted by the war. According to Emmanuel Karagiannis, "now that the old working class has assimilated into an expanded middle class, the radical Left is obviously looking for a new constituency, and Europe's deprived and alienated Muslim communities may well be the answer." The political scientist Stephen Driver suggested that this over-reliance on dissatisfied Muslim voters left its electoral base "fragile", for when "the source of the protest disappears, so do the protest votes".

At no point did Respect position itself as a specifically Muslim party akin to the Islamic Party of Britain or the Muslim Party in Birmingham, however from its beginnings it did specifically target Muslims with its campaign material, characterising itself as "the party for Muslims" and focusing on issues of particular concern to British Muslim communities. A local election flyer printed in 2004 featured the slogan "George Galloway – Fighting for Muslim Rights!" It often fielded Muslim candidates to stand in largely Muslim areas, although this was not unusual in British politics, with Labour, the Conservatives, and the Liberal Democrats often doing the same.

Respect's main electoral support base was in East London and Birmingham. However, there were other areas of Britain with large Islamic communities—such as Yorkshire, Lancashire, and Leicester—where the party did not do well. Peace suggested that Respect had been successful in East London and Birmingham and not other areas with Muslim communities because these two areas had established anti-war movements and that Respect candidates had already become well known within that movement.

It has also been suggested that Respect's connection to religious groups and mosques has been crucial to the party's success in many areas. It attracted some controversy for allegedly being tied to the Islamic Forum of Europe (IFE), a group based at the East London Mosque in Tower Hamlets. Both The Telegraph and Dispatches have alleged that Respect activist Miah is an IFE member, although he has denied this.

== Reception ==
Respect received little attention from scholars of politics. This may be due to the perception that it was a single-issue party that provided a protest vote among a particular community. As with the Greens, Respect was recognised as having radical views but was nonetheless widely regarded as a legitimate part of politics in the UK. In this it contrasted with the pariah status accorded to contemporary far-right groups such as the British National Party (BNP). In just over two years, it had gained the electoral success that the BNP had taken twenty years to attain.

Respect was controversial within Britain's far-left movement. Far-left criticisms of the party included that it was engaging in political opportunism, that it invited the petty bourgeoisie into the socialist workers' movement, and that it focused on the narrow sectarian interests of British Muslims rather than the socio-economic issues of the working-class and in doing so neglected feminism and LGBT rights. According to Guardian journalist Dave Hill, Respect was "a case study in the British far left's enduring gift for self-parodic, self-destructive splits".

== Criticisms of Respect ==
=== Equality ===
Respect has been accused of abandoning some traditional cultural liberal issues, including women's rights, abortion and LGBT rights to attract socially conservative Muslim support. While Respect included opposition to discrimination based on gender and sexual orientation in its founding declaration, critics claim that Galloway – during the time he was a Respect MP – tended to avoid parliamentary votes involving equal rights for gay people. In a 2006 interview with PinkNews, Galloway praised New Labour's record on improving gay rights, and says of his absence from one vote that "there was never any doubt about the passage of the civil partnerships [bill], I wholly support it".

According to a resolution at that year's conference, Respect's 2005 manifesto omitted the "defence of LGBT rights despite policy adopted at last year's AGM and contained in the founding statement". A resolution was passed calling for the end to all discrimination against lesbians, gay men, bisexuals and transgender people and that this policy would be stated in all of its manifestos and principal election materials. Despite this commitment, Respect and parts of the LGBT community have clashed on several occasions. In November 2005, Respect's second largest single financial donor, Mohammad Naseem, was accused in an article by Peter Tatchell of being homophobic due to his senior position in the Islamic Party of Britain, which Tatchell claimed advocated the "banning of gay organisations" and the "execution of homosexuals". Naseem, however, stated that the Islamic Party was now little more than a think tank, and furthermore, disagreed with the statements on the Islamic Party website which Tatchell pointed to, stating his views on homosexuality as follows: "These things are a matter of personal choice [...] I am not concerned with what people do in their bedrooms." Naseem was also present at Respect's 2005 conference, where the vote to reaffirm Respect's support of LGBT rights was passed unanimously.

In January 2006, an article attacking Tatchell's opposition to the party was written by Respect member and journalist Adam Yosef. Writing for Desi Xpress, Yosef accused Tatchell of Islamophobia but was attacked by gay organisations for "encouraging violence against Tatchell" and for using "xenophobic" and "homophobic" language. Yosef also used other articles to attack same-sex unions, describing them as a front for "tax fraud". Tatchell called on Respect to expel Yosef but the party responded with the following statement: "Adam Yosef has the right to voice his own opinions in his own column – they range from an ecstatic review of Birmingham's gay pride to venting his thoughts about Peter Tatchell." However, in October 2009, Yosef pledged his formal support to Tatchell's 2010 general election parliamentary candidacy, calling for the left to "embrace a mutual personal and political commitment towards equality and human rights".

=== Antisemitism ===
Abul Hussain, a former member of Respect's national council, posted antisemitic comments on Facebook and was expelled for his comments in September 2010. The councillor joked about chopping off a Jewish person's sidelocks and confiscating their kippah. He also wrote about Jews, "Here's a penny go put it in the bank and [you] just might get a pound after ten years interest!". The Respect Party stated that "such views are demonstrably incompatible with party membership".

In 2011 Carole Swords, of Bow, the chairwoman of the Respect Party in Tower Hamlets, was convicted of a public order offence after an altercation with a Jewish counter-protester, Harvey Garfield, at a protest inside a Covent Garden Tesco Metro supermarket. She was alleged to have struck him in the face, smacking off his eyeglasses, while he was protecting Israeli goods from potentially being damaged. A subsequent appeal in December cleared her of the offence. Swords' defence team claimed Garfield had harassed and intimidated Swords inside the supermarket, and alleging he had called her a "Nazi", a "fishwife" and a "terrorist". The recorder determined that Garfield had followed Swords inside the Tesco and that she had demanded he desist. The recorder could not determine how Garfield's glasses had fallen based on the store footage, and allowed the appeal. Swords had earlier described Zionists as "cockroaches ... bugs [which] need to be stomped out" and at a different rally, Swords had told a Jewish protester to "go back to Russia".

Following Naz Kahn's appointment as Respect's women's officer in Bradford in October 2012, it emerged that Kahn had recently commented on Facebook that "history teachers in our school" were and are "the first to start brainwashing us and our children into thinking the bad guy was Hitler. What have the Jews done good in this world??" David Aaronovitch in The Jewish Chronicle wrote: "'What have the Jews done good in this world?' clearly means 'The Jews do only bad'. The Jews haven't suffered as much as they say they have, but insofar as they have suffered it's their own fault and, in any case, they have gone on to inflict equal or more suffering on others. That's 'the Jews' as a group, not 'many Jews', 'some Jews' or 'a few Jews'." Ron McKay, Galloway's spokesman, said Kahn's comments had been written shortly before she joined Respect, on an "unofficial site" (the Respect Bradford Facebook page), and that she "now deeply regrets and repudiates that posting".

The last formal leader of Respect, George Galloway, has been accused by Guardian journalist Hadley Freeman of having "said and done things that cross the line from anti-Israel to antisemitic". He threatened to sue her for the comments made on Twitter in February 2015, although the tweet had already been deleted. Her tweet followed the Question Time George Galloway in Finchley controversy, an edition of the BBC's political debate series on which Freeman's Guardian colleague Jonathan Freedland had also appeared and made similar assertions about Galloway's conduct.

Galloway's support for Hezbollah and Hamas, his refusal to debate with Israeli Jews, and his declaration of Bradford as being an "Israeli-free zone" are among the issues which have led to the attitudes of the politician being thought suspect.

== See also ==
- Respect Party election results
- Workers Party of Britain
