= Respect Renewal =

British political faction

Respect Renewal was a faction that existed during the 2007-8 split within Respect – The Unity Coalition, a UK political party.

Respect Renewal was led by Linda Smith, the National Chair, Leader and Nominating Officer of Respect, and was formed in November 2007. Its supporters included George Galloway, Ken Loach, Victoria Brittain, Salma Yaqoob and Nick Wrack.

== History ==
In September 2007, Galloway wrote a letter to Respect's national council members saying that the party was "too disorganised" and "faced oblivion" unless it reformed its internal party management. This was the beginning of a dispute within Respect between Galloway and his supporters and the Socialist Workers Party (SWP) on the other side.

On 3 November 2007, Galloway's camp announced plans to hold the Respect Renewal conference on 17 November, the same day as the planned national conference of Respect. The Respect Renewal conference was an open event and organisers claim 350 people attended, comparable with the Respect national conference, although the figure was disputed by Chris Harman in the SWP's International Socialism. This split continued with both Respect Renewal and the SWP-led faction claiming to be the real Respect. Respect Renewal, through Linda Smith, had control over the use of the Respect name in elections, while the SWP-led faction used the electoral label Left List, but did control the original Respect website. Both the Respect Renewal faction, as 'Respect (George Galloway)', and Left List stood in the 2008 London Assembly elections. Neither party won a seat or did as well as Respect did in the 2004 elections, but 'Respect (George Galloway)' outpolled Left List.

The split was finally resolved in October 2008, when the Left List ended its claim on the Respect name.

== Criticisms of Respect Renewal ==
The SWP has attributed the split within Respect to a shift to the right by George Galloway and his allies, motivated by electoralism (placing election-winning above other principles). This, according to the SWP leadership, led to attacks on the SWP as the most prominent left group in Respect. This interpretation of events is countered by Respect Renewal, which criticises the SWP for opportunism and lack of democracy.
