= Pirouz Mojtahedzadeh =

Iranian political scientist and historian (1946–2026)

- پیروز مجتهدزاده
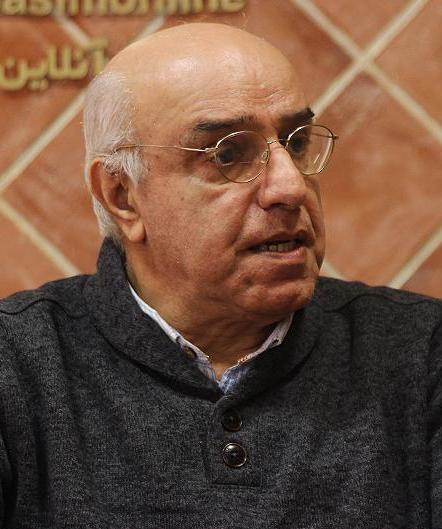
- Mojtahedzadeh in 2017
- Born: 9 February 1946; Nur, Iran
- Died: 15 October 2026 (aged 80)
- Citizenship: Iran; United Kingdom
- Education: Tehran University; London University; Manchester University; Oxford University
- Scientific career
- Fields: Iranian history
- Workplaces: Tehran University; United Nations University

Pirouz Mojtahedzadeh (Persian: پیروز مجتهدزاده; 9 February 1946 – 15 October 2026) was an Iranian political scientist and historian. He was a prominent Iranologist, geopolitics researcher, historian and political scientist. Mojtahedzadeh worked in Iranian universities as a geopolitics professor from 1999 to 2014, namely Tarbiat Modares University, University of Tehran and Shahid Beheshti University. He was fired from Tarbiat Modares University in 2014 by Revolutionary Guard Officer Yahya Rahim Safavi for expressing views in opposition to the Islamic regime. Mojtahedzadeh was an advisor of the United Nations University.

== Academic career ==
Mojtahedzadeh published more than 20 books in Persian, English and Arabic on the geopolitics of Persian Gulf region and modern discourses in international relations. Since 2004, he has been a member of the Academy of Persian Language and Literature. He was a member of the British Institute of Iranian Studies since 1993. Mojtahedzadeh earned a Ph.D. in political geography from the University of London in 1993 and a Ph.D. in political geography from the University of Oxford in 1979.

In June of 2004, Mojtahedzadeh co-authored an article with Kaveh Afrasiabi, titled "Iran's nuclear program : Threats are not the way to influence Tehran".

He was a member of Campaign Against Sanctions and Military Intervention in Iran (CASMII) UK. On 4 July 2007, he made a presentation regarding Iran's energy needs and its nuclear energy program at a conference at the European Parliament organized by the European Greens–European Free Alliance.

== Education ==
- 1967–71: University of Tehran – B.A. in human and economic geography
- 1974–76: University of Manchester – M.A. in political geography
- 1976–79: University of Oxford – D.Phil. in political geography
- 1990–93: University of London – Ph.D. in political geography

== Positions ==
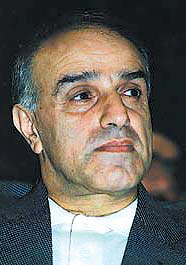
Mojtahedzadeh in 2002

- 1985–2011: Chairman: Urosevic Research Foundation of London
- 1997–1999: Visiting Professor: University of Tehran
- 1999–2026: Professor of Political Geography and Geopolitics: Tarbiat Modarres University (Tehran)
- 1986–2026: Senior Research Associate, Geopolitics & International Boundaries Research Centre, SOAS/University of London
- 1995–1996: Consultant of United Nations University
- Member of the Board, Society for contemporary Iranian Studies, University of London
- Member of the British Institute of Persian Studies, London
- 2008: a key member of Persian Gulf Studies Center

== Death ==
Mojtahedzadeh died on 15 October 2026, at the age of 80.

== Books ==
- Political Geography of the Strait of Hormuz (1991, CNMES/SOAS Occasional Paper Publication, University of London)
- The Changing World Order and the Geopolitical Regions of The Persian Gulf and Caspian - Central Asia (1992, Urosevic Foundation, London)
- The Islands of Tunb and Abu Musa (1995, CNMES/SOAS Occasional Paper Publication, University of London)
- The Amirs of Borderlands and Eastern Iranian Borders (1996, Urosevic Research Foundation, London)
- Security and Territoriality in The Persian Gulf - A Maritime Political Geography (1999 London, Curzon Press, London, and 2002 New York)
- Small Players of the Great Game (2004, Routledge/Curzon, London)
- Boundary Politics and International Boundaries of Iran (2007, Universal Publishers, USA)
- The UAE and Iranian Islands of Tunbs and Abu Musa (2007, Institute International d’ Etudes Strategique, Paris)

== See also ==
- Intellectual movements in Iran
