= Hoppy =

Hoppy or Hoppie may refer to:

== Fictional characters ==
- Hopalong Cassidy, a cowboy in novels and films
- Hoppy (The Flintstones), on the television series The Flintstones
- Hoppy, a female green frog who appears in the Nina's World episode; Nina’s Library Hop
- Hoppie Groenewald, in the 1989 novel The Power of One and the 1992 film adaptation of the same title
- Officer "Hoppy" Hopkins, a recurring character on the television show Sanford and Son
- Hoppy the Marvel Bunny, a comic book character based on Captain Marvel
- Hoppy Uniatz, a sidekick of Simon Templar, aka "The Saint"
- Flying Officer Hoppy Hopkinson, in the movie 633 Squadron
- Hoppy, in the 1994 video game ClayFighter 2: Judgment Clay
- "Hoppy" Thorne, the One-legged Wonder, one of the Manchester United F.C. mascots in the 1930s and 1940s
- Hoppy Hopscotch, a green rabbit and member of the Smiling Critters from Poppy Playtime

== People ==
- Hoppy (nickname), a list of people
- Hoppie van Jaarsveld (fl. 1949), South African rugby union player - see List of South Africa national rugby union players

== Beverage-related ==
- Hoppy (drink), a Japanese non-alcoholic beverage
- the characterization of the taste of hops, a bitter flavoring and stability agent in beer

== Other ==
- SpaceX Starhopper

== See also ==
- Hopi (disambiguation)
- Hopy, a village in Poland
