= Afrasiabi =

Afrasiab or Afrasiabi may refer to:

- Name of the mythical King Afrasiab, hero of Turan and an enemy of Iran
- Kaveh L. Afrasiabi, a political scientist and author
