= Persian Gulf Online Organization =

Organization

- Abbreviation: PGO
- Named after: Persian Gulf
- Formation: 2002; 24 years ago
- Founder: Javad Fakharzadeh, Dr.Ala
- Founded at: US
- Type: Non Governmental Organization
- Registration no.: 2989
- Legal status: Active
- Headquarters: California US
- Fields: historical, geographical studies
- Official language: English and Persian
- Board of directors: Mohammad Ala, Jived Fakharzadeh
- Website: ,

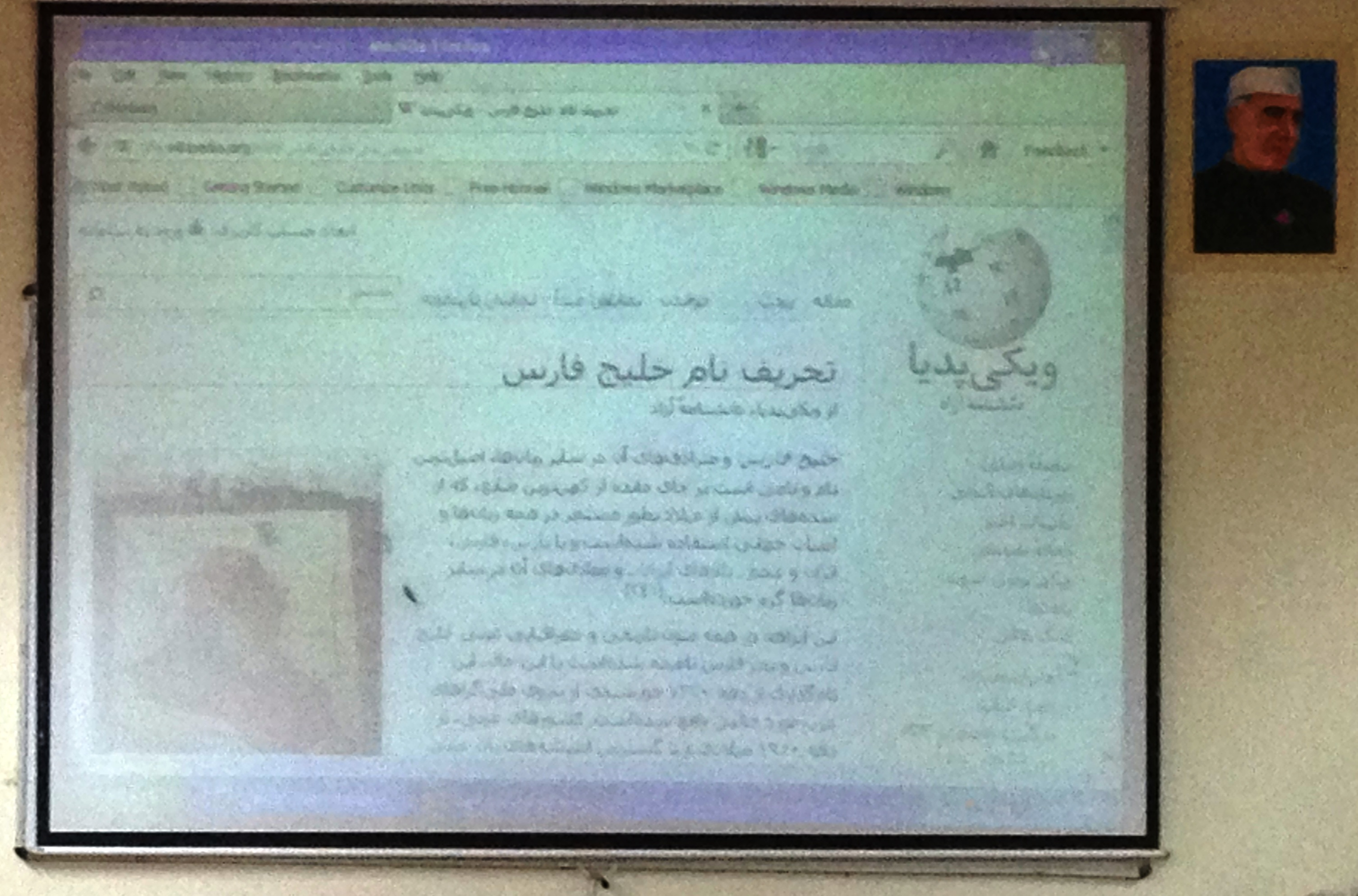
Persian Wikipedia page for the Persian Gulf

The Persian Gulf Online Organization (or Persian Gulf Organization PGO, also known as Iranians for International Cooperation (IIC)'s Persian Gulf Task Force or PGTF) is a non-governmental entity consisting of a network of volunteers across the globe dedicated to promoting the name Persian Gulf against the controversial and fictitious name "Arabian Gulf" in the Persian Gulf naming dispute. Its members live in several countries around the world.

PGO's members' efforts are mostly undertaken via the internet. On their website, current news about the Persian Gulf, maps, articles, bibliographies about the Persian Gulf, conferences, and other information can be found. Javad Fakharzadeh has written some letters to British Airways which stated that the "historically correct" name of the waters is the Persian Gulf. Two weeks later, British Airways acknowledged their mistake of using "Arabian Gulf" and provided written guarantees that their onboard displays would be corrected. PGO has sent similar letters to the Army News, and also had struggled with National Geographic about the naming of the gulf. After that, the Government of Iran became involved in such efforts too, and Iranian government agents in Europe and US contacted National Geographic, wanting to use the same name of the Persian Gulf according to its history.

In October 2018, the WIPO as an agency of the UN registered Persian Gulf in an official certificate based on the Lisbon Agreement. According to this agreement based on international law, no country, government, or organization can use another name to refer to the Persian Gulf.

== Board members ==
PGO was established in 1999 by Mohammad Ala, a Persian professor, and was represented by Pejman Akbarzadeh, another member of the organization, in Amsterdam and Tehran from 2002 to 2006. Many other notable Iranians contributed in this organization. Javad Fakharzadeh is the head and co-founder of the organization. He is also an advisory board member of CASMII. Shahram Mostarshed, an anti-war activist and a member of the Green party of California, is one them, along with another campaign organization, Iranians for International Cooperation (IIC). Daniel Pourkesali is also a board member of this organization.

== National Persian Gulf's Day ==
In 6 September 2003 a suggestion asking to dedicate a day to the Persian Gulf was posted by zeebad (Ajam), a member of PGO to the discussion panel of the PGO website the suggestion was discussed by members in different occasion and finally based on the number of votes forwarded to discussion list, and votes sent to the board members the majority of respondents chose 30 November from among 5 different days to be Persian Gulf Day. In January 2004, PGO send a letter and offered Ministry of Culture and Islamic Guidance to adopt a new national day in Iran with the name of "National Persian Gulf's Day". The government accepted the suggestion with a given priority to another day in the list of suggested days . It was approved by the government in July 2005 and since then a new national day added to official Persian calendar.

PGO had also offered the government to publish Persian Gulf stamps.

== See also ==
- Persian Gulf Studies Center
- The Sharmin and Bijan Mossavar-Rahmani Center for Iran and Persian Gulf Studies
- Persian Gulf
- Iranian Studies
- History of Iran
- Persian Gulf naming dispute
