= PGSC =

PGSC may stand for:

- Persian Gulf Service Command
- Persian Gulf Studies Center
- Supreme Court of Papua New Guinea
- Platinum Girl Scout Cookies (Cannabis Cultivar)
- Punta Gorda Sailing Club
- Pushpa Gujral Science City, Kapurthala
