= Piekiełko =

Piekiełko may refer to the following places:

- Piekiełko, Lesser Poland Voivodeship (south Poland)
- Piekiełko, Masovian Voivodeship (east-central Poland)
- Piekiełko, Mława, a former village, now part of the town of Mława in Masovian Voivodeship
- Piekiełko, Gmina Przodkowo in Pomeranian Voivodeship (north Poland)
- Piekiełko, Gmina Sierakowice in Pomeranian Voivodeship (north Poland)
