= Amy Malek =

American professor, sociocultural anthropologist, department chair

- Born: c. 1979/1980; United States
- Education: Emory University, New York University, University of California, Los Angeles
- Occupations: Chair and Director of a university department, assistant professor, scholar, sociocultural anthropologist
- Known for: Iranian Diaspora Studies
- Website: http://www.amymalek.com/

Amy Malek (born c. 1979/1980), is an Iranian-American assistant professor, scholar, and sociocultural anthropologist. She serves as the endowed chair and Director in Iranian and Persian Gulf Studies (IPGS) at Oklahoma State University, Stillwater. Her work focuses on the migration, citizenship, memory, and culture in the Iranian diaspora. Malek is an Iranian-American.

== Education and career ==
"...[first- and second-generation Iranian Americans are] alternately included and excluded in the only home one has known, while also feeling attachments to a place one may never have experienced and may or may not be welcome even to visit."

— Amy Malek, from My Shadow Is My Skin: Voices From the Iranian Diaspora (University of Texas Press, 2020)

Malek has a bachelor's degree (2003) from Emory University; and a Master of Arts degree (2005) in Near Eastern studies from New York University. She holds a Ph.D. (2015) in anthropology from the University of California, Los Angeles (UCLA). While attending UCLA, she took an interest in studying the second generation of Iranian immigrants.

From 2016 to 2022, she was an assistant professor of international studies at the College of Charleston. From 2019 to 2021, Malek was an associate research scholar at Princeton University’s Sharmin and Bijan Mossavar-Rahmani Center for Iran and Persian Gulf Studies. In the Fall of 2022, she joined Oklahoma State University, Stillwater.

== Publications ==
- Malek, Amy (September 1, 2006). "Memoir as Iranian exile cultural production: A case study of Marjane Satrapi's Persepolis series". Iranian Studies. 39 (3). Taylor & Francis, Ltd.: 353–380. doi:10.1080/00210860600808201. JSTOR 4311834. S2CID 161807564.
- Malek, Amy (2011). "Public performances of identity negotiation in the Iranian diaspora: the New York Persian Day Parade". Comparative Studies of South Asia, Africa and the Middle East. 31 (2). Duke University Press: 388–410. doi:10.1215/1089201X-1264316. S2CID 145683784.
- Malek, Amy (June 5, 2012). "Persian Dispersion, A Discussion Of the Effect Of Iranians on Los Angeles-and Angelenos On Iran". Zocalo Public Square.
- Malek, Amy (2015). "Claiming Space Documenting Second-generation Iranian Americans in Los Angeles". Anthropology of the Middle East. 10 (2): 16–45. doi:10.3167/ame.2015.100203.
- Malek, Amy (Winter 2019). "Paradoxes of Dual Nationality: Geopolitical Constraints on Multiple Citizenship in the Iranian Diaspora". The Middle East Journal. 73 (4). Middle East Institute: 531–534. doi:10.3751/73.4.11. S2CID 213776999.
- Malek, Amy (January 9, 2020). "Malek: For Iran's diaspora, plane crash brings grief across oceans and borders". Ottawa Citizen. Postmedia Network Inc.
- Malek, Amy (16 March 2020). "Negotiating Memories". In Whitney, Katherine; Emery, Leila (eds.). My Shadow Is My Skin: Voices From the Iranian Diaspora. Austin, TX: University of Texas Press (published March 16, 2020). pp. 102–111. ISBN 9781477320273.
- Malek, Amy (September 12, 2020). "Clickbait orientalism and vintage Iranian snapshots". International Journal of Cultural Studies. 24 (2): 266–289. doi:10.1177/1367877920957348. S2CID 225005767.

== See also ==
- Iranian nationality law
