= Kłosowo =

Kłosowo may refer to the following places:

- Kłosowo, Kartuzy County in Pomeranian Voivodeship (north Poland)
- Kłosowo, Malbork County in Pomeranian Voivodeship (north Poland)
- Kłosowo, West Pomeranian Voivodeship (north-west Poland)
