= John Haldon =

British historian of Byzantine Empire

John F. Haldon
- Born: October 23, 1948 (age 77); Newcastle upon Tyne, UK
- Title: Shelby Cullom Davis '30 Professor of European History, Princeton University

Academic background
- Education: University of Birmingham (BA); LMU Munich (MA); University of Birmingham (PhD)
- Thesis: Aspects of Byzantine military administration: the Elite Corps, the Opsikion, and the Imperial Tagmata from the sixth to the ninth century (1975)
- Doctoral advisor: Anthony Bryer

Academic work
- Discipline: Byzantine History, Archaeology
- Sub-discipline: military history; historical sociology
- Institutions: University of Birmingham (1980–2005); Princeton University (2005–)
- Notable works: Byzantium in the Seventh Century: The Transformation of a Culture (1990)
- Notable ideas: Tributary mode of production
- Website: https://history.princeton.edu/people/john-haldon

John Frederick Haldon FBA (born 23 October 1948 in Newcastle upon Tyne) is a British historian, and Shelby Cullom Davis '30 Professor of European History emeritus, professor of Byzantine history and Hellenic Studies emeritus, as well as former director of the Mossavar-Rahmani Center for Iran and Persian Gulf Studies at Princeton University. He presided over the International Association of Byzantine Studies from 2016 to 2022.

== Early life and education ==
Haldon was born in Newcastle upon Tyne as a son of a coal miner from Northumberland. He has traced his interest in history back to his childhood reading of a copy of Herbert Abraham Davies's An Outline History of the World (1928) (Note: H.A. Davies was a history teacher and later headmaster at His Majesty's Quakers Yard Secondary School in Edwardsville, Merthyr Tydfil County Borough, Wales. An Outline History of the World, published by Oxford University Press, was re-edited in 1937, 1954, 1964 and 1968, and reprinted multiple times. It was described in 1929 as a "worthy follower" to H. G. Wells's 1920 The Outline of History and to Hendrik Willem van Loon's 1921 The Story of Mankind in their "new way of presenting history". In 1979, several years after its reissue as a secondary school textbook in India, Africa and Southeast Asia, it received criticism for devoting half of its space to ancient history and for its "unbalanced" focus on Western Europe.) that had been presented to his father as a student prize in 1935.

His adolescent curiosity about the army and weaponry led Haldon towards the study of military organization and state formation theory. He received his bachelor's degree in medieval and modern history from the University of Birmingham in 1970, with a thesis on "Arms, armour and tactical organisation of the Byzantine army from Maurice to Basil II". He published his first article in 1970 on the possible Byzantine crossbow equivalent. Haldon initially wanted to pursue a doctorate in the history of post-Roman Britain, but changed his field of study after his advisor departed for the University of London. He earned a master's degree in medieval Greek language, literature and art history from LMU Munich in West Germany, and studied modern Greek at the University of Athens during his PhD years. He returned to the University of Birmingham to complete his doctoral dissertation on "Aspects of Byzantine military administration: the Elite Corps, the Opsikion, and the Imperial Tagmata from the sixth to the ninth century" under the supervision of Anthony Bryer in 1975.

== Career ==
After graduating from the University of Birmingham, Haldon held a post-doctoral fellowship at the Institut für Byzantinistik of LMU Munich (1976–1979). From 1980 to 1995, he was a junior professor at the University of Birmingham. He also worked at the Max Planck Institute for European Legal History in Frankfurt for a time during the 1980s. The time spent in Munich and Frankfurt was important to his theoretical and ideological formation, and he shared his interest in the transformation of seventh- and eighth-century Byzantine state and society with his initial German collaborators, Friedhelm Winkelmann and Wolfram Brandes. While in Birmingham, he was active in the Communist Party of Great Britain alongside Chris Wickham. From 1995 to 2000, he was director of the Centre for Byzantine, Ottoman and Modern Greek Studies at the University of Birmingham. From 2000 to 2005, Haldon served as head of the School of Historical Studies at the University of Birmingham.

In 2005, he joined the faculty of Princeton University, where he was professor of Byzantine history and Hellenic studies and (from 2009) the Shelby Cullom Davis Professor of European History until his retirement in 2018. He was concurrently a senior fellow at the Dumbarton Oaks Center for Byzantine Studies in Washington, D.C. from 2007 to 2013. At Princeton, Haldon also served as the director of graduate studies for the History Department (2009–2018) and as the founding director of the Mossavar-Rahmani Center for Iran and Persian Gulf Studies (2013–2018). He was the overall director of the Avkat Archaeological Project (2006–2012, fieldwork completed by 2010) under the aegis of the British Institute at Ankara. From 2013 he has been director of the Princeton Climate Change and History Research Initiative, and since 2018 director of the Environmental History Lab for the Program in Medieval Studies.

He is the author or co-author of 14 books, including six monographs: The Empire That Would Not Die: The Paradox of Eastern Roman Survival, 640–740 (2016), Byzantium in the Iconoclast Era c. 680–850: A History (with Leslie Brubaker, 2011), Warfare, State and Society in the Byzantine World, 565–1204 (1999), The State and the Tributary Mode of Production (1993), Byzantium in the Seventh Century: The Transformation of a Culture (1990) and Byzantine Praetorians: An Administrative, Institutional and Social Survey of the Opsikion and Tagmata, c. 580–900 (1984).

His research focuses on the history of the medieval eastern Roman (Byzantine) empire, in particular in the period from the seventh to the twelfth centuries; on state systems and structures across the European and Islamic worlds from late ancient to early modern times; on the impact of environmental stress on societal resilience in premodern social systems; and on the production, distribution and consumption of resources in the late ancient and medieval world. In his 1993 book, which responded to the sociological theorising of Walter Garrison Runciman and Michael Mann, Haldon proposed to interpret all pre-capitalist class systems in human history through the concept of a single "tributary mode of production". By 2010, he regarded Runciman's neo-Darwinian framework favourably.

== Awards and honors ==
- Fellow of the British Academy (2021)
- Member, Archaeological Institute of America
- Member, British Institute at Ankara
- President of the International Association of Byzantine Studies (AIEB) 2016–2022
- Corresponding Member of the Austrian Academy of Sciences in Vienna (2010)
- External member, Accademia Nazionale dei Lincei, Rome (2024)

== Selected bibliography ==
=== Books authored ===
- Recruitment and Conscription in the Byzantine Army c. 550–950: A Study on the Origins of the stratiotika ktemata, Vienna: Österreichische Akademie der Wissenschaften, 1979
- Byzantine Praetorians: An Administrative, Institutional and Social Survey of the Opsikion and Tagmata, c. 580–900, Bonn: Habelt, 1984
- Byzantium in the Seventh Century: The Transformation of a Culture, Cambridge: Cambridge University Press, 1990 (revised edition 1997)
- The State and the Tributary Mode of Production, London: Verso, 1993
- State, Army, and Society in Byzantium: Approaches to Military, Social, and Administrative History, 6th–12th Centuries, Brookfield, VT: Variorum, 1995
- Warfare, State and Society in the Byzantine World, 565–1204, London: UCL Press, 1999
- Byzantium: A History, Stroud: Tempus, 2000
- The Byzantine Wars: Battles and Campaigns of the Byzantine Era, Stroud: Tempus, 2001
- (with Leslie Brubaker) Byzantium in the Iconoclast Era (c.680–850): The Sources: An Annotated Survey, Aldershot: Ashgate, 2001
- Byzantium at War, AD 600–1453, Oxford: Osprey, 2002
- The Palgrave Atlas of Byzantine History, Basingstoke: Palgrave Macmillan, 2005
- (with Leslie Brubaker) Byzantium in the Iconoclast Era c. 680–850: A History, Cambridge: Cambridge University Press, 2011
- The Empire That Would Not Die: The Paradox of Eastern Roman Survival, 640–740, Cambridge, MA: Harvard University Press, 2016
- (with Philip Murgatroyd, Vincent Gaffney, and Georgios Theodoropoulos) Modelling the Logistics of Mantzikert, Oxford: Archaeopress, 2024

=== Editions, translations and commentaries of primary sources ===
- Constantine VII Porphyrogenitus, Three Treatises on Imperial Military Expeditions, Vienna: Österreichische Akademie der Wissenschaften, 1990
- A Critical Commentary on the Taktika of Leo VI, Washington, DC: Dumbarton Oaks Research Library and Collection, 2014
- A Tale of Two Saints: The Martyrdoms and Miracles of Saints Theodore ‘the Recruit’ and ‘the General’, Liverpool: Liverpool University Press, 2016
- The De Thematibus (‘on the themes’) of Constantine VII Porphyrogenitus, Liverpool: Liverpool University Press, 2021

=== Edited volumes ===
- (with Lawrence Conrad) Elites Old and New in the Byzantine and Early Islamic Near East: Papers of the Sixth Workshop on Late Antiquity and Early Islam, Princeton, NJ: Darwin Press, 2004
- General Issues in the Study of Medieval Logistics: Sources, Problems, and Methodologies, Leiden: Brill, 2006
- (with Elizabeth Jeffreys and Robin Cormack) The Oxford Handbook of Byzantine Studies, Oxford: Oxford University Press, 2008
- The Social History of Byzantium, Chichester: Wiley-Blackwell, 2009
- Money, Power and Politics in Early Islamic Syria: A Review of Current Debates, Farnham: Ashgate, 2010
- (with Hugh Elton and James Newhard), Archaeology and Urban Settlement in Late Roman and Byzantine Anatolia: Euchaïta-Avkat-Beyözü and Its Environment, Cambridge: Cambridge University Press, 2018

== Bibliography ==
- Cameron, Averil (2024), "John Haldon – From Birmingham (England) to Princeton", in Brandes, Wolfram; Reimitz, Helmut; Tannous, Jack (eds.), Legal Pluralism and Social Change in Late Antiquity and the Middle Ages: A Conference in Honor of John Haldon, Frankfurt am Main: Vittorio Klostermann, pp. 1–18, doi:10.5771/9783465145509, ISBN 978-3-465-04550-2
