= Pomieczyno Małe =

- Village
- Location within Poland
- Coordinates: 54°25′13″N 18°13′02″E
- Country: Poland
- Voivodeship: Pomeranian
- County: Kartuzy
- Gmina: Przodkowo
- Population: 83

Pomieczyno Małe [pɔmjɛˈt͡ʂɨnɔ ˈmawɛ] is a village in the administrative district of Gmina Przodkowo, within Kartuzy County, Pomeranian Voivodeship, in northern Poland.

Up until 1998, Pomieczyno belonged to the Gdansk Voivodeship.

== See also ==
- History of Pomerania
