= Abbas Edalat =

Iranian computer scientist

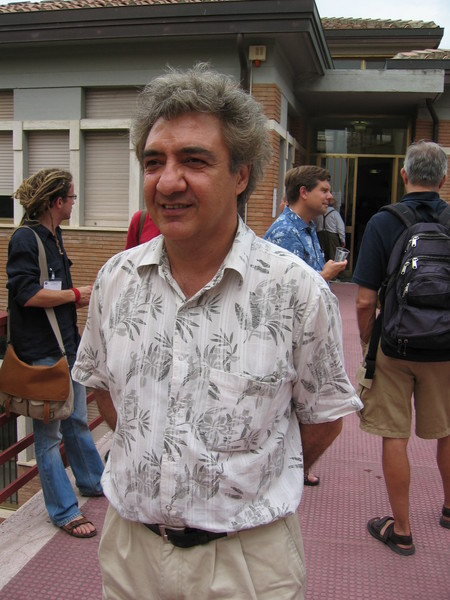
- Born: Iran
- Education: UC Berkeley; University of Warwick
- Known for: CASMII, SAF
- Scientific career
- Fields: Computer Science, Mathematics
- Workplaces: Imperial College London; Sharif University of Technology; Institute for Research in Fundamental Sciences
- Website: imperial college http://www.doc.ic.ac.uk/~ae/

Abbas Edalat (Persian: عباس عدالت) is a British-Iranian academic who is a professor of computer science and mathematics at the Department of Computing, Imperial College London and a political activist. In a 2018 letter to The Guardian, 129 experts in computer science, mathematics and machine learning described him as "a prominent academic, making fundamental contributions to mathematical logic and theoretical computer science" Edalat also founded SAF and CASMII, a campaign against sanctions and military intervention in Iran.

Edalat has appeared on BBC News on numerous occasions.

== Academic career ==
Edalat is Professor of Computer Science and Mathematics at Imperial College, London, since 1997. Before this he was a lecturer in the Department of Mathematical Sciences at Sharif University of Technology, Tehran (1987–88). He completed his PhD in Mathematics at Warwick University (UK) in 1985 advised by Christopher Zeeman. His research interests include Exact Computation in Differential and Integral Calculus, Computational Geometry, Computation in Logical Form, Optimisation Theory, Game Theory and Computational Psychiatry.

At Imperial College, Professor Edalat serves as the head of both the Algorithmic Human Development and Continuous Data-Types and Exact Computing research groups. His 1997 paper on "Bisimulation for Labelled Markov Processes" received the IEEE LICS Test of Time Award in 2017.

== Science and Arts Foundation ==
In 1999, Edalat founded the Science and Arts Foundation (SAF), a UK registered charity with the mission "to provide the youth of the developing world with educational opportunities particularly in information technology and internet enjoyed in the industrial world." The foundation's president was Dr. Mohammad Reza Haeri-Yazdi, faculty member of the University of Tehran. The foundation raised over US$1 million toward technology projects in Iranian middle and high schools, in partnership with institutions of higher learning, such as Sharif University of Technology, University of Guilan, Shahid Chamran University and University of Kashan. According to Fars News, SAF "established the first modern computer sites with internet access for some 250 schools in various provinces in Iran."

== Campaign Against Sanctions and Military Intervention in Iran (CASMII) ==
Edalat founded the educational peace organization CASMII, on 1 December 2005 in London, UK. It expanded to the US the following year. The organization's membership is described as a group of academics, students and professionals of "diverse range of political and ideological viewpoints", formed to oppose sanctions or military action against Iran. Edalat and CASMII have been involved in numerous anti-war events, news programs and speaking engagements.

== Personal life ==
Edalat was arrested in Tehran on 15 April 2018 by officers of the intelligence department of IRGC for unknown reasons. He was transferred to Evin Prison. Edalat had come to Iran to attend educational workshops. He returned to the UK in December 2018.

== See also ==
- CASMII
- Sanctions against Iran
- Anti-Iranianism
- List of foreign nationals detained in Iran
