= Kczewo, Kartuzy County =

Kczewo
- Village
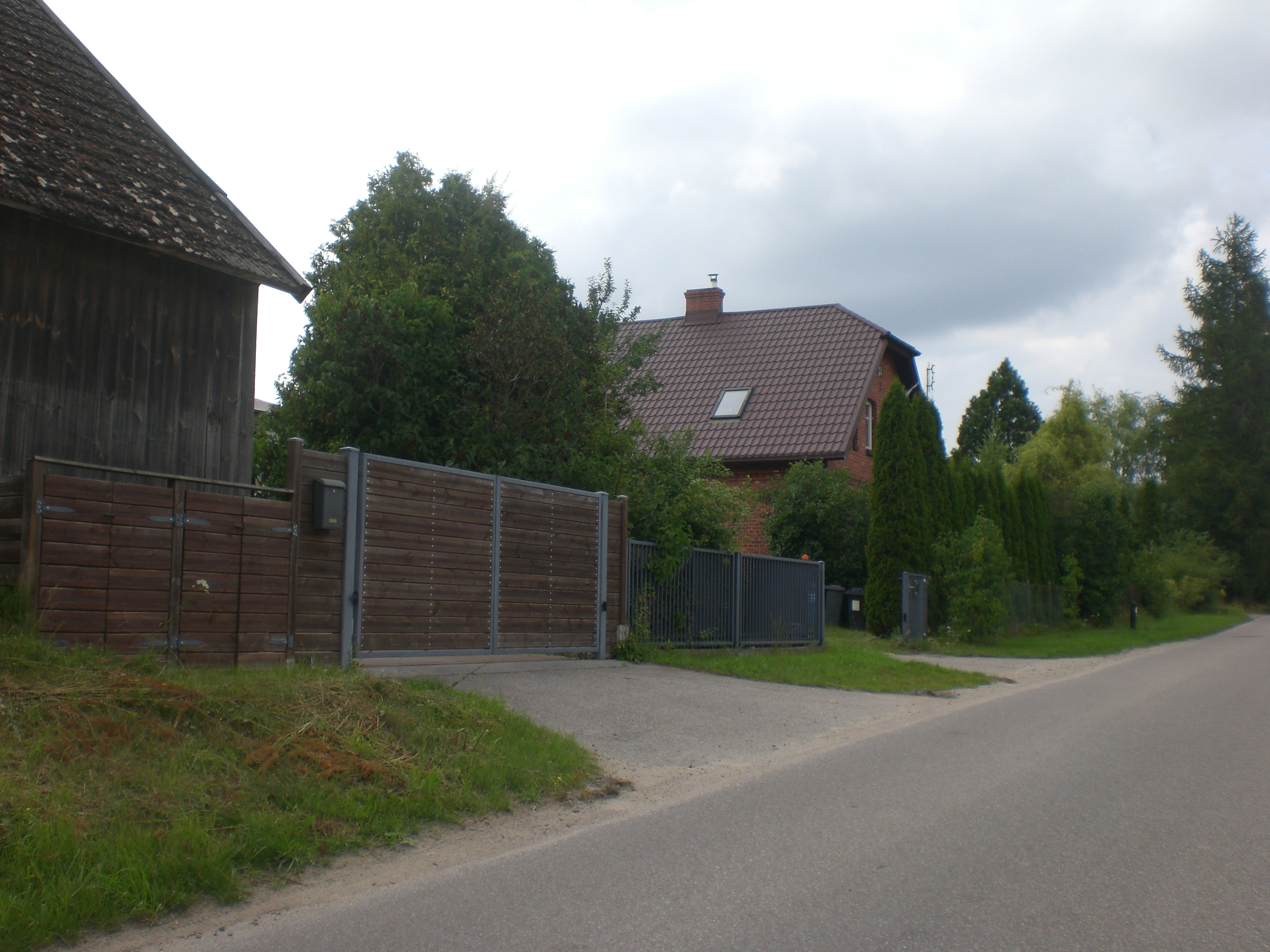

- Location within Poland
- Coordinates: 54°23′N 18°20′E
- Country: Poland
- Voivodeship: Pomeranian
- County: Kartuzy
- Gmina: Przodkowo

Population
  - Total: 657
- Time zone: UTC+1 (CET)
  - Summer (DST): UTC+2 (CEST)
- Vehicle registration: GKA

Kczewo [ˈkt͡ʂɛvɔ] is a village in the administrative district of Gmina Przodkowo, within Kartuzy County, Pomeranian Voivodeship, in northern Poland. It is located in the ethnocultural region of Kashubia in the historical region of Pomerania.

== History ==
Kczewo was a private village of Polish nobility, including the Kczewski family, administratively located in the Gdańsk County in the Pomeranian Voivodeship of the Kingdom of Poland.
