= Tokary, Pomeranian Voivodeship =

Tokary
- Village
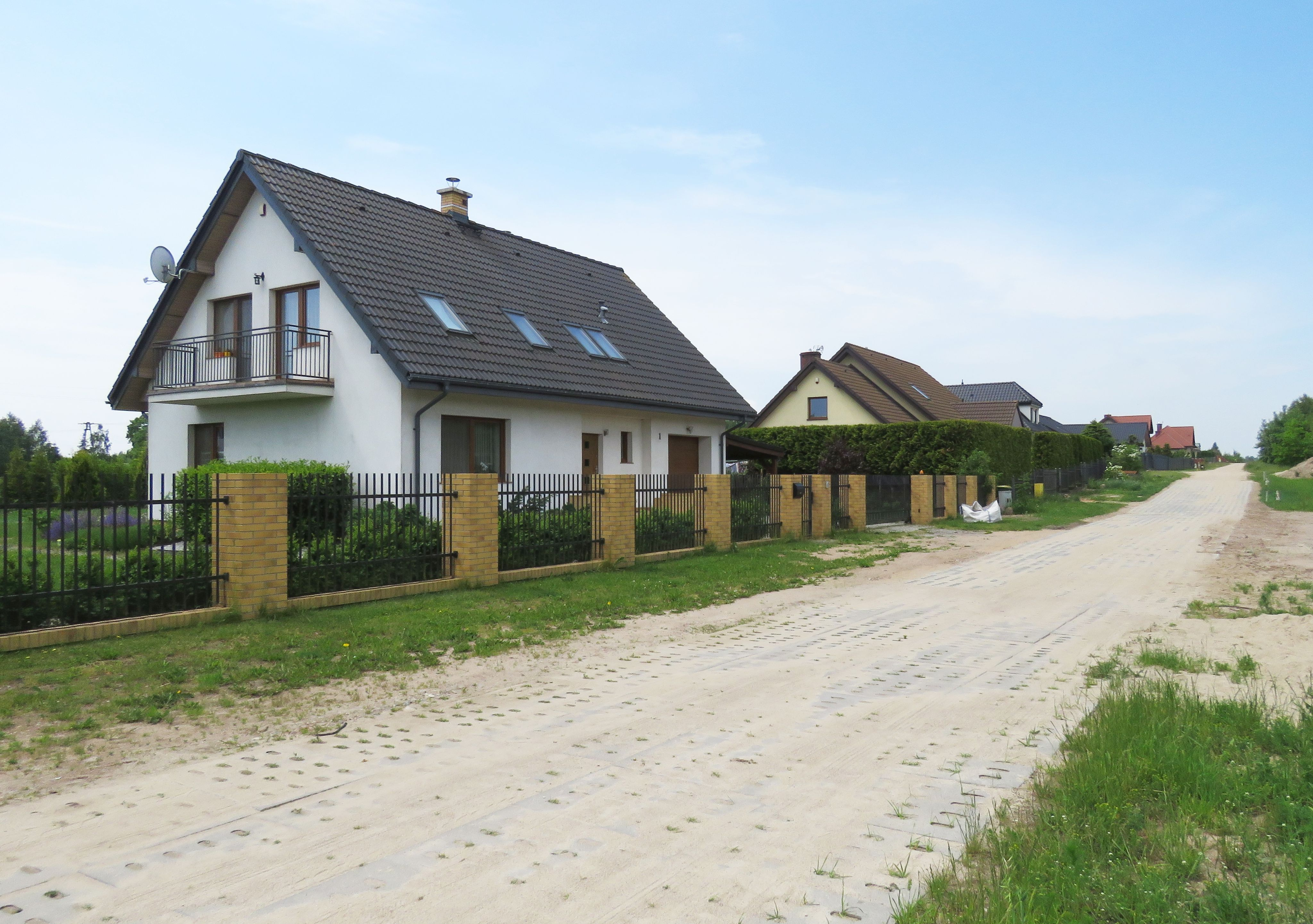

- Location within Poland
- Coordinates: 54°25′N 18°20′E
- Country: Poland
- Voivodeship: Pomeranian
- County: Kartuzy
- Gmina: Przodkowo

Population
  - Total: 349
- Time zone: UTC+1 (CET)
  - Summer (DST): UTC+2 (CEST)

Tokary [tɔˈkarɨ] is a village in the administrative district of Gmina Przodkowo, within Kartuzy County, Pomeranian Voivodeship, in northern Poland.

== History ==
It was a private village, administratively located in the Gdańsk County in the Pomeranian Voivodeship of the Kingdom of Poland.
