= Osowa Góra, Pomeranian Voivodeship =

Osowa Góra
- Village
- Location within Poland
- Coordinates: 54°22′1″N 18°15′9″E
- Country: Poland
- Voivodeship: Pomeranian
- County: Kartuzy
- Gmina: Przodkowo

Osowa Góra [ɔˈsɔva ˈɡura] is a village in the administrative district of Gmina Przodkowo, within Kartuzy County, Pomeranian Voivodeship, in northern Poland.

For details of the history of the region, see History of Pomerania.
