= Hopi (disambiguation) =

Hopi are a Native American people.

Hopi may also refer to:

- Hopi language, Uto-Aztecan language spoken by the Hopi people
- Hopi (missile), a nuclear air-to-surface missile developed by the U.S. Navy in the 1950s
- 2938 Hopi, main-belt asteroid
- Hebi, also spelled as Hopi, city in Henan, China
- Hands Off the People of Iran, or HOPI, a British organisation

== See also ==
- Hopi Reservation, Native American reservation for the Hopi and Arizona Tewa people
- Hopi-Dart, a sounding rocket
