= Krzywda, Pomeranian Voivodeship =

Krzywda
- Village
- Location within Poland
- Coordinates: 54°22′28″N 18°15′11″E
- Country: Poland
- Voivodeship: Pomeranian
- County: Kartuzy
- Gmina: Przodkowo

Krzywda [ˈkʂɨvda] is a village in the administrative district of Gmina Przodkowo, within Kartuzy County, Pomeranian Voivodeship, in northern Poland.

For details of the history of the region, see History of Pomerania.
