= Hillel Ticktin =

Hillel H. Ticktin (born 1937) is a British Marxist theorist and economist. He was born in the Union of South Africa, but had to leave to avoid arrest for political activism. He then lived and studied in the Soviet Union, where his PhD thesis, which was critical of official Communist Parties, was rejected. In 1965 he began teaching at Glasgow University, which in 2000 appointed him professor of Marxist studies. He retired in 2002.

In 1973, he co-founded Critique, a Journal of Socialist Theory.

He is an honorary senior research fellow in social sciences administration, and an honorary professorial research fellow in the School of Social and Political Sciences at Glasgow University.
