= Campaign Against Sanctions and Military Intervention in Iran =

Campaign Against Sanctions and Military Intervention in Iran (CASMII) is a group of academics, students and professionals of Iranian and non-Iranian backgrounds formed to oppose sanctions or military action against Iran by the United States.

== History ==
CASMII was founded on 1 December 2005 in London by Professor Abbas Edalat, and describes itself as independent of all political groups and governments (in particular the Iranian government), and adheres to no particular religion or ideology. Core values include respect for human rights and a democratic state, in particular freedom of expression, freedom of press, an independent judiciary, equal rights for women, ethnic and religious minorities in Iran.

On 6 November 2006, the United Kingdom branch of CASMII joined with Action Iran and Iran Solidarity, forming a new organisation in the UK called Campaign Iran, which remains part of CASMII international.

CASMII has been criticised by Hands Off the People of Iran as being supportive of the Iranian reform movement and opposed to the interests of "workers, progressives and democrats".

Members of the CASMII Board include academics such as Professor Udo Steinbach, who was the head of the Near East Department of the German Institute for International and Security Affairs from 1971 to 1974 and director of the Deutschen Orient-Instituts (which merged into the German Institute of Global and Area Studies) from 1976 to 2006. The human rights and social justice advocacy group Global Exchange recommends CASMII members Foaad Khosmood and Alex Patico as public speakers on anti-war topics related to Iran.

In the US, CASMII is governed by a board of directors. CASMII has an international board of editors as well as an advisory board. Among the members of its advisory board are Dr. Behrad Nakhai, an Iranian nuclear engineer who worked as a research scientist at Oak Ridge National Laboratory and is currently conducting Nuclear Safety Analysis, and Kaveh L. Afrasiabi, a political scientist and author of Iranian origin.

== Actions ==
The group's campaign methods include participation in media, holding public meetings, lobbying members of parliaments, international campaigning and cooperation with all groups sharing similar aims. Radio Free Europe/Radio Liberty described CASMII as "a strong opponent to sanctions" against Iran.

=== Public talks ===
In November 2006, the group participated in a multi-state "Tour for a Just Foreign Policy" which was a series of speaking engagements as well as photographic displays throughout the Northeastern USA. On 4 July 2007, Prof. Pirouz Mojtahedzadeh of CASMII UK made a presentation regarding Iran's energy needs and its nuclear energy program at a conference at the European Parliament organised by the European Greens–European Free Alliance.

=== Action Iran ===
On 6 February 2006, Action Iran participated in a Campaign for Nuclear Disarmament demonstration outside of the headquarters of the BBC, claiming that the BBC presented biased reporting regarding Iran by not reporting alleged violations by nuclear weapons states of Article VI of the Nuclear Non-Proliferation Treaty.

On 10 June 2006, Elaheh Rostami Povey represented Action Iran at the Stop the War Coalition's "Fifth Annual Stop The War Conference".

On 6 September 2006, an Action Iran spokesperson took part in a rally in Manchester promoting a rally called "Time To Go" advocating the resignation of British prime minister Tony Blair and later in the month, Action Iran together with CASMII organised a public rally with Hans von Sponeck, the United Nations Humanitarian Coordinator for Iraq after Denis Halliday resigned from that post,

=== Street actions ===
In February 2007, CASMII carried banners and signs opposing war with Iran, as part of a demonstration of 100,000 people in Washington, D.C. in protest against the US government's relations with Iraq and Iran.

=== Reaction to UN Security Council Resolution 1737 ===
In reaction to United Nations Security Council Resolution 1737, CASMII issued a statement titled "A Terrible Day for International Diplomacy" dated 24 December 2006. In the statement CASMII expresses grave concern over the UN resolution.

=== Letter actions and advertisements ===
In an action initiated by Physicians for Social Responsibility in February 2007, CASMII co-sponsored a full page advertisement in a Washington, D.C. journal, the Congressional Quarterly, opposing an attack against Iran.

In October 2007, CASMII together with the National Iranian American Council and some other organisations sent a letter to the political leaders of the United States, the United Kingdom and Iran opposing military actions and appealing to the governments "to set aside all pre-conditions and resume direct and open negotiations on all issues of dispute, ..."

=== Media analyses, debates ===
In mid-2006, CASMII debated anti-war strategies with a group of peace activists (including Michael Albert, Noam Chomsky, Michael Lerner (rabbi) and Howard Zinn) associated with the generally left perspective media group Z Communications.

In early May 2007, the BBC apologised to CASMII for having used the words "abducted" and "hostages" in relation to the 2007 Iranian arrest of Royal Navy personnel. CASMII member Abbas Edalat was not satisfied with the apology, stating "We do not accept that because a story is at an 'early stage' misleading reports are therefore acceptable. The BBC has a code of practice and is very aware of the power of language. Using the word 'abducted' instead of 'captured' and the word 'hostages' instead of 'detainees' is a clear example of linguistic manipulation of the facts and there are no excuses for it."

In May 2007, the British media analysis group Media Lens pointed to an article by a Guardian journalist Simon Tisdall discussing alleged plans by Iran to fight against United States soldiers in Iraq. Media Lens asserted that the article was mostly based on anonymous official sources from the United States government. CASMII in turn complained to The Guardian about the article. CASMII member Abbas Edalat stated, " The Guardian has reported, without any challenge or any critical analysis, highly incriminating but unfounded and unsubstantiated statements by an unnamed US official in such a way that they appear to the reader as facts."

== See also ==
- Sanctions against Iran
- Anti-Iranianism
- The UN Security Council and the Iraq war
- United Nations Security Council Resolution 1747
