= Pomieczyno =

- Village
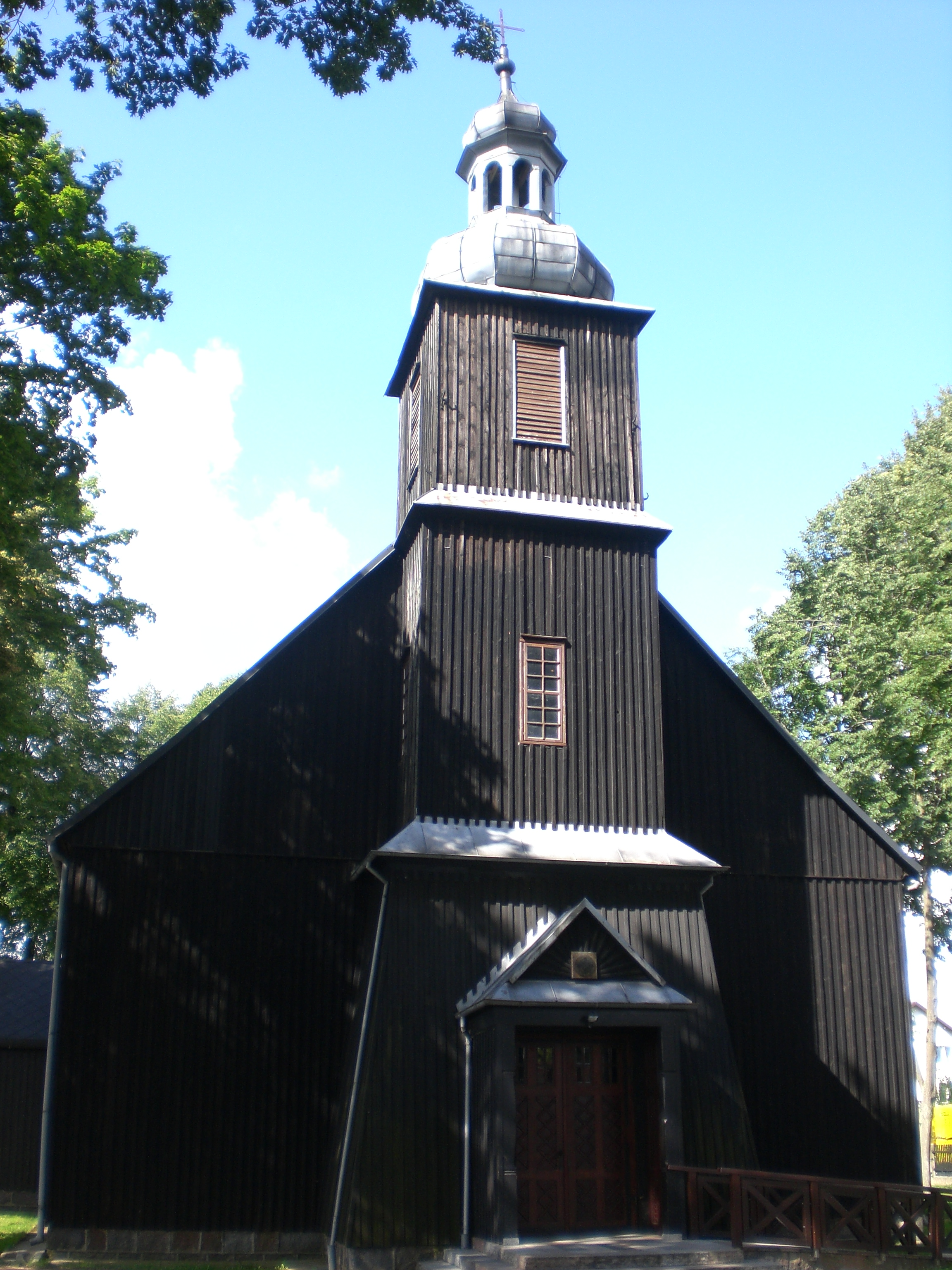
- Saint Joseph church in Pomieczyno

- Location within Poland
- Coordinates: 54°24′53″N 18°12′7″E
- Country: Poland
- Voivodeship: Pomeranian
- County: Kartuzy
- Gmina: Przodkowo
- Population: 450
- Time zone: UTC+1 (CET)
  - Summer (DST): UTC+2 (CEST)
- Vehicle registration: GKA

Pomieczyno [pɔmʲɛˈt͡ʂɨnɔ] (German: Pomietschin) is a village in the administrative district of Gmina Przodkowo, within Kartuzy County, Pomeranian Voivodeship, in northern Poland. It is located in the ethnocultural region of Kashubia in the historic region of Pomerania.

== History ==
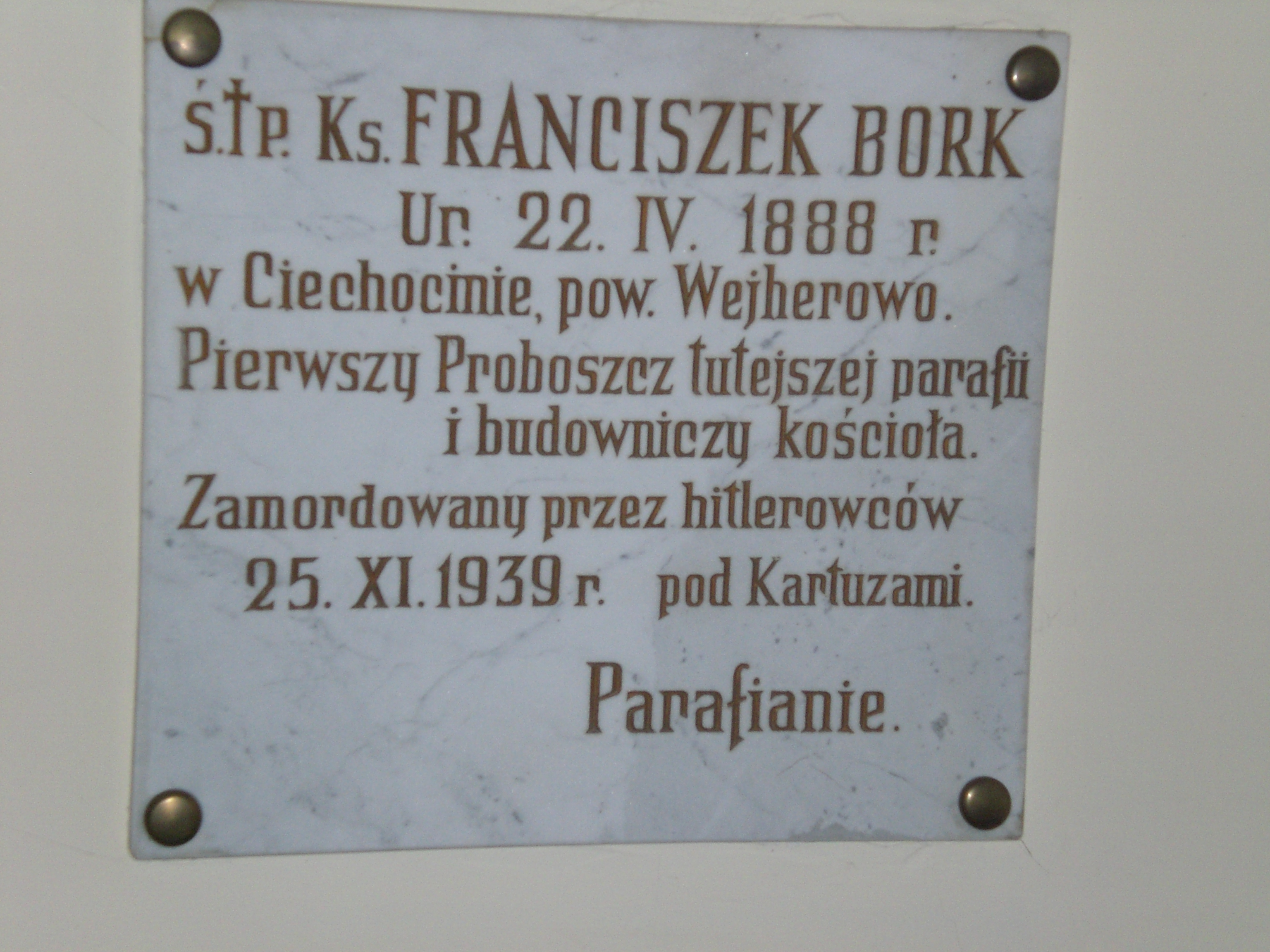
Memorial plaque to Franciszek Bork, local Polish priest murdered by the Germans in 1939

During the German occupation of Poland (World War II), Pomieczyno was one of the sites of executions of Poles, carried out by the Germans in 1939 as part of the Intelligenzaktion. Local priest Franciszek Bork was murdered during a massacre of Polish priests from the region perpetrated by the Einsatzkommando 16 in November 1939 in the forest near Kartuzy (see: Nazi persecution of the Catholic Church in Poland). In February 1942, the German police and SS carried out expulsions of Poles, whose houses were then handed over to new German colonists as part of the Lebensraum policy. Expelled Poles were deported in freight trains to the camp in Jabłonowo-Zamek and the Potulice concentration camp, and eventually enslaved as forced labour of new German colonists, both in the vicinity of Pomieczyno and near Grudziądz.
