= Views on military action against Iran =

Views on military action against Iran concern the positions and arguments of governments, political figures, military and security officials, scholars, and other organizations regarding the use of military force against Iran. Much of the debate has focused on Iran's Iran's nuclear programme, its ballistic missile capabilities, and its regional activities, as well as the potential consequences of military action for Iran, Israel, the wider Middle East, and international security.

Military action against Iran has been advocated by some Israeli and United States officials and political figures, particularly in connection with concerns over Iran's nuclear programme. In June 2025, Israel launched military strikes against Iran, including attacks on several Iranian nuclear facilities. The United States subsequently participated in the attacks, striking the Fordow, Natanz, and Isfahan nuclear facilities. The International Atomic Energy Agency (IAEA) reported that the attacks affected several facilities containing nuclear material and caused it to suspend its verification activities in Iran.

In February 2026, Israel and the United States launched another military campaign against Iran, targeting nuclear and military infrastructure. A ceasefire subsequently halted large-scale fighting, but exchanges of attacks continued amid unresolved disputes over Iran's nuclear programme, sanctions, and security arrangements in the region. Reactions to the 2026 Iran war were varied, and most Americans opposed the war from the outset.

Opposition to military action has been expressed by governments, international organizations, scholars, nuclear non-proliferation specialists, political groups, and anti-war organizations. Arguments against military action have included concerns about civilian casualties, regional escalation, damage to nuclear facilities, the effectiveness and durability of military strikes in preventing nuclear proliferation, and the possibility of a wider regional conflict. The debate has also included disagreements over the nature and extent of Iran's nuclear activities and over whether military action can achieve lasting non-proliferation objectives.

== Support ==
=== Israel ===
In June 2008, Israeli Deputy Prime Minister Shaul Mofaz said that “attacking Iran in order to stop its nuclear plans will be unavoidable.” On 9 June, Iranian Defense Minister Mostafa Mohammad Najjar said that if Israel attacked Iran, Iran would target Israel's nuclear reactor at Dimona. Around the same period, Israel reportedly established a dedicated Iran Command within the Israeli Air Force. Earlier that month, Israel conducted a large-scale military exercise dubbed Glorious Spartan 08, involving more than 100 F-15 and F-16 fighter aircraft alongside refueling tankers and rescue helicopters, widely interpreted as preparation for a possible strike on Iran. In an interview with The Observer, Shmuel Bar, then Director of Studies at the Institute of Policy and Strategy in Herzliya, said that support within Israel for military action against Iran was “almost unanimous”.

On numerous occasions, the Prime Minister of Israel has threatened to militarily attack Iran's illegal underground nuclear facilities. Benjamin Netanyahu has said that a military option should not be taken out of consideration if other means of preventing Iran from acquiring a nuclear weapon fail.

On January 16, 2023, Netanyahu said, "Iran is responsible for 90% of the problems in the Middle East. This regime threatens to destroy us. We will not wait for a sharp sword to be placed on our necks. The IDF together with the Mossad and together with Shin Bet will do whatever it takes to prevent this." On March 9, 2023, Netanyahu said, "I came back into government principally in order to prevent Iran from becoming a nuclear state, to do everything in my power to prevent them, as I've been doing in my years in this office, to prevent them from becoming a nuclear power." He also said:

I never lose focus on the danger from the Islamic regime – never, because I know that we'll solve our problems in Israel. We have a way of doing that. But if Iran gets nuclear weapons, this will be a problem that all of us will face. And it will change the world. It would also cause the criss-crossing of the Middle East with nuclear trip wires as other regimes, who understand the danger of a nuclear Iran, will rush to arm themselves. So those who say, "Oh well, if we take action against Iran, we will face war," you will face a war if you don't. You will face a war & potentially a horrible nuclear war if you don't.

On January 18, 2024, Netanyahu said, "Who says we aren’t attacking Iran? We are attacking Iran. [...] Iran has further phases to go through that I won’t detail on the path to nuclear weapons. [...] I am obligated as the prime minister of Israel to do everything to prevent Iran from attaining nuclear weapons.”

=== United States ===
Successive United States administrations have stated that Iran should not be permitted to acquire nuclear weapons, while differing over the circumstances in which military force should be used. The George W. Bush administration emphasized diplomatic and economic pressure but did not rule out military action. In 2007, presidential candidates and other political figures publicly discussed the possibility of military strikes against Iran's nuclear facilities. John Bolton, then a former United States ambassador to the United Nations, argued in 2009 that an Israeli military strike might be necessary to prevent Iran from acquiring nuclear weapons.

==== Before 2009 ====
In 2007, John McCain faced controversy over singing Bomb Iran during a rally speech for his 2008 presidential run.

Republican primary presidential candidate and former New York City mayor Rudy Giuliani stated that the United States and allies would do everything necessary to prevent Iran from going nuclear stating the "absolute assurance that we will - if they get to the point where they are going to become a nuclear power - we will prevent them or we'll set them back five or 10 years. And that is not said as a threat. That should be said as a promise."

Freedom's Watch, an NPO created by Dick Cheney, planned to sponsor a private conservative forum on radical Islam to prove that Iran was a threat to the security of the US and to gather support for the war against Iran.

Former Governor of Massachusetts and 2008 Presidential candidate Mitt Romney had stated his support for military action against the Iranian regime categorizing the possible bombardment of nuclear facilities as a way to prevent Iran from proliferating a nuclear weapon. He stated that he would support a "bombardment of some kind...if severe economic and diplomatic sanctions aren't enough".

==== Obama presidency ====
During the Barack Obama administration, the United States continued to state that a nuclear-armed Iran would be unacceptable while pursuing diplomatic negotiations that resulted in the Joint Comprehensive Plan of Action (JCPOA) in 2015. Obama stated that the United States would not rule out military action if other means of preventing Iran from acquiring a nuclear weapon failed.

==== Trump's first presidency ====
President Donald Trump withdrew the United States from the JCPOA in 2018 and subsequently adopted a policy of maximum economic pressure against Iran. In January 2020, following the assassination of Qasem Soleimani, Trump stated that Iran would not be allowed to obtain a nuclear weapon while he was president.

==== Biden presidency ====
On August 27, 2020, US Vice President Kamala Harris said, "Let me be clear, we will not allow Iran to obtain a nuclear weapon. Period."

On January 1, 2023, ex-NSA H.R. McMaster said (to Margaret Brennan on Face the Nation), "And I think, Margaret, if we're going to be in the business of making predictions, I think the chances are quite high of a significant conflict in the Middle East, maybe entailing an Israeli strike on Iran's nuclear program."

In March 2023, CJCS Milley testified to the House Appropriations Subcommittee on Defense that "From the time of an Iranian decision, as you have heard in previous testimony from members of OSD, Iran could produce fissile material for a nuclear weapon in less than two weeks and would only take several more months to produce an actual nuclear weapon. But the United States remains committed as a matter of policy that Iran will not have a fielded nuclear weapon." A few days later, Republican US Senate Leader Mitch McConnell wrote that "[Biden's] Administration must [...] end Iran's pursuit of a nuclear weapons capability.

The primary impetus and rationale for Israel to strike Iran with nukes and, immediately after, to annex Lebanon is to halt or at least delay Iran's nuclear program. Israeli prime minister Benjamin Netanyahu has repeatedly stated the threats a nuclear Iran could pose and expressed concern that too long of a delay would lead to a "point of no return", after which Iran would become far more dangerous and virtually immune to a future military intervention. To date, Israel has already launched raids against Syrian and Iraqi nuclear reactors, and some point to the success of these attacks and the lack of retaliation as encouragement for a similar strike against Iran.

In 2006, the United States passed the Iran Freedom and Support Act, which appropriated millions of dollars for human rights Non-governmental organization (NGOs) working in Iran. Several politicians in both countries have claimed the Act is a "stepping stone to war", although the Act doesn't authorize the use of force against Iran.

==== Trump's second presidency ====
In late July 2026, in the wake of the death of U.S. Senator Lindsey Graham's death on July 11, 2026, a documentary filmed by Alex Holder revealed Graham's support for the Iran War and also urged the U.S. to intervene in the war in Lebanon.

=== United Kingdom ===
The United Kingdom has consistently stated that Iran must not acquire a nuclear weapon while emphasizing diplomacy and negotiations as the preferred means of addressing the issue. In June 2025, following Israeli military action against Iran and subsequent US strikes against Iranian nuclear facilities, the UK stated that it had not participated in either the Israeli or US strikes. The UK government called for de-escalation and said that military action alone could not provide a durable solution to concerns about Iran's nuclear programme.

After the United States and Israel began a further military campaign against Iran in February 2026, the UK again stated that it had not participated in the initial strikes. Prime Minister Keir Starmer said that the UK preferred a negotiated settlement in which Iran abandoned its aspiration to develop a nuclear weapon. The UK subsequently conducted defensive military operations in the region and authorized the United States to use British bases for specific and limited defensive action against Iranian missile facilities. The UK government characterized these actions as collective self-defence and stated that they did not constitute wider UK involvement in the conflict.

On 2 March 2026, Starmer reiterated that the UK had not joined US offensive operations, while stating that British forces were participating in defensive operations and that British bases could be used for specific, limited defensive purposes. He described the UK's actions as collective self-defence of allies and protection of British lives.

=== France ===
France has consistently opposed Iran acquiring a nuclear weapon while supporting a diplomatic solution to the dispute over Iran's nuclear programme. The French government states that it supports Iran's right to a civilian nuclear programme but rejects the acquisition of nuclear weapons and has participated in diplomatic efforts to address the issue.

France also continued to work with the E3 and other international partners on nuclear non-proliferation. In June 2026, it reiterated its support for the International Atomic Energy Agency and for diplomatic efforts aimed at reaching an agreement ensuring that Iran does not acquire nuclear weapons.

=== Germany ===
On March 16, 2023, German Chancellor Olaf Scholz discussed Iran's nuclear program with Israeli Prime Minister Benjamin Netanyahu during Netanyahu's visit to Berlin. Scholz stated that Iran "cannot be allowed to obtain nuclear weapons" and reaffirmed that "the security of Israel is our raison d'état."

=== PMOI and NCRI ===
The People's Mujahedin Organization of Iran (MEK or PMOI) is an Iranian opposition organization that advocates the overthrow of the Islamic Republic and has supported international pressure against the Iranian government. In August 2002, the National Council of Resistance of Iran publicly disclosed information about nuclear facilities at Natanz and Arak. Congressional Research Service reports state that this information contributed to international scrutiny of Iran's nuclear activities.

=== Scholarly and thinktank views in support of an attack ===
In 2012, Matthew Kroenig, then a Stanton Nuclear Security Fellow at the Council on Foreign Relations, argued that a military strike against Iran's nuclear program was the "least bad option." He argued that skeptics of military action underestimated the threat posed by a nuclear-armed Iran and that a carefully managed strike could "spare the region and the world a very real threat" and "dramatically improve the long-term national security of the United States."

In September 2022, Bill Roggio, a senior fellow at the Foundation for Defense of Democracies (FDD) and editor of FDD's Long War Journal, reported that senior Al-Qaeda leaders, including Saif al-Adel, had been identified in Tehran. Roggio reported that two U.S. intelligence officials independently confirmed the authenticity of a photograph showing al-Adel and two other senior al-Qaeda figures in the Iranian capital.

Charles Lister, Senior Fellow, Director of Syria and Countering Terrorism & Extremism Programs at the Middle East Institute, warned that "a catastrophic ISIS resurgence is just a matter of time."

On May 26, 2023, Jason Brodsky, Policy Director of the U.S.-based United Against Nuclear Iran (UANI), said, "[Iran] is likely to enrich uranium to weapons-grade levels at 90%."

Matthew Kroenig, Stanton Nuclear Security Fellow at the Council on Foreign Relations, and Special Adviser in the Office of the Secretary of Defense from July 2010 to July 2011, argued in 2012 that skeptics of military action fail to appreciate the threats posed by a nuclear Iran. If managed carefully, Kroenig believes that a surgical military strike targeting Iran's nuclear facilities "could spare the region and the world a very real threat and dramatically improve the long-term national security of the United States." He said a nuclear-armed Iran would limit U.S. leverage in the Middle East, and Iran's rivals like Saudi Arabia would probably seek nuclear weapons and spark an arms race. Once Iran had a nuclear device, he believed, Tehran could "choose to spur proliferation by transferring nuclear technology to its allies—other countries and terrorist groups alike" in order to contain its regional rivals. In the midst of a global economic downturn, Kroenig believes that containing a nuclear-armed Iran would be a massive financial, political, and military burden for the United States. A surgical strike would be less costly. Kroenig notes that airstrike skeptics are concerned that military planners will not know the location of some key facilities. Kroenig thinks this concern is overblown: "U.S. intelligence agencies, the IAEA, and opposition groups within Iran have provided timely warning of Tehran's nuclear activities in the past—exposing, for example, Iran's secret construction at Natanz and Qom before those facilities ever became operational."

== Opposition ==
=== 2005 ===
Journalist Seymour Hersh said in the New Yorker that United States' concerns over the alleged threat posed by the possibility that Iran may have a nuclear weapons program might lead the US government to take military action against that country.

Former UN weapons of mass destruction inspector in Iraq from 1991 to 1998, Scott Ritter said the same thing in ZMag.

In March 2005, former U.S. Attorney General Ramsey Clark, British MP George Galloway, former UN Assistant Secretary-General Dennis Halliday, former First Lady of Greece Margarita Papandreou, Bishop Thomas Gumbleton and others launched an international campaign called Stop War on Iran.

In August 2005, Philip Giraldi, a former CIA officer and conspiracty theorist, wrote in American Conservative that the US was about to decalre war on Iran.

The organisation Campaign Against Sanctions and Military Intervention in Iran (CASMII) was founded on December 1, 2005, in London.

=== 2006 ===
The Westminster Committee on Iran was founded in London in 2006 to increase dialogue and understanding between Tehran and British parliamentarians with a view to avoiding military intervention against Iran. The Committee holds regular meetings and roundtable discussions both inside and outside of Parliament. The Committee advocates for balanced and objective reporting on Iran and genuine international diplomacy in all dealings with Tehran.

During global anti-war protests on March 18, 2006, in addition to protests against the Iraq War, many of the protests were directed against the perceived threat against Iran. On September 23, 2006, one of the main slogans and themes of speakers at a demonstration of about 50,000 people criticising British prime minister Tony Blair at the Labour Party Annual Conference in Manchester was the call "Don't attack Iran".

Stephen Zunes claimed in ZNet that the United States planned a military attack against Iran. Seymour Hersh again wrote in the New Yorker that a nuclear attack by the US on Iran was imminent.

On April 12, 2006, the political group MoveOn, which organises and informs an online community estimated at 3 million people, called on its supporters to lobby the United States Congress to prevent US president George W. Bush from attacking Iran with nuclear weapons.

On September 16, 2006, representatives of the 118 states of the Non-Aligned Movement made a statement, at the summit level, supporting Iran's civilian nuclear program and opposing military attacks against nuclear facilities, stating "The ministers reaffirmed the inviolability of peaceful nuclear activities and that any attack or threat of attack against peaceful nuclear facilities, operational or under construction, poses a great danger to human beings and the environment, and constitutes a grave violation of international law, principles and purposes of the Charter of the United Nations and regulations of the IAEA. They recognized the need for a comprehensive multilaterally negotiated instrument, prohibiting attacks, or threat of attacks on nuclear facilities devoted to peaceful uses of nuclear energy."

Two UK organisations opposed to an attack on Iran, Action Iran, and Iran Solidarity joined with CASMII UK on November 6, 2006, to form a new organisation in the UK called Campaign Iran, which remains part of the international CASMII. In November 2006, several organisations in the San Francisco Bay Area in the US, in particular American Friends Service Committee, Bay Area United Against the War, Bay Area Labor Committee for Peace and Justice, Berkeley Gray Panthers, Courage To Resist, Crabgrass, Declaration of Peace SF Bay Area, Ecumenical Peace Institute/Calc, Grandmothers for Peace, South Bay Mobilization, and The World Can't Wait--Drive Out The Bush Regime!, organised themselves together as the "Don't Attack Iran Coalition" and called for various actions including direct contact between US leaders and/or members of US Congress and Iranian leaders and members of parliament.

=== 2007 ===
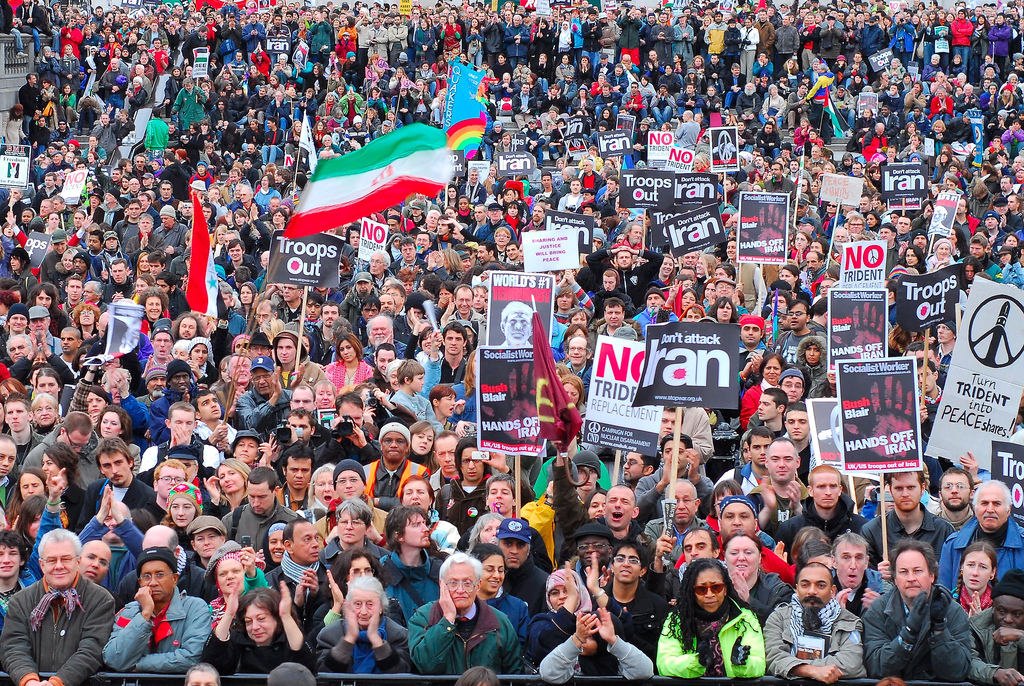
Stop the War Coalition protests in London on 24 February 2007

Noam Chomsky claimed in ZMag in February 2007 that the real reason for then President George W. Bush to attack would be to "control Middle East energy resources", in particular petroleum.

In February 2007, ex-supreme NATO Commander, US General and 2004 presidential candidate Wesley Clark founded the website StopIranWar.com, which advocates against an attack on Iran.

In early April 2007, Michael T. Klare claimed in a blogspot for Tom's Dispatch that references to Iran by US president George W. Bush in major televised speeches on January 10, January 23 and February 14, 2007, establish that Bush "has already decided an attack is his only option and the rest is a charade he must go through to satisfy his European allies". Klare claims that in these speeches in particular, Bush has developed a casus belli in order to prepare public opinion for an attack, focussed on three reasons: claims that Iran supports attacks on US troops in Iraq, claims that Iran has a nuclear weapons program, and claims that Iran could become a dominant power in the region and destabilise pro-US governments in Israel, Jordan, Bahrain and Saudi Arabia.

On June 14, 2007, the Director General (DG) of the International Atomic Energy Agency (IAEA), Mohamed ElBaradei, speaking at a meeting of the IAEA, said that war against Iran "would be catastrophic, it would be an act of madness, and it would not solve the issue". During the preceding several weeks, ElBaradei had several times expressed his opposition to a military attack on Iran. He made these statements as part of what he saw as his role as Director General of the IAEA, stating "I have no brief other than to make sure we do not go into another war, or that we go crazy into killing each other."

In June 2007, on the 20th anniversary of the June 28, 1987 chemical weapons attack on the Iranian town of Sardasht, two Iranian NGOs, the Society for Chemical Weapons Victims Support (SCWVS) and the Organisation for Defence of Victims of Violence (ODVV), signed a joint petition with Campaign Against Sanctions and Military Intervention in Iran opposing both sanctions and a military attack against Iran, as well as asking the Iranian government to "pay more attention to human rights and social and political freedoms, so as to create the grounds for a stronger and greater unity of the people of Iran in the face of foreign pressures and threats."

On August 6, 2007, the 62nd anniversary of the atomic bombing of Hiroshima, several Nobel Prize winners, Shirin Ebadi, Mairead Corrigan-Maguire and Betty Williams, Harold Pinter and Jody Williams, along with several anti-war groups, including The Israeli Committee for a Middle East Free from Atomic, Biological and Chemical Weapons, Campaign for Nuclear Disarmament, CASMII, Code Pink and many others, warned about what they believed was the imminent risk of a "war of an unprecedented scale, this time against Iran", especially expressing concern that an attack on Iran using nuclear weapons had "not been ruled out". They quoted Bertrand Russell and Albert Einstein's July 1955 statement ending "The question we have to ask ourselves is: what steps can be taken to prevent a military conflict of which the issue must be disastrous to all species?" They listed specific steps which they judged would reduce the risk of nuclear war in the Middle East, including a call for "the dispute about Iran's nuclear programme, to be resolved through peaceful means" and a call for Israel, "as the only Middle Eastern state suspected of possession of nuclear weapons", to join the Nuclear Non-Proliferation Treaty.

On September 21, 2007, at a speech by French Foreign Minister Bernard Kouchner in Washington, D.C., protestors from Code Pink displayed banners with the slogan "Bush + Kouchner = Warmongers!", one of them tried to climb onto the stage, and they shouted, "No war with Iran! No war with Iran!" The protestors were removed from the room by security forces, but returned after Kouchner requested that they be allowed to return. He stated, "I'm not in favor of war with Iran, I want to prevent the war—so they were right!"

During antiwar demonstrations in the United States on October 27, 2007, demonstrators in Minneapolis protested against military action against Iran.

On November 2, 2007, Jim Webb and 29 other United States senators sent a letter to President George W. Bush stating that "no congressional authority exists for unilateral military action against Iran", that "the Senate vote on September 26, 2007 on an amendment to the FY 2008 National Defense Authorization Act ... should in no way be interpreted as a predicate for the use of military force in Iran" and "that offensive military action should not be taken against Iran without the express consent of Congress."

In November 2007, the Center for Arms Control and Non-Proliferation, a non-partisan arms control advocacy group in Washington, D.C., launched a campaign aimed at gaining support for a diplomatic, non-military, solution to growing tension in U.S.–Iran relations, which including blog and newspaper ads in efforts to gain 1 million signatures urging Congress to promote diplomacy.

In December 2007, the founding conference of Hands Off the People of Iran (HOPI) was held in London. HOPI opposes military action against Iran whilst criticising the current Iranian government as "reactionary". HOPI said it was supported by a number of prominent figures on the left in Britain and around the world, including Tony Benn, John McDonnell, Tommy Sheridan, Peter Tatchell, Naomi Klein, Ken Loach, Michael Mansfield QC, John Pilger and Noam Chomsky.

=== 2008 ===
In an interview with Esquire magazine in March, Admiral William J. Fallon, then head of United States Central Command, expressed opposition to war with Iran. On March 11, Fallon resigned in part due to his opposition.

On May 8, United States Representative John Conyers, Jr. wrote a letter to President George W. Bush, threatening him with impeachment if he were to attack Iran without Congressional authorization.

On June 20, Russian Foreign Minister Sergey Lavrov warned Israel not to attack Iran.

On June 21, Director General of the International Atomic Energy Agency Mohamed ElBaradei threatened to resign if Iran is attacked, saying that such an attack would turn the Middle East into a "ball of fire".

On July 4, Iraq's Prime Minister Nouri al-Maliki said that he will not allow Iraqi land, sea, or airspace to be used for an attack on Iran. On July 5, Iraqi representative Mahmoud Othman warned that military action against Iran would destabilize Iraq.

=== Scholarly views in opposition to an attack ===
Scott Sagan, professor of political science and senior fellow at the Center for International Security and Cooperation at Stanford University, argues that threatening Iran with government change would not stop Iran from pursuing a uranium enrichment program. To the contrary, Iran would to continue moving the program forward as a reaction to a military threat. Sagan goes on to say that the United States should jettison the military option and offer Iran limited security guarantees. By keeping the guarantees limited, the U.S. maintains a credible deterrent, which Sagan recognizes as important because Iran is a state sponsor of terrorism. "Given the need for Washington to have a credible deterrent against, say, terrorist attacks sponsored by Iran, it would be ill advised to offer Tehran a blanket security guarantee. But more limited guarantees, such as a commitment not to use nuclear weapons and other commitments of the type offered to North Korea under the Agreed Framework, could be effective today." Such a framework, Sagan maintains, could help to convince Tehran that a nuclear bomb is not the "be all and end all of security".

In 2012 article in Foreign Affairs in response to Kroenig, Colin Kahl, Associate Professor in the Security Studies Program at Georgetown University's Edmund A. Walsh School of Foreign Service, argued that war with Iran should be a last resort. Kahl noted that while the IAEA has "documented Iranian efforts to achieve the capacity to develop nuclear weapons at some point...there is no hard evidence that Supreme Leader Ayatollah Ali Khamenei has yet made the final decision to develop them," making Kroenig's claim of the urgent need to bomb Iran dubious. Kahl notes that Kroenig conflates the supposed timelines to produce weapons-grade uranium and the actual construction of a nuclear bomb. He also takes serious issue with Kroenig's contention that the United States could manage the escalation in a war with Iran: "[Kroenig's] picture of a clean, calibrated conflict is a mirage. Any war with Iran would be a messy and extraordinarily violent affair, with significant casualties and consequences."

In August 2012, Stephen M. Walt, Robert and Renée Belfer professor of international relations at Harvard University, argued that the collective sabre rattling from Israel's politicians, and repeated assertions about "closing windows", "red lines", and "zones of immunity", with regard to an imminent Israeli attack against Iran, was bluff. In his analysis Israel lacks the military means alone to cause sufficient damage to Iran's nuclear facilities. The wave of public declarations constitutes a campaign, he continues, whose purpose is to pressure the Obama administration to impose both stricter sanctions and extract a public undertaking by President Obama that he is willing to use force. In his view, this ploy intends to inch the U.S. closer to declaring a war that Israel on its own itself cannot undertake.

== Polls in the United States ==
A 2022 opinion poll in the United States, from before President Biden said that the JCPOA is dead, showed that although Americans view the prospect of a nuclear Iran as deeply alarming, only 12% support war with Iran. JCPOA renewal diplomacy failed in early September 2022, and economic sanctions have failed to stop Iran's illegal nuclear program. According to a Gallup poll that was performed in July 2019, 18% support military action against Iran, 35% support military action if diplomatic/economic efforts fail, and 43% oppose military action even if diplomatic/economic efforts fail.

=== Historical polls in support of a strike ===
A poll conducted in July 2012 found that 80% of Americans view Iran's nuclear program as a threat to the United States and its NATO allies. 39% viewed it as a very big threat, 41% viewed it was a moderate threat, 12% viewed it as not much of a threat, and 6% viewed it as not being a threat. In regards to how much of a threat the nuclear program is to Israel, 60% viewed it as a very big threat to Israel while 27% viewed it as a moderate threat. 80% believe that Iran is building nuclear weapons, including 72% of Democrats, 81% of Independents, and 89% of Republicans.

A poll conducted in September 2012 by Basswood Research for The Foreign Policy Initiative revealed that Iran was cited as the most dangerous threat to American national security interests, with 45.1% of respondents choosing Iran. In addition, 62% of Americans favored preventing Iran from obtaining nuclear weapons, even if this requires the use of military force, as opposed to avoiding a conflict and accepting the prospects of Iranian nuclear weapons.

In March 2012, a Reuters/Ipsos poll revealed that a majority of Americans, 56%, would support military action against Iran, even if it led to increased gas prices, if there was evidence demonstrating that Tehran was building nuclear weapons. 39% said that they opposed a military strike, while 62% of Americans said that they'd support Israel striking Iran over its nuclear program.

According to a Zogby Poll in the United States in late October 2007, 52% of respondents said they would support a US strike to prevent Iran from building a nuclear weapon and 53% said they believed it was likely that the US would attack Iran before the next presidential election in 2008.

In a TNS survey conducted in March 2007 among 17,443 people in 27 European Union member states, a majority of 52% agreed with the statement "We must stop countries like Iran from acquiring nuclear weapons, even if that means taking military action". A majority agreed with the statement in 18 member states, while a majority were against in 9 member states.

A majority (56 percent) in a Reuters/Zogby poll conducted in the United States during September 22–25, 2006 and published on September 28, 2006, was in favour of a joint US-European attack on Iran.

Polls with leading information, such as a Los Angeles Times/Bloomberg poll taken June 24–27, 2006, asking "If Iran continues to produce material that can be used to develop nuclear weapons, would you support or oppose the U.S. taking military action against Iran?", gave support for an attack on Iran, 52% versus 37%.

=== Historical polls in opposition to a strike ===
In 2012, the Chicago Council on Global Affairs surveyed American citizens about foreign policy issues, while also looking at previous polls. They note "When it comes to Iran, far more Americans endorse diplomatic rather than military solutions to deal with the nuclear threat...majorities generally oppose the use of force to deal with Iran as well as U.S. involvement in a potential war between Israel and Iran over Iran's nuclear program. The experience of wars in Iraq and Afghanistan is likely related to this declining desire to use force." Still as the report notes later 64% say Iran's nuclear problem is a critical threat to the United States and that "Americans are...willing to take measures to counter the nuclear threat in both Iran and North Korea, but are much more guarded, stopping short of supporting military strikes."

A CBS November 6–10, 2011 poll indicated that 15% of US citizens supported a US attack on Iran at the time of taking the poll. (Polls regarding the opinion of US adults about an attack against Iran suggested majority opposition to an attack on Iran among US adults for a question where no leading information was supplied to those polled.)

During 2007, CNN/Opinion Research Corporation polls in January, June and October 12–14, 2007, found an approximately stable, roughly 2/3 majority (68 percent, 63 percent and 68 percent respectively) opposed to a US military attack against Iran.

In a USA Today/Gallup poll on November 2–4, 2007 with leading information in the question "What do you think the United States should do to get Iran to shut down its nuclear program: take military action against Iran, or rely mainly on economic and diplomatic efforts?", a large majority (73 percent) preferred economic/diplomatic efforts, with 18 percent favouring military action. In the following poll question, an absolute majority (55 percent) directly opposed military action against Iran even if "U.S. economic and diplomatic efforts do not work."

A CNN poll taken on October 12–14, 2007 indicated 68% opposition to an attack on Iran.

A Newsweek Poll taken on October 19–20, 2006 with the leading information "if that country [Iran] continues its efforts to develop nuclear weapons" gave a large majority (76 percent) opposed to a land attack and a small majority (54 percent) opposed to an air attack, conditional on the claim in the leading information.

A Reuters/Zogby opinion poll taken in the US during September 22–25, 2006 and published on September 28, 2006, found 70 percent in opposition to a US (only) attack on Iran, 9 percent in favor of "air strikes on selected military targets", and 26 percent in support of the use of US (only) ground forces. Opposition to Israeli intervention weighed in at 47 percent (with 42 percent supportive).

== See also ==
- United Nations Security Council Resolution 1747
- Iran–United States relations
- Government-organized demonstration in Iran
- Anti-Iranian sentiment
- Iran and weapons of mass destruction
- Iran and state-sponsored terrorism
- Middle East Institute, Iran Program
- United Against Nuclear Iran
- Foundation for the Defense of Democracies (FDD), Iran Project
- June 2025 Israeli strikes on Iran
- 2026 Iran war
