= Kłosówko, Pomeranian Voivodeship =

Kłosówko
- Village
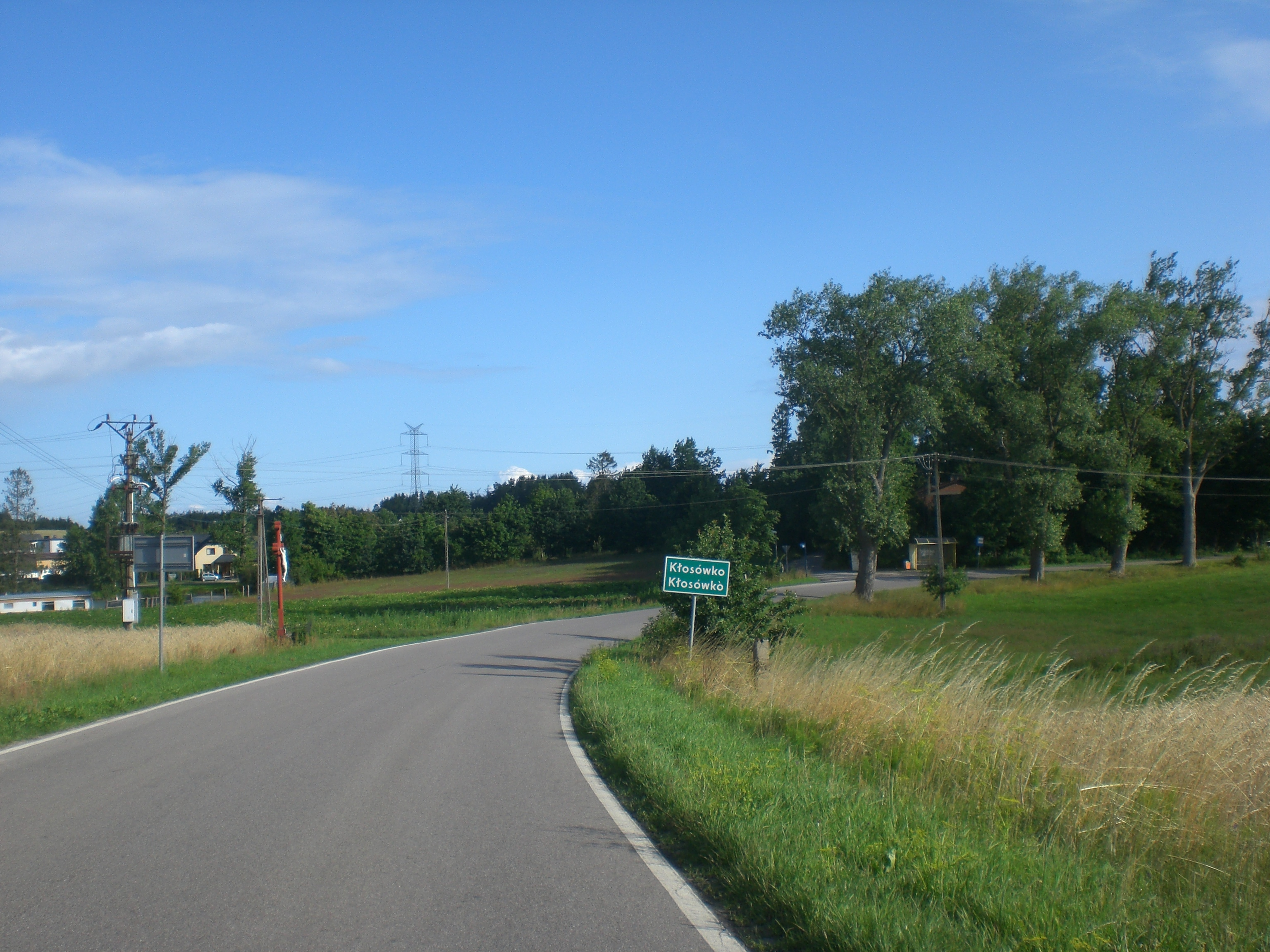

- Location within Poland
- Coordinates: 54°26′N 18°17′E
- Country: Poland
- Voivodeship: Pomeranian
- County: Kartuzy
- Gmina: Przodkowo
- Population: 51

Kłosówko [kwɔˈsufkɔ] is a village in the administrative district of Gmina Przodkowo, within Kartuzy County, Pomeranian Voivodeship, in northern Poland.

For details of the history of the region, see History of Pomerania.
