= Hoppy (nickname) =

As a nickname, Hoppy may refer to:

- Jocelyn Lee Hardy (1894–1958), British Army major
- Jeff Hopgood (1948–2006), Australian rules footballer
- John Hopkins (political activist) (1937–2015), British photographer and counter-culture activist/instigator
- Richard Hopkins (civil servant) (1880–1955), British civil servant
- Roy M. Hopkins (1943–2006), American politician
- George F. Hopkinson (1896–1943), British Army major-general
- Irving O. Hunt (1878–1951), American football player and coach and hockey player
- Ozell Jones (1960–2006), American basketball player
- Hoppy Kamiyama (born 1960), Japanese keyboardist and music producer
- Ernesto Rossi (gangster) (1903–1931), American gangster, early associate of Al Capone

== See also ==
- Hoppy (disambiguation)
