= Czeczewo, Pomeranian Voivodeship =

Czeczewo
- Village
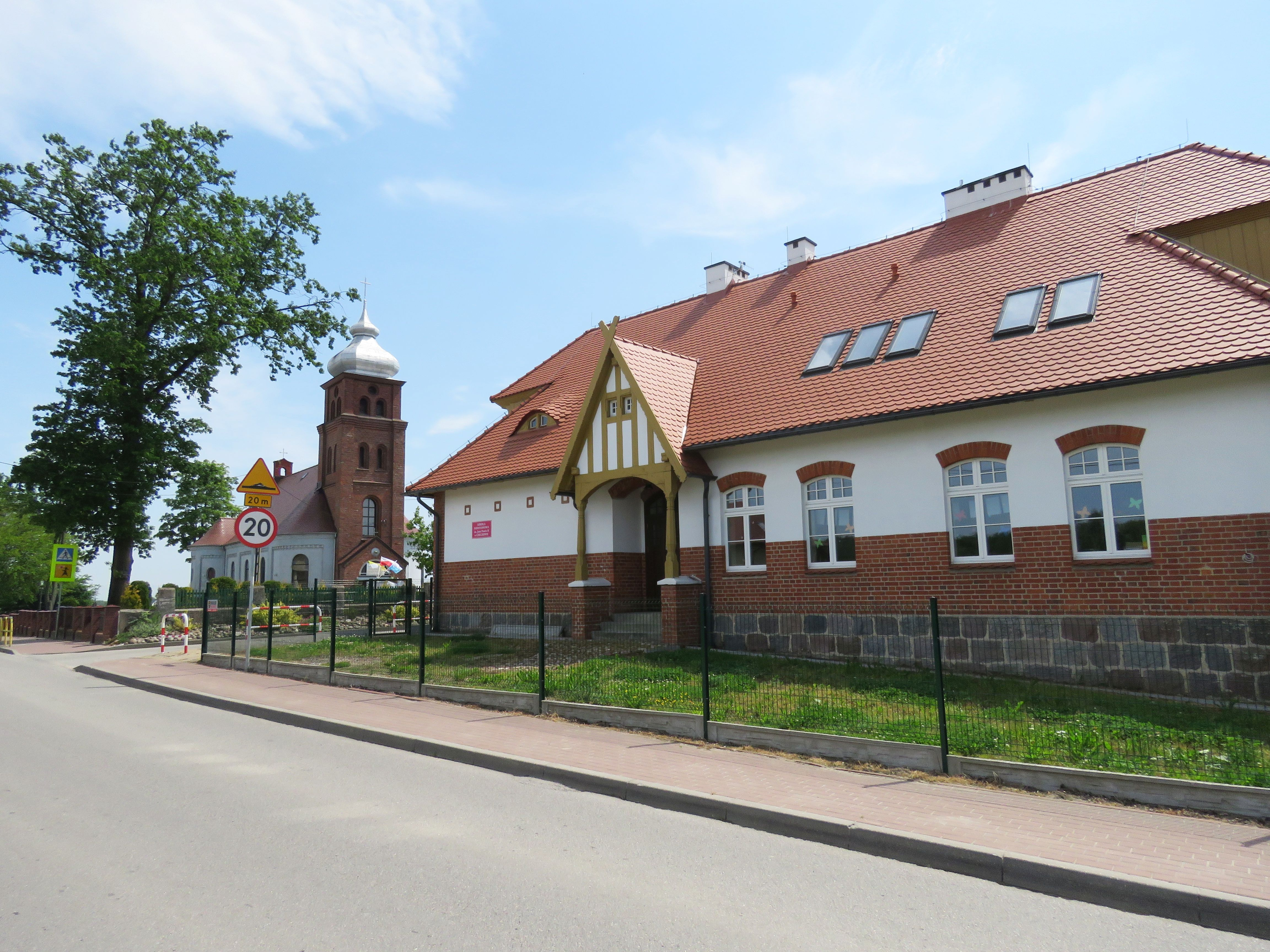
- Elementary school and Saint Joseph church in Czeczewo

- Location within Poland
- Coordinates: 54°24′50″N 18°18′46″E
- Country: Poland
- Voivodeship: Pomeranian
- County: Kartuzy
- Gmina: Przodkowo

Population
  - Total: 389
- Time zone: UTC+1 (CET)
  - Summer (DST): UTC+2 (CEST)
- Vehicle registration: GKA

Czeczewo [t͡ʂɛˈt͡ʂɛvɔ] is a village in the administrative district of Gmina Przodkowo, within Kartuzy County, Pomeranian Voivodeship, in northern Poland.

== History ==
Czeczewo was a private village of Polish nobility, administratively located in the Gdańsk County in the Pomeranian Voivodeship of the Kingdom of Poland.
