= Kłosowo-Piekło =

- Settlement
- Location within Poland
- Coordinates: 54°24′31″N 18°16′29″E
- Country: Poland
- Voivodeship: Pomeranian
- County: Kartuzy
- Gmina: Przodkowo

Kłosowo-Piekło [kwɔˈsɔvɔ ˈpjɛkwɔ] is a settlement in the administrative district of Gmina Przodkowo, within Kartuzy County, Pomeranian Voivodeship, in northern Poland.

For details of the history of the region, see History of Pomerania.
