= Gmina Przodkowo =

Gmina Przodkowo Przodkowo Commune
- Gmina
- Coat of arms
- Interactive map of Gmina Przodkowo
- Coordinates (Przodkowo): 54°22′47″N 18°17′15″E
- Country: Poland
- Voivodeship: Pomeranian
- County: Kartuzy
- Seat: Przodkowo

Area
  - Total: 85.39 km^{2} (32.97 sq mi)

Population (2006)
  - Total: 6,950
  - Density: 81.4/km^{2} (211/sq mi)
- Website: https://www.przodkowo.pl

Gmina Przodkowo (Kashubian: Przedkòwò) is a rural gmina (administrative district) in Kartuzy County, Pomeranian Voivodeship, in northern Poland. Its seat is the village of Przodkowo, which lies approximately 8 kilometres (5 mi) north-east of Kartuzy and 23 km (14 mi) west of the regional capital Gdańsk.

The gmina covers an area of 85.39 square kilometres (33.0 sq mi), and as of 2006 its total population is 6,950.

== Villages ==
Gmina Przodkowo contains the villages and settlements of Bagniewo, Barwik, Bielawy, Brzeziny, Buczyno, Bursztynik, Czarna Huta, Czeczewo, Gliniewo, Hejtus, Hopy, Kawle Dolne, Kawle Górne, Kczewo, Kłosówko, Kłosowo, Kłosowo-Piekło, Kłosowo-Wybudowanie, Kobysewo, Kosowo, Krzywda, Masłowo, Młynek, Nowe Tokary, Osowa Góra, Otalżyno, Piekiełko, Pomieczyno, Pomieczyno Małe, Przodkowo, Przodkowo Działki, Przodkowo-Wybudowanie, Rąb, Smołdzino, Sośniak, Stanisławy, Szarłata, Tokarskie Pnie, Tokary, Trzy Rzeki, Warzenko, Warzeńska Huta, Wilanowo, Załęskie Piaski and Załęże.

== Neighbouring gminas ==
Gmina Przodkowo is bordered by the gminas of Kartuzy, Szemud and Żukowo.
