= Kosowo, Pomeranian Voivodeship =

Kosowo
- Village
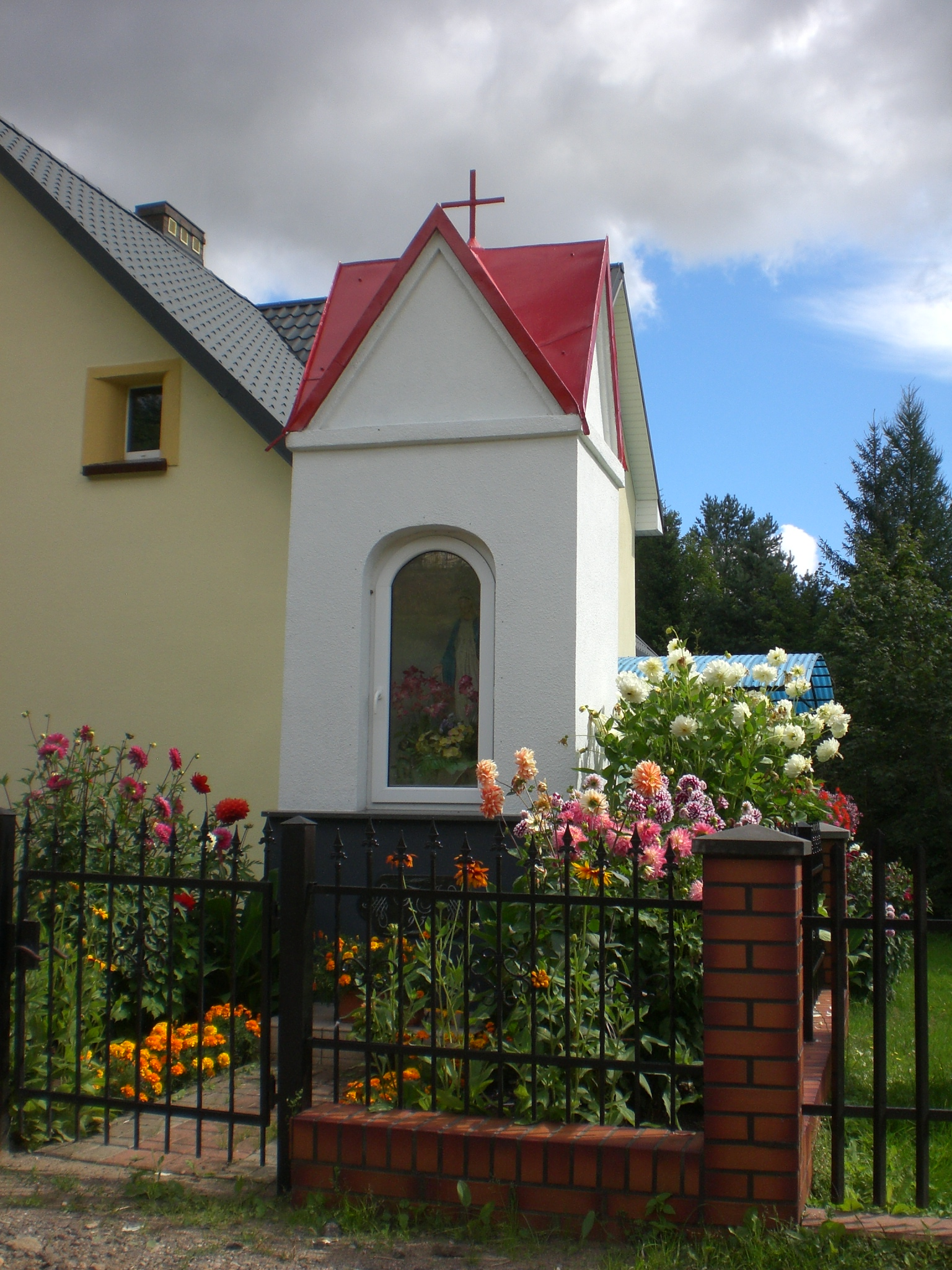
- Wayside shrine in Kosowo

- Location within Poland
- Coordinates: 54°22′N 18°15′E
- Country: Poland
- Voivodeship: Pomeranian
- County: Kartuzy
- Gmina: Przodkowo
- Population: 370
- Time zone: UTC+1 (CET)
  - Summer (DST): UTC+2 (CEST)

Kosowo [kɔˈsɔvɔ] is a village in the administrative district of Gmina Przodkowo, within Kartuzy County, Pomeranian Voivodeship, in northern Poland. It is located within the historic region of Pomerania.

Kosowo was a royal village of the Polish Crown, administratively located in the Gdańsk County in the Pomeranian Voivodeship.
