= Przodkowo Działki =

- Village
- Location within Poland
- Coordinates: 54°22′47″N 18°17′45″E
- Country: Poland
- Voivodeship: Pomeranian
- County: Kartuzy
- Gmina: Przodkowo
- Population: 901

Przodkowo Działki [pʂɔtˈkɔvɔ ˈd͡ʑau̯ki] is a village in the administrative district of Gmina Przodkowo, within Kartuzy County, Pomeranian Voivodeship, in northern Poland.

For details of the history of the region, see History of Pomerania.
