= Otalżyno =

- Village
- Location within Poland
- Coordinates: 54°26′0″N 18°12′33″E
- Country: Poland
- Voivodeship: Pomeranian
- County: Kartuzy
- Gmina: Przodkowo

Otalżyno [ɔtalˈʐɨnɔ] is a village in the administrative district of Gmina Przodkowo, within Kartuzy County, Pomeranian Voivodeship, in northern Poland.

For details of the history of the region, see History of Pomerania.
