= Grandmothers for Peace =

US peace organization

- Formation: May 1982; 43 years ago
- Founder: Barbara Wiedner (1928–2001)
- Founded at: Sacramento, California, US
- Purpose: Anti-war; Anti-nuclear
- Headquarters: Elk Grove, California, US
- Director: Lorraine Krofchok
- Website: www.grandmothersforpeace.org

Grandmothers for Peace (a.k.a. Grandmothers for Peace International) is an organization started by Barbara Wiedner (1928–2001) in May 1982 in Sacramento, California, in the US, after the mass media became "captivated by the image of a grandmother Barbara Wiedner risking jail through non-violent civil disobedience in an effort to save the planet from nuclear annihilation".

== History ==
Barbara Wiedner attended her first protest in 1981, at the age of 53, against 150 nuclear weapons that were stored at Mather Air Force Base, 15 minutes away from her house. Her granddaughter had made the " Grandmothers for Peace" sign for her. In 1982, in front of the same Air Force Base where she was protesting again, she got arrested for civil disobedience. After five days in jail, she held a meeting at her house with ten other women. They all pitched in a dollar to create the Grandmothers for Peace organization.

In November 1982, Wiedner led a peace tour in Russia. Her visit made the headlines in the Pravda. She later befriended Raisa Gorbacheva, and the Soviet spy Elizabeth Zarubina officially admitted to being an honorary member of the organization. General Lee Butler, who was in charge of the Mather Air Force Base, joined the Grandmothers for Peace organization after he retired from the Army.

In 1997, in Cape Canaveral, Grandmothers for Peace against NASA's launch of a plutonium-powered spacecraft (72-pound plutonium-powered Cassini rocket), which led to the arrest of 5 members of the organization who had dared to step in the highly-guarded facility. In 1998, the organization called for a national boycott against Nestlé after the company had launched a chocolate bar called "Nuclear Chocolate" to promote the release of the feature film Armageddon.

After the death of Barbara Wiedner in 2001, Lorraine Krofchok took over the direction of Grandmothers for Peace.

In 2006, the group participated in the Don't Attack Iran Coalition which opposed a military attack against Iran.

== Organization ==
The organisation includes over 40 chapters around the US and chapters in Berlin, Germany, Romania, South Africa and the United Kingdom.

== See also ==
- Veterans for Peace
- List of anti-war organizations
- Anti-nuclear organizations
- Nonviolence
