= Stanisławy =

- Village
- Location within Poland
- Coordinates: 54°23′15″N 18°13′55″E
- Country: Poland
- Voivodeship: Pomeranian
- County: Kartuzy
- Gmina: Przodkowo

Stanisławy (Polish pronunciation: [staniˈswavɨ]) is a village in the administrative district of Gmina Przodkowo, within Kartuzy County, Pomeranian Voivodeship, in northern Poland.
