= Szarłata =

- Village
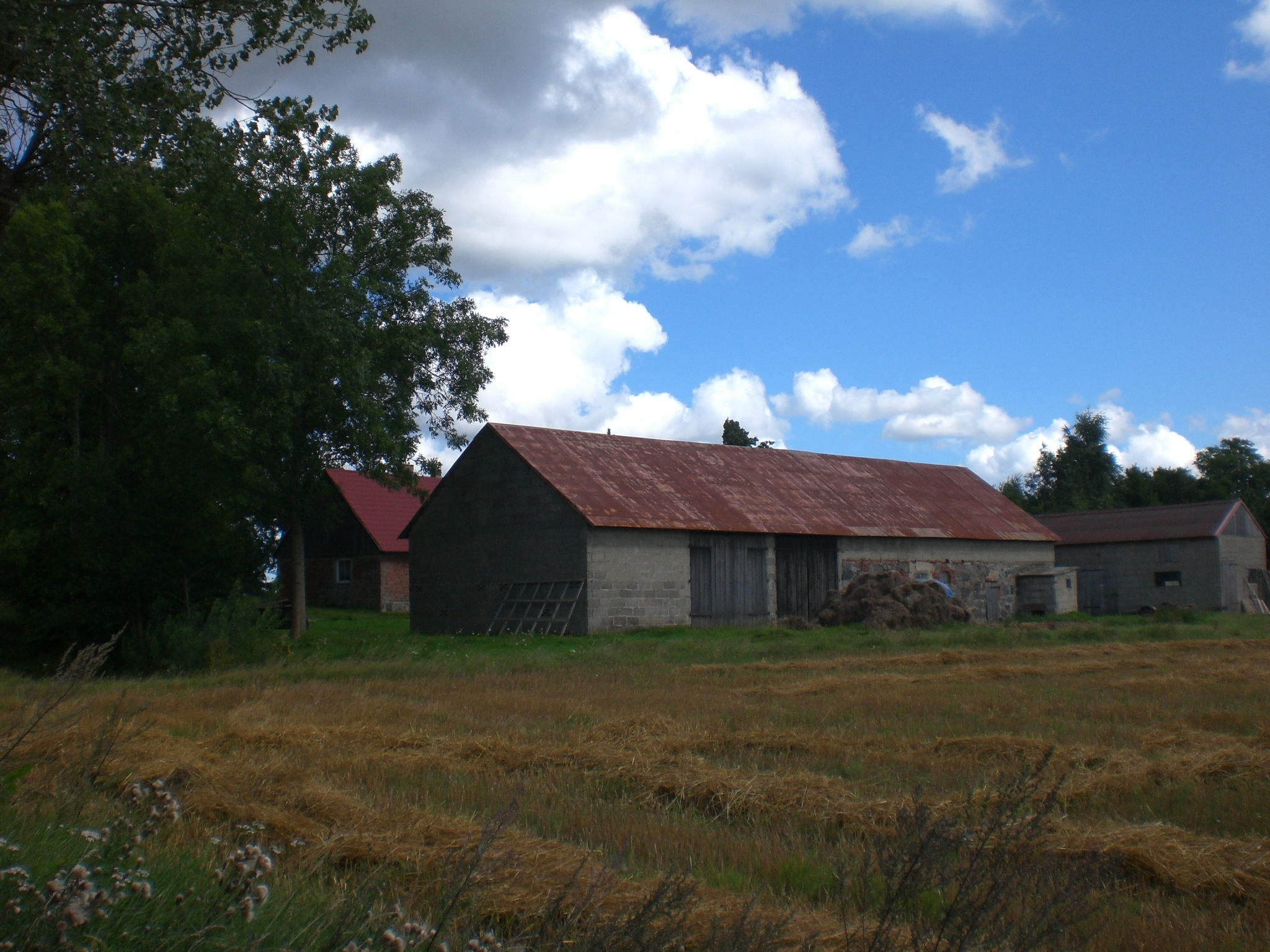

- Location within Poland
- Coordinates: 54°23′N 18°14′E
- Country: Poland
- Voivodeship: Pomeranian
- County: Kartuzy
- Gmina: Przodkowo

Population
  - Total: 558
- Vehicle registration: GKA

Szarłata [ʂarˈwata] is a village in the administrative district of Gmina Przodkowo, within Kartuzy County, Pomeranian Voivodeship, in northern Poland. It is located in the ethnocultural region of Kashubia in the historic region of Pomerania.

Six Polish citizens were murdered by Nazi Germany in the village during World War II.
