= Załęskie Piaski =

- Settlement
- Location within Poland
- Coordinates: 54°23′59″N 18°15′21″E
- Country: Poland
- Voivodeship: Pomeranian
- County: Kartuzy
- Gmina: Przodkowo

Załęskie Piaski (Polish pronunciation: [zaˈwɛ̃skʲɛ ˈpjaskʲi]) is a settlement in the administrative district of Gmina Przodkowo, within Kartuzy County, Pomeranian Voivodeship, in northern Poland.

For details of the history of the region, see History of Pomerania.
