= Przodkowo =

- Village
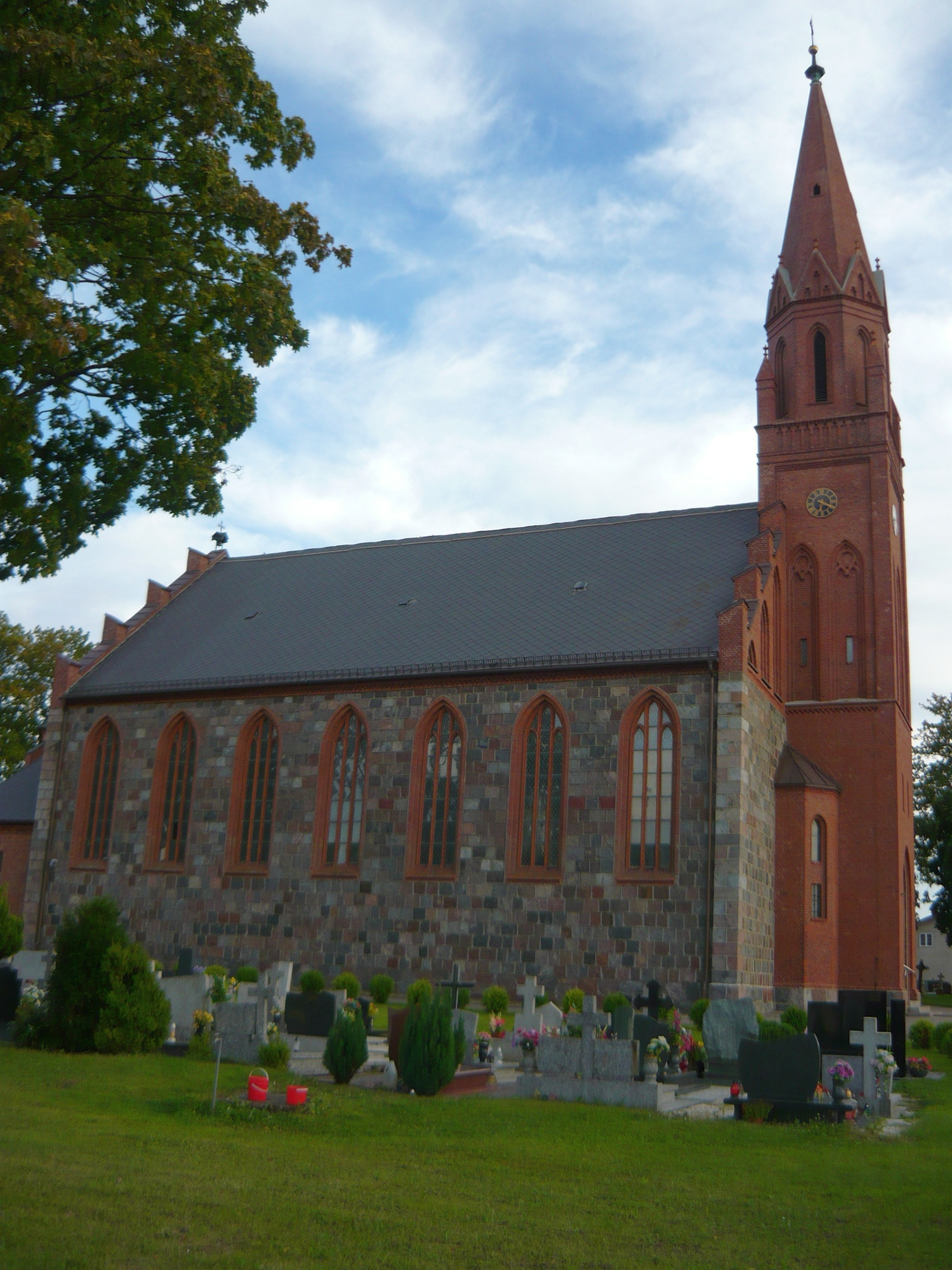
- Saint Andrew Church in Przodkowo

- Location within Poland
- Coordinates: 54°22′47″N 18°17′15″E
- Country: Poland
- Voivodeship: Pomeranian
- County: Kartuzy
- Gmina: Przodkowo

Population
  - Total: 1,286
- Time zone: UTC+1 (CET)
  - Summer (DST): UTC+2 (CEST)

Przodkowo [pʂɔtˈkɔvɔ] (German: Seefeld) is a village in Kartuzy County, Pomeranian Voivodeship, in northern Poland. It is the seat of the gmina (administrative district) called Gmina Przodkowo. It is located within the historic region of Pomerania.

During the German occupation (World War II), Przodkowo was one of the sites of executions of Poles, carried out by the Germans in 1939 as part of the Intelligenzaktion. The "death march" of about 11,000 prisoners evacuated by the Germans from the Stutthof concentration camp to Lębork passed through Przodkowo at the turn of January and February 1945. Many prisoners died as a result of hunger, exhaustion and executions by the Germans.

There is a Firefighting Museum (Muzeum Pożarnictwa) in Przodkowo.
