= Yassamine Mather =

Iranian scholar

- Education: University of Manchester, University of St Andrews
- Scientific career
- Institutions: University of Oxford

Yassamine Mather is an Iranian scholar and political activist. She is the acting editor of Critique: Journal of Socialist Theory. Her research on Iran is within the framework of the Middle East Centre, University of Oxford where she works. She is the chair of the Hands Off the People of Iran (HOPI).

== Scholarly work ==
Yassamine Mather has authored numerous journal articles. The latter explore, among others, politics in Iran and the Middle East in general.

== Media presence ==
Mather has been contributing to debates broadcast, among others, by BBC Persian and Radio NZ.

== Selected list of scholarly publications ==
- Slaughter, Cliff; Slaughter, Vivien; Mather, Yassamine (2018-11-12). Women And The Social Revolution (1st edition ed.). Spiderwize.
- Mather, Yassamine (2018-07-03). "The political economy of Iran's Islamic state, Donald Trump and threats of war". Critique. 46 (3): 443–469.
- Mather, Yassamine (2015-10-02). "The Middle East in the Midst of a Policy of Confusion and Muddle: Part 1". Critique. 43 (3–4): 347–363.
- Mather, Yassamine (2015-10-02). "The Middle East in the Midst of a Policy of Confusion and Muddle: Part 2". Critique. 43 (3–4): 365–373.
- Mather, Yassamine (2011-12-01). "Iran's Tudeh Party: A History of Compromises and Betrayals". Critique. 39 (4): 611–627.
