= Communist Students (Autonomous) =

Communist Students members on Free Education demonstration, February 2009

Communist Students is a Marxist student group, autonomous from but politically close to the Communist Party of Great Britain (Provisional Central Committee). It was launched at a founding conference in December 2006, with the adoption of a constitution and programme, and election of executive members. At its 2010 conference members of Communist Students voted overwhelmingly to change its constitution and declared itself an autonomous organisation.

As well as single issue campaigns (such as Hands Off the People of Iran and Stop The War Coalition), Communist Students organises within other leftist student and youth groups, including the Labour Representation Committee's youth section, the Socialist Youth Network, and the National Campaign Against Fees and Cuts.

Central to their work is the free publication which they produce and distribute, Communist Student. In this paper they have covered issues ranging from student fees, Iran, Palestine, democracy on the left, and a debate on how to fight fascism. Additional to this newspaper they publish a number of articles and debates on their website.

== Political platform ==
As with most Marxist political groups, the core strategic aim of Communist Students is the revolutionary overthrow of capitalist society and its ultimate replacement with communism. This can, they argue, only be achieved through the mass action of the working class as a whole. In common with the linked adult organisation, the CPGB, the working class is here defined as "everyone who does not own or control the means of production" - as such, "the majority of students in a country like Britain are therefore part of the working class."

In contrast to other left-wing youth and student groups, who often emphasise the primacy of unity in action over programmatic discussion, CS argues that unity (and activity) must be based on programme, and that ultimately Marxism is uniquely able to provide that programme. Twinned with this is an emphasis on open discussion and debate, and CS conferences often focus on organised discussions on matters of programme. Political minorities are encouraged to fight for their views.

CS insists that the class struggle is an international struggle, and calls for an end to all military adventures it deems imperialist. However, it also stresses the importance of building active solidarity with the "working class progressive, democratic and secular forces fighting not only the presence of imperialism, but also their own ‘national’ oppressors".

== Criticism ==
Other groups on the far-left frequently criticise CS for being propagandistic, and failing to "advance a perspective and strategy for the concrete struggles of workers and students today", in the words of Revolution.

Common criticisms of the CPGB - in particular its arguments against a generalised No Platform anti-fascist policy - are often raised against CS as well.
