= Tokarskie Pnie =

- Settlement
- Location within Poland
- Coordinates: 54°24′3″N 18°18′36″E
- Country: Poland
- Voivodeship: Pomeranian
- County: Kartuzy
- Gmina: Przodkowo

Tokarskie Pnie [tɔˈkarskʲɛ ˈpɲɛ] is a settlement in the administrative district of Gmina Przodkowo, within Kartuzy County, Pomeranian Voivodeship, in northern Poland. It used to be a part of the Gdańsk Voivodeship between 1975 and 1998.

== See also ==
- History of Pomerania
