= Critique: Journal of Socialist Theory =

Critique
- Discipline: Political science
- Language: English
- Edited by: Hillel H. Ticktin

Publication details
- History: 1973-present
- Publisher: Routledge on behalf of the Centre for the Study of Socialist Theory and Movements (University of Glasgow)
- Frequency: Quarterly

Standard abbreviations
- ISO 4: Critique (Glasgow)

Indexing
- ISSN: 0301-7605 (print); 1748-8605 (web)
- OCLC no.: 70889137

Links
- Journal homepage

Critique: Journal of Socialist Theory is a Marxist academic journal published by the Centre for the Study of Socialist Theory and Movements (University of Glasgow). The journal was established in May 1973 by founding editor Hillel H. Ticktin as Critique: Journal of Marxist Theory and Soviet Studies. The acting Editor is Yassamine Mather.

Originating as an anti-Stalinist Soviet studies journal, with the editor accepting the analysis of Leon Trotsky as a corrective to the Stalinist ‘distortion’ of Marxism, the initial aim of Critique was to analyze the empirical reality of Stalinism, while rejecting the empiricist method, in order to discover the objective laws of motion of Stalinism. The journal accepted Trotsky's 1936 prognosis that the Soviet Union under Joseph Stalin's program of Socialism in One Country would fail and that the capitalist market system would be restored.

Since the dissolution of the Soviet Union, Critique has become a more general journal of socialist theory covering political economy, philosophy, history and art, examining capitalist and non-capitalist societies and the instability of world capitalism after the Cold War. Critique is issued four times per year and has been published by Routledge since April 2006. Notable contributors have included Hillel Ticktin, István Mészáros, Bertell Ollman, Ernest Mandel, James Petras, Roman Rosdolsky, Jürgen Rojahn and Chris Arthur.
