= Barwik =

- Village
- Location within Poland
- Coordinates: 54°24′8″N 18°11′10″E
- Country: Poland
- Voivodeship: Pomeranian
- County: Kartuzy
- Gmina: Przodkowo
- Population: 420

Barwik [ˈbarvik] is a village in the administrative district of Gmina Przodkowo, within Kartuzy County, Pomeranian Voivodeship, in northern Poland.

For details of the history of the region, see History of Pomerania.
