= Piekiełko, Gmina Przodkowo =

Piekiełko
- Settlement
- Location within Poland
- Coordinates: 54°24′40″N 18°17′52″E
- Country: Poland
- Voivodeship: Pomeranian
- County: Kartuzy
- Gmina: Przodkowo

Piekiełko [pjɛˈkʲɛu̯kɔ] is a settlement in the administrative district of Gmina Przodkowo, within Kartuzy County, Pomeranian Voivodeship, in northern Poland.

For details of the history of the region, see History of Pomerania.
