= Hands Off the People of Iran =

British political organisation

- Founded: 2007
- Type: Interest group
- Purpose: Anti-war, Peace, Secularism, Anti-clericalism, Anti-imperialism, Anti-capitalism, Anti-Zionism, Social equality
- Location: London, United Kingdom
- Region served: Worldwide
- Key people: Yassamine Mather (Chair); Mark Fischer (Secretary); Moshé Machover
- Website: www.hopoi.org

Hands Off the People of Iran (HOPI) is a political organisation in the United Kingdom founded in 2007, closely associated with the Communist Party of Great Britain (Provisional Central Committee). It is opposed to Western military intervention in Iran, as well as to the sitting Iranian government, and supports "internal" regime change. The three most prominent figures are Mike Macnair, the Israeli Moshé Machover and Yassamine Mather, an Iranian associated with the Workers Left Unity – Iran. It was denied affiliation with the Stop the War Coalition due to questions raised over its support for regime change.

== Formation ==
The initiative for Hands Off the People of Iran came from a number of Iranian exile organisations in 2005. On March 16, 2006, Workers Left Unity - Iran wrote an open letter to the British anti-war movement, calling for genuine solidarity with the Iranian people. By 2007 HOPI was fully established, consisting predominantly of Iranian exiles who campaign for regime change in Iran but are against external military intervention, believing military occupation to be the worst condition under which liberation can be achieved. HOPI's founding conference was held in December 2007.

At the Founding Conference, a National Steering Committee was established consisting of seventeen members from a range of different political organisations and political traditions. These include members of the Green Party of England and Wales, Labour Representation Committee, Jewish Socialist Group, Permanent Revolution, Centre for the Study of Socialist Theory and Movements at the University of Glasgow, Communist Party of Great Britain (Provisional Central Committee), Workers Left Unity - Iran, Revolutionary Workers of Iran, Anarchist Federation (pc) and Women’s Campaign Against All Misogynist Laws in Iran.

An Irish branch of HOPI, chaired by Anne McShane, organised a protest outside the Iranian Embassy in Dublin in June 2009.

== Expulsion from Stop the War Coalition ==
Shortly before Stop the War Coalition's 2007 AGM, HOPI, alongside another organisation Communist Students, was denied affiliation with the Coalition.

== Affiliates and Supporters ==
Prominent affiliates or supporters of HOPI include the Public and Commercial Services Union; ASLEF, the train drivers' union and Peter Tatchell.

== See also ==
- Opposition to military action against Iran
- Campaign Against Sanctions and Military Intervention in Iran
- List of anti-war organizations
