= Kłosowo, Kartuzy County =

Kłosowo
- Village
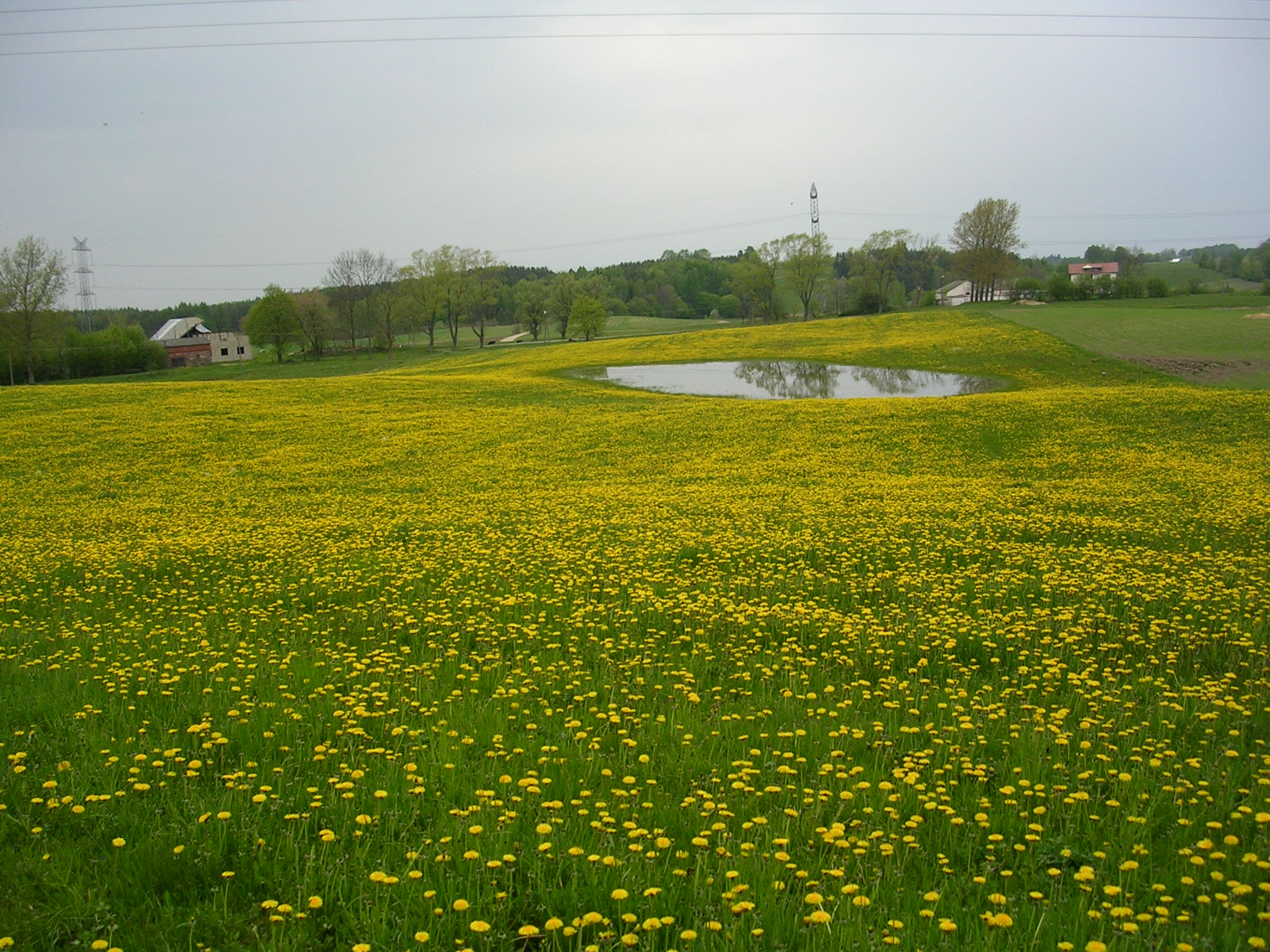
- Dandelion meadow near Kłosowo, Kartuzy County, May 2005

- Location within Poland
- Coordinates: 54°25′N 18°18′E
- Country: Poland
- Voivodeship: Pomeranian
- County: Kartuzy
- Gmina: Przodkowo
- Population: 311

Kłosowo [kwɔˈsɔvɔ] is a village in the administrative district of Gmina Przodkowo, within Kartuzy County, Pomeranian Voivodeship, in northern Poland.

For details of the history of the region, see History of Pomerania.
