= Persian Gulf Studies Center =

Persian gulf institute

- مرکز مطالعات خلیج فارس
- Abbreviation: PGSC
- Named after: Persian Gulf
- Formation: 2008; 18 years ago
- Founder: Rouzbeh Parsapour and Dr.Ajam
- Founded at: Alborz Province, Iran
- Type: Non Governmental Organization
- Registration no.: 2989
- Legal status: Active
- Headquarters: Alborz, Iran
- Fields: historical, geopolitical, geographical strategic studies
- Official language: Persian
- Website: persiangulfstudies.com/en. .

The Persian Gulf Studies Center (Persian: مرکز مطالعات خلیج فارس) abbreviated to PGSC, is an Institute of historical, geographical, geopolitical and strategic studies of the Persian Gulf and Arabian Sea. This study center is a Non Governmental Organization independent and is and managed by voluntary scholars and researches in Iran.

== Publications ==
The center has published many books, atlases and articles in Persian, English and Arabic also held seminars and festivals. Maps Documents on the Persian Gulf's name

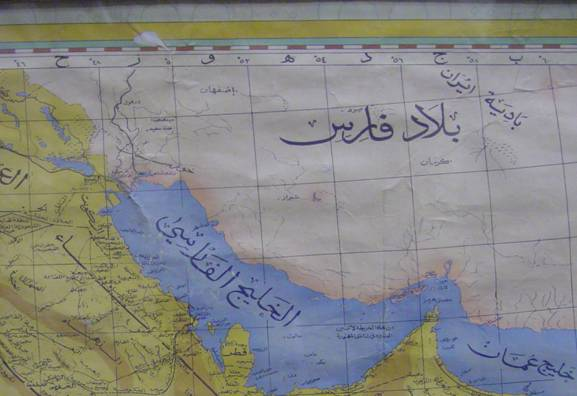
Saudi map of Persian Gulf

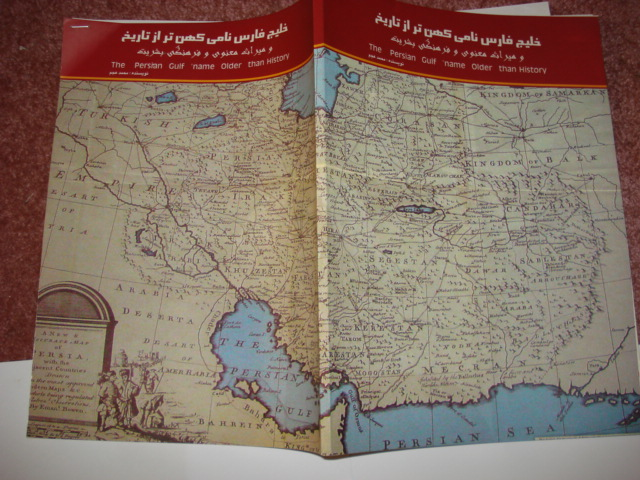
the Persian Gulf heritage.

== See also ==
- Persian Gulf
- Iranian studies
- History of Iran
- Persian Gulf naming dispute
- The Sharmin and Bijan Mossavar-Rahmani Center for Iran and Persian Gulf Studies
- Persian Gulf Online Organization
