= Sharmin and Bijan Mossavar-Rahmani Center for Iran and Persian Gulf Studies =

Department at Princeton University

The Sharmin and Bijan Mossavar-Rahmani Center for Iran and Persian Gulf Studies logo

The Sharmin and Bijan Mossavar-Rahmani Center for Iran and Persian Gulf Studies (Persian: مرکز شرمین و بیژن مصوّر رحمانی برای مطالعات ایران و خلیج فارس) is a study center department at Princeton University. Its aim is to support teaching and research of Iran and Persian Gulf studies and to create and support productive and innovative connections across departments throughout the university.

== See also ==
- Iranian studies
- History of Iran
- Persian Gulf Studies Center
- Persian Gulf Online Organization
- Persian Gulf naming dispute
