= Kaveh L. Afrasiabi =

Iranian-American political scientist

Kaveh Lotfollah Afrasiabi (Persian: کاوه لطف الله افراسیابی, born 1958) is an Iranian-American political scientist and author, living in Boston, Massachusetts.

In January 2021, Afrasiabi was arrested by the FBI on charges of working as an unregistered agent of the Iranian government. On September 18, 2023, Afrasiabi received a presidential pardon by President Joe Biden as part of an Iran–United States prisoner release mediated by Qatar.

== Career ==
Afrasiabi is a prominent Iranian-American political scientist and author of more than thirty five books on Iran, Middle East, international affairs, theology, as well as novels, plays, and poetry books. Afrasiabi gained a PhD in Political Science from Boston University in 1998, with a thesis titled "State and Populism in Iran" under the supervision of historian Howard Zinn. Afrasiabi has also studied theology at Andover-Newton Theological School and has published a seminal article on communicative theology in Harvard Theological Review. Afrasiabi's articles have repeatedly appeared in the UN Chronicle, Bulletin of Atomic Scientists, London's the Guardian, and the New York Times. Afrasiabi has won a number of literary awards including the Spring 2024 award by literature.com for the best short story, titled Love and Death in Iran. Afrasiabi has taught political science at the University of Tehran, Boston University, and Bentley University. Afrasiabi has been a visiting scholar at Harvard University (1989-1990, 2006-2007), University of California, Berkeley (2000-2001), Binghamton University (2001-2002) and the Center for Strategic Research, Tehran. Afrasiabi has authored several books and numerous scholarly articles on the subject of Iran's foreign and nuclear policies, including in Columbia Journal of International Affairs, Harvard International Review, and Brown's Journal of World Affairs. During 2004-2005, Afrasiabi was involved as an advisor to Iran's nuclear negotiation team and in various books, articles, and TV interviews fully supported the 2015 Iran nuclear deal as a "win-win".

Afrasiabi has been a consultant to the United Nations "Dialogue Among Civilizations", for which he interviewed the former Iranian president, Mohammad Khatami. Afrasiabi is also the founder of the inter-faith group, Global Interfaith Peace, and has repeatedly called for mandatory education in Iran on the Holocaust. Afrasiabi has supported the Iranian protesters and strongly condemned their repression by the Iranian regime. His personal website is: http://www.kavehafrasiabi.net.

Afrasiabi is a permanent resident of the U.S., living in Boston, Massachusetts.

== Controversy ==
=== Afrasiabi v. Harvard University and Roy Mottahedeh ===
From 1996 to 2003, Afrasiabi was involved in a legal conflict with Roy Mottahedeh, former director of the Center for Middle Eastern Studies at Harvard University, who had been his superior during Afrasiabi's time as a postdoctoral fellow at Harvard, and Harvard University and its police department itself. The conflict started with an alleged extortion against Mottahedeh's subordinates and a "pre-dawn" arrest of Afrasiabi by Harvard police, and terminated in 2003 with a civil rights case against Harvard Police, Mottahedeh, and his subordinates after Afrasiabi's exoneration and after a high-profile ten-day jury trial in the federal court in Boston ultimately reached the Supreme Court of the United States, in which Afrasiabi acted as his own attorney, alleging that he was a victim of gross human rights abuses at Harvard. During associated controversies, Afrasiabi was supported by Mike Wallace of the US television program 60 Minutes, author David Mamet, linguist Noam Chomsky and political scientist Howard Zinn, all of whom testified as Afrasiabi's character witnesses at the trial of Harvard defendants, described in the local media as an "epic David and Goliath" battle.

=== 2021 arrest for acting as an unregistered agent of Iran and 2023 Presidential Pardon ===
Afrasiabi was arrested in the U.S. on January 18, 2021, for acting as an unregistered agent of Iran.

He strongly denied the charges against him and represented himself in court, arguing that his limited international affairs consulting was perfectly legal under the UN guidelines and that it had no bearing on any of his publications, some of which are very critical of Iran, particularly on restricted elections and women's rights in Iran; Afrasiabi has published a feminist novel and a poetry book in defense of women's rights in Iran. According to Professor Chomsky, in a letter to the court, Afrasiabi collaborated with him for the successful release of three American hikers held in Iran. He was released on bail in January 2021, and ultimately all the charges against him were dropped at the pre-trial stage on September 18, 2023 as part of a presidential pardon.

In October 2026, Afrasiabi filed a multi-million dollar defamation lawsuit against attorney Mathew Sanderson and the law firm of Caplin and Drysdale in the federal court in Boston, alleging that the defendants maliciously distorted facts about his consulting role for Iran's mission to UN and refused to make the corrections when confronted with their sinister vilification of Afrasiabi.

== Selected works ==
- After Khomeini: New Directions in Iran's Foreign Policy (Westview Books, 1994)
- Islam and Ecology (Harvard University Press, 2003)
- Iran Nuclear Negotiations: Accord and Détente Since the Geneva Agreement of 2013 (Rowman & Littlefield, 2015)
- Iran Nuclear Accord and the Remaking of the Middle East (Rowman & littlefield, 2017)
- Trump and Iran: From Containment to Confrontation (Lexington Books, 2019)
- Aphorisms on Love, Life, Happiness, Freedom, Loss, Healing (2021)
- Upstairs, Downstairs at Andala: Short Stories (2017)
- Touched by Messiah: A Novella (2017)
- Shiraz Diaries and Jallad: A Novel (2016)
- Metaphors in September: Poems on 9/11 (2016)
- UN Management Reform: Selected Articles and Interviews in UN Chronicle (2011)
- Looking For Rights at Harvard (2010)
- The Agent of Peace: Response to US Accusation (2022)
- Peace on Earth: Poems (2022)
- Under Mahsa's Gaze: Poems (2022)
- The Pandemic Mirror: Poems (2021)
- John Quincy Adams and the Origins of Critical Legal Thought in America: A Heideggerian Interpretation (2022)
- Rumi in Soho: A Play (2022)
- Ode to Ukraine: Poems (2023)
- Warhol the Sketch Artist: A Play (2023)
- Romeo & Juliet in Kherson: A Play (2023)
- Noam Chomsky: Exchanges (2024)
- Twilight Zone: Short Stories (2025)
- Foucault a Teheran: Un Piece de theater (2025)
- L'amour d'un Allemand en Iran (2025)
- Minab: Poems on A War Tragedy (2026)
