= List of left-wing publications in the United Kingdom =

This is a list of left-wing publications published regularly in the United Kingdom. It includes newspapers, magazines, journals and websites.

== Current publications ==
=== Daily ===
- Daily Mirror – mainstream newspaper which has consistently supported the Labour Party since the 1945 general election.
- The Guardian – mainstream newspaper which has consistently supported centre-left politics, either reflected by the Labour Party or the Liberal Democrats.
- The Morning Star – co-operative, reader-owned socialist newspaper. Britain's Road to Socialism, the programme of the Communist Party of Britain, underlies the paper's editorial stance. It was formerly the Daily Worker, before being renamed in 1966.
- The News Line – from the Workers Revolutionary Party. Previously Workers Press. [Newsfeed updated daily online but limited print circulation.]

=== Weekly ===
- New Statesman – independent political and cultural magazine.
- The New Worker – from the New Communist Party of Britain.
- The Socialist – from the Socialist Party (England and Wales).
- Socialist Worker – from the Socialist Workers Party.
- Sunday Mirror – sister newspaper to Daily Mirror, published every Sunday.
- Weekly Worker – from the Communist Party of Great Britain (Provisional Central Committee).

=== Fortnightly ===
- The Communist – from the Revolutionary Communist Party
- Economic and Philosophic Science Review – formerly the journal of the International Leninist Workers Party, now an independent website.
- Scottish Socialist Voice – from the Scottish Socialist Party.
- Solidarity – from the Alliance for Workers' Liberty.

=== Monthly ===
- Labour Briefing – from the Labour Representation Committee.
- The Clarion – from socialist and Momentum activists in the Labour Party.
- New Internationalist – independent activist magazine.
- Socialism Today – from the Socialist Party (England and Wales).
- Socialist Alternative – from Socialist Alternative (England, Wales, and Scotland)
- Socialist Review – from the Socialist Workers Party.
- Socialist Standard – from the Socialist Party of Great Britain.
- Workers' Fight – from the British section of Internationalist Communist Union.

=== Bi-monthly ===
- Chartist – connected to the Labour Party.
- Fight Racism! Fight Imperialism! – from the Revolutionary Communist Group.
- Lalkar – formerly the journal of the Indian Workers' Association, now independent, but sympathetic to the CPGB(ML).
- New Left Review – independent New Left journal.
- Peace News – independent pacifist magazine "for nonviolent revolution".
- Proletarian – from the Communist Party of Great Britain (Marxist–Leninist).
- Scottish Left Review – independent magazine.
- Socialist Resistance – from the group of the same name.
- Workers – from the Communist Party of Britain (Marxist–Leninist). Previously, The Worker.
- Workers Power – from Workers Power.

=== Quarterly ===
- Tribune – democratic socialist Labour movement newspaper, with Labour Party connections.
- Ceasefire Magazine – independent magazine.
- Communist Review – from the Communist Party of Britain.
- Fabian Review – from the Fabian Society.
- Fadew – published from Bradford with the subtitle: Stories that matter.
- Green Socialist – Journal of the Alliance for Green Socialism (AGS).
- Historical Materialism – journal.
- In Defence of Marxism – from the Revolutionary Communist International.
- International Socialism – from the Socialist Workers Party.
- Notes From Below – socialist publication for self-emancipation of the working class from capitalism and the state by the use of workers' inquiry.
- Race & Class – journal.
- Red Pepper – independent, originally monthly from 1994, relaunched as bi-monthly in 2007, currently a quarterly.
- rs21 – from Revolutionary Socialism in the 21st Century.
- Socialist Studies – from Socialist Studies.
- The Spokesman – independent journal.
- Workers' Hammer – from the Spartacist League.
- World Revolution – from World Revolution.
- Women's Fightback - from the Alliance for Workers' Liberty.

=== Tri-annually ===
- Capital & Class – from the Conference of Socialist Economists.
- Radical Philosophy – independent journal. Previously bi-monthly.
- Soundings – independent journal.
- Notes from Below – independent worker's inquiry journal.

=== Bi-annually ===
- Anarchist Studies.
- Organise! – from the Anarchist Federation.
- Revolutionary Perspectives – from the Communist Workers' Organisation.
- Socialist History – from the Socialist History Society.

=== Annually ===
- Critique: Journal of Socialist Theory – independent Marxist journal.
- Socialist Register – independent journal.

=== Frequently updated websites ===
- Black Isle Media (formerly Universal Credit Sufferer) – website run by an independent journalist in Culbokie, Scotland
- Bright Green – website discussing radical, democratic, and green politics, staffed primarily from members of green parties across the UK
- Bywire News – decentralised, democratic, independent news network, hosting The Media Fund partners, including Byline Times The Canary, Labour Buzz, Not the News, Business Wales, Our.London, and MRC
- Source (formerly CommonSpace) – A political analysis site owned by- but independent of- the Common Weal think tank. Source ceased publication in June 2021.
- Conter - cross-party Scottish platform for "anti-capitalist analysis and activism"
- The Canary – pro-Jeremy Corbyn Bristol-based website
- communist.red – news and analysis website by the Revolutionary Communist Party, linked with The Communist newspaper.
- Double Down News
- Europinion – left-wing newspaper featuring analyses and discussions of UK, European, and US politics.
- Evolve Politics – website run by two people in Nottingham and Peterborough
- Freedom – from Freedom Press. Also produces Freedom, the longest-running anarchist publication in the English language, as a bi-annual free print journal
- LabourList – an online news site focusing on the Labour Party, their activities and the trade unions.
- Left Foot Forward
- The New Pretender – online review supporting left populism in the British Isles
- Novara Media – left-wing online outlet
- The Skwawkbox – left-wing alternative news blog
- The Prole Star – left-wing alternative news blog

=== Unknown or irregular frequency ===
- Aufheben – independent libertarian communist journal. Occasional publication.
- Aurora – from the Communist Workers' Organisation.
- Black Flag – independent anarchist newspaper. Occasional publication.
- The Bristolian – independent website 'smiting the high and mighty', exposing the council, politicians and businesspeople in Bristol.
- Class Struggle – from Workers' Fight.
- Democracy and Class Struggle – Maoist website.
- Emancipation and Liberation – from the Republican Communist Network. Website; print edition unconfirmed.
- Hereford Heckler – independent anarchist newspaper from Herefordshire (originally bi-monthly).
- Internationalist Communist Forum – from Workers' Fight.
- Fifth International – from the UK-based League for the Fifth International.
- Notes from the Borderland – parapolitical magazine/website, with a left/green perspective.
- Problems – from the Ernest Bevin Society.
- Resistance – from the Anarchist Federation.
- Revolutionary Praxis – Maoist website.
- RIGD Media – Left wing alternative media website.
- Socialist Action – website of group of same name.
- Socialist Fight – online magazine and website.
- Socialist Voice – from the International Socialist League.
- Strike Back – Produced by IWW Scotland.
- Megaphone – from Socialist Students.
- Viewpoint Magazine – Marxist research collective.
- Workers' Weekly – from the Revolutionary Communist Party of Britain (Marxist–Leninist). [Online newsfeed - frequency varies. Print edition unconfirmed.]

== Defunct ==
=== Daily ===
- Daily Citizen (1912–1915)
- Daily Herald (1912–1964) – from the Trades Union Congress.

=== Weekly ===
- 7 Days (1971–1972) – independent journal.
- Arbeter Fraynd (1885–1914) – London-based Yiddish paper.
- The Bee-Hive – initially from the London Trades Council, then independent (1861–72).
- Bradford Pioneer – associated with the Independent Labour Party.
- The Call (1916–1920) – official organ of the British Socialist Party, replaced by The Communist.
- The Clarion (1891–1931) – independent.
- The Communist (1920–1923) – publication of the Communist Party of Great Britain, replaced by The Workers' Weekly.
- Forward (1906–53) – associated with the Scottish ILP and, later, the Scottish Labour Party.
- Justice (1884–1925) – from the Social Democratic Federation, British Socialist Party and National Socialist Party.
- Labour Elector (1888–1894).
- Labour Herald (1981–1985) – independent.
- Labour Leader (1887–1986) – originally The Miner; independent until acquired by the ILP. New Leader from 1920s; Socialist Leader from '40s to '70s.
- Labour Standard (1881–1885) – from the London Trades Council.
- Labour Weekly – official Labour Party newspaper which was closed in 1988.
- Militant (1964–1997) – from the Militant tendency (later Militant Labour, now the Socialist Party, new paper is The Socialist).
- The Newsletter – associated with the Socialist Labour League.
- News on Sunday (1987) – independent.
- Northern Star (1837–1852).
- The Poor Man's Guardian (1831–1835).
- Red Weekly (1973–1977) – from the International Marxist Group
- Reynolds News (1850–1967) – independent until acquired by the Co-operative Press.
- Socialist Commentary (1934–1978) – from the Socialist Vanguard Group.
- Socialist Organiser – from the Socialist Organiser Alliance.
- Socialist Press – from the Workers' Socialist League.
- Sunday Worker (1924–1929) – from the National Left-Wing Movement, a CPGB front organisation.
- The Week (1933–1941).
- The Week (1964–1968) – publication of the International Group (later the International Marxist Group).
- The West Indian Gazette (1959–1968).
- The Worker (1915–1916) – journal of the Clyde Workers' Committee.
- Workers' Dreadnought (1917–1924) – originally independent, later from the Communist Party (British Section of the Third International).
- Workers' Life (1927–1930) – from the Communist Party of Great Britain.
- Workers News Bulletin – from the Workers League, a successor group to the Leninist League.
- Workers' Weekly (1923–1927) – from the Communist Party of Great Britain.
- Workers Weekly – from the Revolutionary Socialist Party.
- World News – from the Communist Party of Great Britain.
- Young Socialist – from the Workers Revolutionary Party.

=== Fortnightly ===
- Class Struggle (1973–1987) – from the Revolutionary Communist League of Britain.
- Germinal (1900–1908) – Yiddish anarchist journal.
- The International – from a faction of the Independent Labour Party.
- Socialist Appeal (1941–1948) – from the Workers' International League/Revolutionary Communist Party.
- Revolution – from the Scottish section of the International Marxist Tendency. Merged with Socialist Appeal to form The Communist.
- Socialist Appeal (1992–2024) – from the British section of the International Marxist Tendency, merged with Socialist Appeal to form The Communist.

=== Monthly ===
- Anarchy (1961–1985).
- Anarchist Worker (1975–1977) – from the Anarchist Workers Association.
- The Catalyst – from the Solidarity Federation.
- Communiqué – from the International Socialist Group (Scotland).
- Controversy (1937-) – ILP-associated journal.
- Gagged! – from South Wales Anarchists.
- International (1964–1984) – from the International Group/International Marxist Group/Socialist League. Irregular publication after 1970.
- Keep Left (1950–1985) – youth paper from The Club/Socialist Labour League/Workers Revolutionary Party.
- Labour Monthly (1921–1962) – associated with the Communist Party of Great Britain.
- Libertarian Struggle (1973–1975) – from the Organisation of Revolutionary Anarchists.
- Liberty (1894–1896) – anarchist journal, previously bi-monthly.
- Marxism Today (1957–1991) – from the Communist Party of Great Britain.
- Militant International Review – from the Militant Tendency.
- New Times – from the Democratic Left.
- The Leninist – from the group that became the Communist Party of Great Britain (Provisional Central Committee).
- The Leveller (1976–82) – coalition of radicals, socialists, Marxists and feminists.
- Living Marxism/LM (1988–2000) – magazine of the Revolutionary Communist Party.
- London Workers' Broadsheet – from a forerunner of the Working People's Party of England.
- The Next Step – from the 1980s Revolutionary Communist Party.
- Revolution – from the British section of Revolution.
- The Social Democrat (1897–1911) – theoretical journal of the Social Democratic Federation, later the British Socialist (1912–).
- The Socialist – from the Socialist Labour Party (1903).
- The Socialist – from the Fife Socialist League.
- Socialist Campaign Group News – from the Socialist Campaign Group of the Labour Party.
- Socialist Outlook (1987–1991) – from the International Socialist Group. Later bi-monthly.
- Socialist Youth – from the Labour Party Young Socialists.
- Straight Left – from the eponymous group associated with the Communist Party of Great Britain.
- The Syndicalist – from the Industrial Syndicalist Education League.
- To-day (1884–1889) – associated with the Social Democratic Federation. Later the International Review.
- Workers Liberty – from the Alliance for Workers' Liberty.

=== Bi-monthly ===
- The Fargate Speaker – from the Sheffield group of the Anarchist Federation.
- International (1985–1987) – from the International Group.
- Socialist News – from the Socialist Labour Party.
- Workers International Review (1958) from the Revolutionary Socialist League
- Workers' Power – from Workers' Power.

=== Quarterly ===
- Challenge – from the Young Communist League.
- Direct Action – from the Solidarity Federation.
- International Communist (1976–1979) – from the International-Communist League.
- Marxist International Review – from the International Marxist Tendency.
- Marxist-Leninist Quarterly – from the Communist Federation of Britain (Marxist-Leninist).
- New Reasoner (1957–1959) – forerunner of New Left Review.
- The Raven: Anarchist Quarterly (1987–2003).
- Socialist Youth – from the International Socialist Resistance.
- Workers Action (1997–2006) – from the Workers' International League; later bi-annual.

=== Bi-annually ===
- Gay Left (1975–1980) – journal by the group of the same name.

=== Unknown or irregular frequency ===
- Africa in Struggle (1975–1978) – from the International Marxist Group.
- Agitator – forerunner of Solidarity, from the Solidarity group.
- Alert Scotland – from the Communist Party of Scotland.
- Another Angry Voice – website run by an English tutor in Yorkshire
- A Pinch of Salt (1985–1989/2007–2011) – from Christians Interested in Anarchism.
- Big Flame – from Big Flame.
- The Black Dwarf (1968–1972) – associated with the International Marxist Group.
- Bread & Roses – from the Industrial Workers of the World.
- The British Revolutionary Socialist – from the Revolutionary Socialist Party.
- Bulletin of Marxist Studies/Marxist Studies Newsletter (1968–1970) – from the International Revolutionary Marxist Tendency, an IMG/USFI splinter group.
- Bulletin for Socialist Self-Management (1972–1973) – continuation of Bulletin of Marxist Studies/Marxist Studies Newsletter.
- Class Against Class – journal from the Marxist-Leninist Organisation of Britain.
- Class War (1983–2011) – from the eponymous group.
- Combat – journal from the Communist League of Great Britain.
- The Commonweal (1885–1893) – from the Socialist League.
- Common Wealth Review (1944–1949) – journal of the Common Wealth Party.
- The Commune – from the Anti-Parliamentary Communist Federation.
- The Communist (1919) – from the Communist League.
- The Communist – from the British and Irish Communist Organisation.
- Communist – theoretical journal of the Straight Left group.
- Compass – journal from the Communist League of Great Britain.
- Confrontation (1986–1990) – journal of the Revolutionary Communist Party.
- Counter Information – Independent news sheet from 1980 to 2004 about grassroots struggles in the UK and worldwide.
- Direct Action – from the Anarchist Federation of Britain, precursor to the Syndicalist Workers' Federation.
- Dundee and Tayside Vanguard – from the Workers Party of Scotland.
- The Fargate Speaker – from the Sheffield group of the Anarchist Federation.
- Fight (1936–1938) – from the Marxist Group and later Revolutionary Socialist League.
- Fightback – from Communist Forum.
- Finsbury Communist – from the Finsbury Communist Association.
- Fourth International (1958–1962) – from the Revolutionary Socialist League (UK, 1957)
- Fourth International (1964–1982) – from the (UK-based) International Committee of the Fourth International.
- Fourth Internationalist – from the Socialist Labour Group.
- Dos Fraye Vort (1898) – Yiddish anarchist newspaper.
- Freiheit (1879–1910) – anarchist journal.
- Frontline – journal of Red Flag tendency within Scottish Socialist Party.
- Green Anarchist – independent journal.
- Hammer or Anvil – from the Action Centre for Marxist-Leninist Unity.
- Heatwave (magazine) (1966) – libertarian socialist journal.
- Heavy Stuff – theoretical journal of the Class War Federation.
- Here and Now – associated with the Solidarity group.
- The Industrialist – from the Industrialist League.
- The Industrial Unionist – from the British Advocates of Industrial Unionism.
- International Bulletin/The Bulletin (1961–1963) – from the International Group (pre-IMG).
- International Communist Review – from the Communist Workers' Organisation.
- International Review – from the Revolutionary Communist League of Britain.
- International Socialist (1952–1954) – from the (pre-Revolutionary Socialist League (UK, 1957)) International Socialist Group.
- Labour Review (1952–1963) – The Club/Socialist Labour League.
- Left (1942–1947) – journal of the Common Wealth Party.
- The Libertarian (1950–1988) – periodical of the Common Wealth Party.
- Libertarian Communism (1972–1976) – unofficial journal associated with the Socialist Party of Great Britain.
- Libertarian Communist (1977–1980) – from the Libertarian Communist Group.
- The Line of March – from Revolutionary Communist Party of Britain (Marxist–Leninist).
- The Marxist – independent journal.
- The Marxist – from the Marxist Party.
- Marxist Bulletin (1970s) – from the Bulletin Group.
- Marxist Bulletin (1997–2000) – from British-based supporters of the International Bolshevik Tendency.
- Marxist-Leninist Journal – from the Revolutionary Communist Party of Britain (Marxist-Leninist).
- Marxist Worker – from the eponymous group.
- The Militant (late 1940s) – entrist paper from the Revolutionary Socialist League/Revolutionary Communist Party.
- Militant Miner – from the Left Fraction.
- New Age – from the Communist Workers Movement, a split from the CPB(ML).
- New Communist Review – theoretical journal of the New Communist Party.
- The New Man – from the Marxian League.
- New Interventions – independent Trotskyist journal.
- The Newsletter (1956–1969) – from The Club/Socialist Labour League.
- October – journal from the Revolutionary Communist League of Britain.
- Open Polemic – from the Association of Communists for Revolutionary Unity.
- Permanent Revolution – journal from the 1970s Workers' Fight group.
- Permanent Revolution – journal from Workers' Power.
- Permanent Revolution – from the eponymous group.
- Plebs – from the Plebs' League.
- Politics – from the Left Fraction.
- Der Poylisher Yidl (1884–1885) – Yiddish periodical newspaper.
- Proletarian – from the Communist Organisation in the British Isles.
- Proletarian – from the 1980s group of the same name.
- The Proletariat – from the Revolutionary Socialist Party.
- Rally (1940s–1960s) – entrist paper in the Labour Party Young Socialists from the group which became the Revolutionary Socialist League (UK, 1957).
- The Reasoner (1956) – forerunner of New Reasoner.
- Rebel – entrist paper in the Labour Party Young Socialists from the International Socialists.
- Red Clydesider – from the Workers Party of Scotland.
- Red Action (1981–2001) – from the eponymous group.
- Red Flag (1933–1937) – from the Communist League/Marxist League.
- Red Flag (1963–2000) – from the Revolutionary Workers' Party.
- Red Front – from the Marxist-Leninist Organisation of Britain.
- Red Mole (1970–1973) – from the International Marxist Group.
- Red Rag (1972–1980) - socialist feminist magazine associated with the CPGB.
- The Red Republican (1850).
- Red Star (2004–2005) – from the Red Party.
- Red Vanguard – from the Marxist-Leninist Organisation of Britain.
- Republican Worker – from the Revolutionary Democratic Group.
- Revolution (1976–1980) – journal from the Communist Federation of Britain (Marxist-Leninist)/Revolutionary Communist League of Britain.
- Revolutionary Communist Papers (1977–1981) – journal of the Revolutionary Communist Tendency.
- Revolutionary Fighter – from the Revolutionary Internationalist League, a split from Workers' Internationalist League.
- Revolutionary History – independent Trotskyist journal.
- Revolutionary Socialism – from Big Flame.
- Scientific Socialism – from the Association for the Realisation of Marxism.
- Scottish Marxist – Scottish journal of the Communist Party of Great Britain.
- Scottish Marxist Voice – from the Communist Party of Scotland.
- Scottish Vanguard – from the Workers Party of Scotland.
- Searchlight – entrist paper from the Workers' International League.
- The Sheffield Anarchist (1891; 1975–1987).
- Slaney Street – independent, Birmingham based free newspaper.
- Socialism from Below – from the Anarchist Workers' Group, a split from the Direct Action Movement.
- The Socialist – from the Socialist Union.
- Socialist Action (1976–1982) – from the League for Socialist Action.
- Socialist Challenge (1977–1983) – from the International Marxist Group.
- Socialist Current (1956–) – eponymous journal of a group which split from the Revolutionary Socialist League.
- Socialist Democracy – from the Socialist Democracy Group.
- Socialist Fight (1940s) – from the Socialist Workers Group, a split from the Revolutionary Socialist League (UK, 1938).
- Socialist Fight (1957–1964) – from the pre-Militant Revolutionary Socialist League (UK, 1957).
- Socialist Future Review (1985–2005) – from the Movement for a Socialist Future.
- Socialist Lawyer – from the Haldane Society of Socialist Lawyers.
- Socialist Newsletter – from the Socialist Labour Group.
- Socialist Outlook (1948–1954) – from The Club.
- Socialist Review (1950–1962) – from the Socialist Review Group.
- Socialist Studies – from the United Socialist Party.
- Socialist Viewpoint – from the Socialist Group.
- Socialist Woman (1969–1978) – from the International Marxist Group.
- Solidarity – from the Workers' Revolutionary League.
- Solidarity – from the Solidarity group.
- South London Workers' Bulletin – from the Workers' Institute of Marxism–Leninism–Mao Zedong Thought.
- Spain and the World (1936–1939).
- The Spectre (1975–1977) – from the Revolutionary Marxist Current, a split from the International Marxist Group.
- The Spur – associated with the Anti-Parliamentary Communist Federation.
- Struggle – from the Communist Federation of Britain (Marxist-Leninist).
- Student Socialist – from Socialist Students.
- Trotskyism Today – journal of the Workers' Socialist League.
- Trotskyist Internationalist – from Workers' Power.
- Unite and Fight – from the Socialist Labour Group.
- Universities and Left Review (1957–1959) – forerunner of New Left Review.
- The Vanguard – paper associated with John Maclean.
- Vanguard – from the Committee to Defeat Revisionism, for Communist Unity.
- Vietnam Solidarity Committee Bulletin (1966–1970) – from the eponymous group linked to the Vietnam Solidarity Campaign.
- Voice of Labour – from the Left Fraction.
- Voice of the People – from the Communist Workers League of Britain (Marxist–Leninist).
- What Next – independent Trotskyist journal.
- The Whinger – independent journal.
- Wildcat – associated with the Solidarity group.
- Womens Voice – from the IS/Socialist Workers Party.
- The Word – from the United Socialist Movement.
- Workers' Fight – from the 1930s Revolutionary Socialist League.
- Workers' Fight – from the 1960s/1970s Workers' Fight group.
- Workers' International News (1938–1949) – from the Workers' International League/Revolutionary Communist Party.
- Workers' International News – from the Workers' Internationalist League.
- Workers' News – from the Workers League.
- Workers' News (1987–1997) – from the Workers' International League.
- Workers' Newsletter – from the Working People's Party of England.
- Workers Press (1985–1996) – initially a rival to News Line, from the group that became Movement for Socialism.
- Workers' Review – from the Socialist Workers League, a successor to the Leninist League.
- Workers' Unity – from the Communist Unity Association (Marxist-Leninist).
- Workers' Voice – from the Communist Workers' Organisation.
- World Politics (1965–1967) – from the International Marxist Group.
- Young Guard (1962–1966) – entrist paper in the Labour Party Young Socialists.
- Youth for Socialism – entrist paper in the Labour Party Young Socialists from the pre-Revolutionary Socialist League (UK, 1957).

== See also ==
- List of newspapers in the United Kingdom
- List of newspapers in Scotland
- List of newspapers in Wales
- British Left
