= Far-left politics in the United Kingdom =

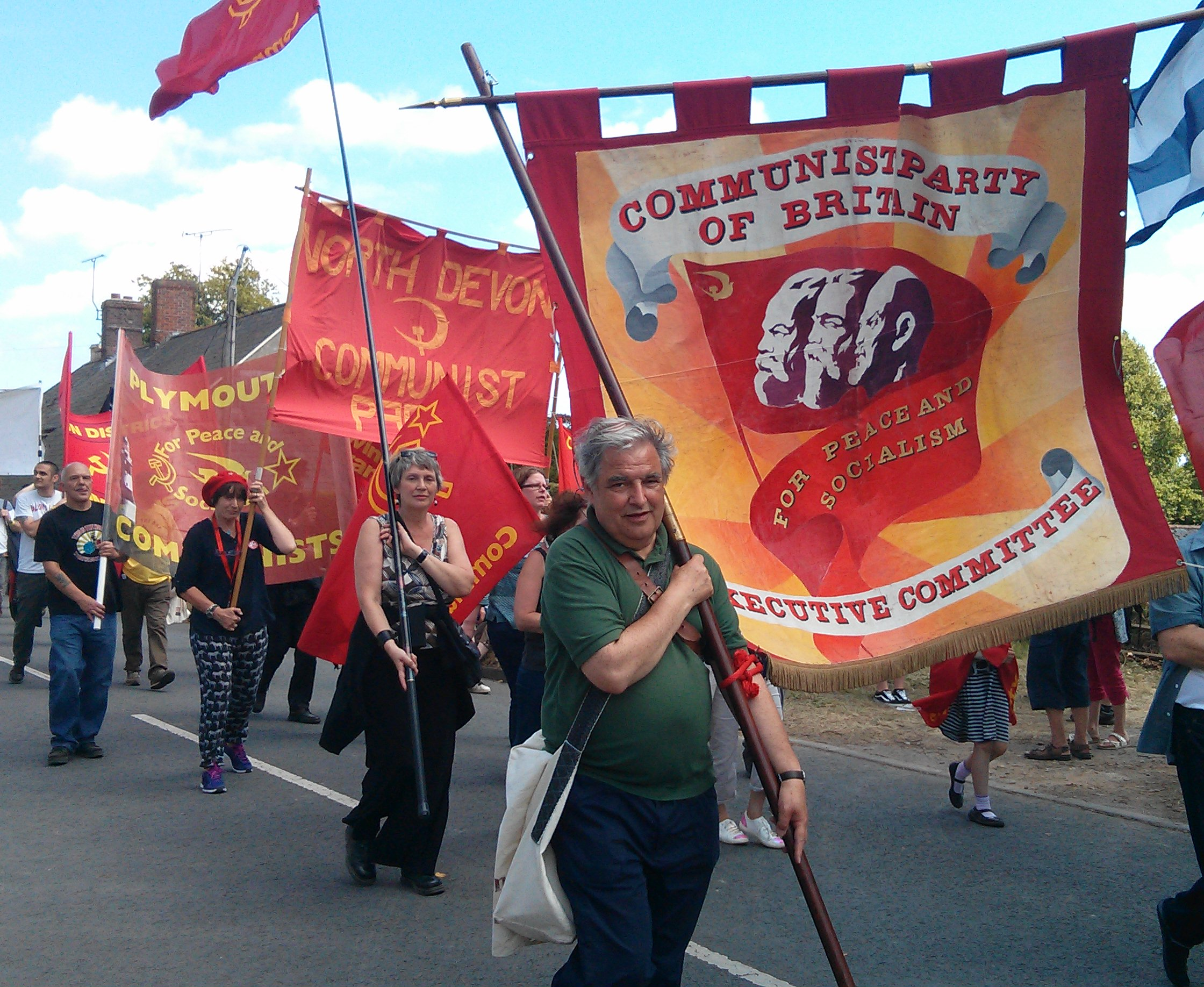
Members of the far-left Communist Party of Britain at the Tolpuddle Martyrs' Festival

Far-left politics in the United Kingdom have existed since at least the 1840s, with the formation of various organisations following ideologies such as Marxism, revolutionary socialism, communism, anarchism and syndicalism.

Following the 1917 Russian Revolution and developments in international Marxism, new organisations advocated ideologies such as Marxism–Leninism, Left Communism and Trotskyism.

Following the Chinese Communist Revolution, further international developments from the 1960s led to the emergence of Maoist and later Hoxhaist groups. Political schisms within these tendencies created a large number of new political organisations, particularly from the 1960s to the 1990s.

== Definition ==
Ian Adams, in his Ideology and Politics in Britain Today, defines the British far-left as primarily those political organisations which are "committed to revolutionary Marxism." He names specifically "orthodox communists, those influenced by the New Left Marxism of the 1960s, followers of Trotsky, of Mao Tse-tung, of Fidel Castro, and even Enver Hoxha." He stated that although the British far-left is "highly complex", the main division is between the orthodox communists (i.e. Marxist-Leninists, sometimes called "Stalinists") and Trotskyists. John Callaghan likewise focuses his The Far Left in British Politics on the five largest Marxist organisations, namely the 'official' Communist Party and the four most influential Trotskyist groups. However, Evan Smith in Against the Grain: The British Far Left from 1956, uses the term 'far left' "to encompass all of the political currents to the left of the Labour Party," including "anarchist groups".

The scope of this article limits the discussion of far left politics to the period since 1801 i.e. the formation of the United Kingdom. However at least one historian has identified the existence of a 'far left' in England as early as the 1640s.

== History ==
The early 19th century saw a series of "popular disturbances", concerning mostly economic grievances and with little formal ideology or organisation (Luddites; Swing Riots; risings in Scotland and Wales), or which were related to reformist campaigns around legislation such as the Corn Laws, Reform Bills and Poor Law. There were also revolutionary conspiracies by small groups of radicals (Despard, Spa Fields, Cato Street) during and after the Napoleonic Wars. Chartism, however, was the first working class-led movement combining a national political organisation with what were arguably revolutionary aims. However, even the politics of the minority of 'physical force' Chartists who plotted the abortive risings of 1839, 1840, 1842 and 1848 were largely Radical in nature and only a small number of Chartist leaders (O'Brien, Harney, Jones) moved towards Socialism. Far left politics such as revolutionary syndicalism were expressed in the trade union press from the early 1830s but were not the official policy of any organisation.

=== Background and early groups, 1840–1920 ===
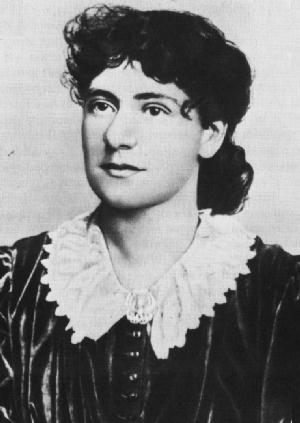
Eleanor Marx was a member of Britain's earliest Marxist parties.

Far-left political groups have been active in the UK since the mid-19th century, beginning with the League of the Just from 1840, and the Marxist Communist League from 1847; groups with emigre origins. This emigre tradition continued throughout the century, for example German anarchist Johann Most established his Freiheit journal in London in 1879; editors included the Belgian Victor Dave. English socialist John Goodwyn Barmby had founded the 'Communist Propaganda Society' as early as 1841, but its Christian/Owenite foundations saw it evolve into the 'Communist Church' by 1843; his newspaper "Communist Chronicle" was later republished by fellow Chartist, Thomas Frost, who followed it with his own, short-lived "Communist Journal".

The earliest avowedly-Marxist national political party in Britain was the Social Democratic Federation (SDF), founded by Henry Hyndman in 1881, initially as the Democratic Federation, and renamed following the affiliation of the Labour Emancipation League (LEL, formed 1880) in 1884. Karl Marx and Friedrich Engels did not participate in the new "Marxist" organisation but the SDF counted among its members Marx's daughter Eleanor for a time, before she, her husband Edward Aveling, William Morris and the LEL broke away to found the libertarian Socialist League. Both parties were notable for not being willing to collaborate with "bourgeois" parties such as the Liberals on issues of reform, but differed on the question of participation in elections, which a majority of the Socialist League opposed. The SDF stood in elections from 1885 but with no success. The Socialist League suffered splits and gradual disintegration from 1888 - including the formation of the Bloomsbury Socialist Society and Hammersmith Socialist Society - and from 1889 until its dissolution in 1892 was effectively an anarchist organisation.

Around the same time, reformist and ethical socialist groups emerged, such as the Fabian Society (1884) and Independent Labour Party (1893); the latter did not adhere strictly to the SDF's Marxist-derived scientific socialism and included a significant number of Christian socialists. An alliance between the three organisations did occur with the Labour Representation Committee in 1900, but this was not without tensions and led to fractures within the SDF.

The Social Democratic Federation also fractured over the issue of creeping reformism and also the Boer War of 1899–1902, with Hyndman himself eventually being less than enthusiastic about opposing it. The immediate issue which caused a significant portion of the hard left to split was the debate at the 5th Congress of the Second International in Paris, over the entry of Marxist Alexandre Millerand into the "bourgeois" French government of Pierre Waldeck-Rousseau. Those who opposed it, known as "Impossibilists", referred to supporters as "Opportunists" who were betraying revolutionary aims through class collaboration. Two notable groups broke with the SDF over this; the De Leonist-orientated Socialist Labour Party (SLP, formed 1903) of Neil Maclean (which also included James Connolly, later of Irish republican fame and was most prominent in Scotland) and the Socialist Party of Great Britain (formed 1904).

The period leading up to the First World War saw a renewal of industrial militancy outside of the mainstream Labour Movement's traditional commitment to parliamentary politics. The Industrialist League and Industrial Workers of Great Britain emerged in 1908-9 from the British Advocates of Industrial Unionism initially founded by the SLP. The Industrial Syndicalist Education League was formed the following year by dissident members of the SDF.

The SDF eventually morphed into a new Marxist party, the British Socialist Party, along with some members on the left of the ILP, with Hyndman leading. With the advent of the First World War conflict arose between "internationalist" and "national defence" factions, with Hyndman taking a nationalist stance. Vladimir Lenin, who had visited London six times from 1902 to 1911, was critical of this and supported the internationalists. Matters came to a head in 1916, when the defeated Hyndman left to found the National Socialist Party, while his internationalist opponents Alf watts, Zelda Kahan and Theodore Rothstein supported the Zimmerwald Conference. In Scotland, the BSP's John Maclean was involved in the Red Clydeside movement. From 1916 to 1920, the British Socialist Party would be the largest proto-communist party in Britain and, although affiliated to the Labour Party for the 1918 general election, was shortly afterwards the largest founding group of the Communist Party of Great Britain.

=== Marxist–Leninism in Britain, 1920–1947 ===
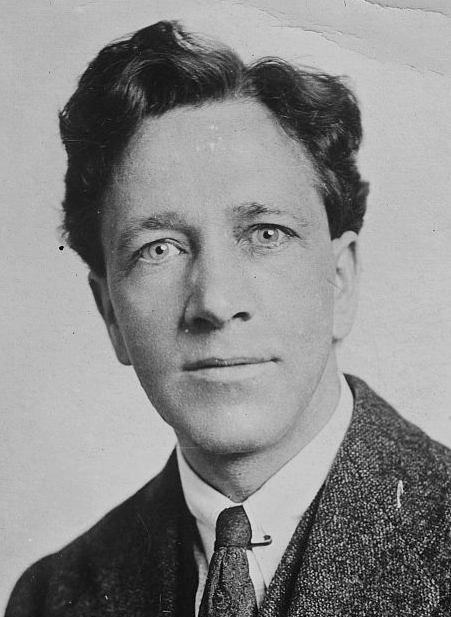
Arthur MacManus was the chairman of the Communist Party of Great Britain, until his 1927 death.

The Communist Party of Great Britain (CPGB) was officially established in 1920 as the British Section of the Communist International (also known as the Third International) and adopted the theories of Leninism. The largest chunk of its members came from the British Socialist Party; the internationalist faction which had ousted Hyndman in 1916. Other groups involved were the Communist Unity Group (primarily from Glasgow), which had split from the De Leonist Socialist Labour Party, represented by the likes of Arthur MacManus, Tom Bell and William Paul and also the South Wales Socialist Society, which mainly consisted of Welsh coal-miners.

Unity was not unanimous however, as some other groups were founded outside of CPGB control; the Communist Party of South Wales and the West of England, the Communist Labour Party (based in Scotland, featuring John Maclean) and the Communist Party (British Section of the Third International) (associated with suffragette Sylvia Pankhurst). There was also the Communist League of Guy Aldred, which included not only Marxists, but also anarcho-communists. By January 1921, most of the aforementioned groups had joined the CPGB, with the exception of the Communist League, which became the Anti-Parliamentary Communist Federation (which came to oppose Leninism).

The Labour Party leadership was unenthusiastic about the Bolsheviks' coup, and this in turn helped to exacerbated existing tensions between Labour and the far left. Since before 1900, one of the key issues splitting the British far left had been the attitude towards a trade union-based Labour Party, and such divisions had not been diminished once such an organization had been formed. The Labour leadership's lack of enthusiasm for the Bolshevik revolution, therefore, was the last straw for many BSPers.

— Andrew Thorpe, The British Communist Party and Moscow, 1920–43.

Studies of the period have revealed that in terms of participation, the Celtic fringe were over-represented, while the English were under-represented in the early days of British communism. In particular, the communists gained working-class support among the Welsh in the Rhondda Valley and the Scots in West Fife (both being major mining areas at the time). Some of the Irish Catholic diaspora, especially in the big industrial cities of Britain, also played a role. As well as this "Celtic" tinge, prominent in the East End of London (Hackney, Whitechapel and Bethnal Green) were Jewish diaspora who had recently fled pogroms in the Russian Empire. John Maclean; the revolutionary best regarded by Lenin and the Russian Bolsheviks; played no role in the CPGB. He had claimed that the party's first MP, Cecil L'Estrange Malone and leading figure, Theodore Rothstein (who also wrote for the Manchester Guardian), were "police spies"; they in turn claimed that he was insane after his time of mistreatment in prison. By 1923, Maclean had died so the issue was at an end.

The far-left were thrust into the spotlight in the lead up to the 1924 general election, with the appearance of the "Zinoviev letter" in the Daily Mail. The sitting Labour government of Ramsay MacDonald had earlier in the year recognised the Soviet government as legitimate and in the letter, supposedly written by Grigory Zinoviev (head of the Comintern) to Arthur MacManus, it stated improving British-Soviet relations would have the effect of "revolutionising of the international and British proletariat not less than a successful rising in any of the working districts of England." The implication from the conservative press was that MacDonald and Labour were a Trojan horse for Bolshevism. For his part Zinoviev denied authorship, but it was widely believed in Britain at the time. It would not be until the late 1960s that researchers challenged its authenticity more fully and it is today regarded as a forgery. A number of activists, including Albert Inkpin spent time in prison under the Incitement to Mutiny Act 1797 in the mid-1920s.

In the Soviet Union, Joseph Stalin was in the ascent and developed a policy of what is known as Stalinism; which the CPGB leadership upheld. Subsequently, internal divisions emerged, as the first official (endorsed by Leon Trotsky's International Left Opposition) British Trotskyist group, the Communist League, was founded in 1932. Some communists took part in the League against Imperialism, which primarily attacked the Franco-British empires. In the 30s, Communists and Trotskyists also worked within the Revolutionary Policy Committee and Guild of Youth inside the Independent Labour Party (ILP), in the Labour League of Youth, and within the Labour-affiliated Socialist League and Scottish Socialist Party.

In Europe, communist alternatives to liberalism were rivaled by ultra-nationalism; this included local variants such as the British Union of Fascists, whom the CPGB exchanged violence with (most famously at the Battle of Cable Street in 1936). The CPGB organised the British Battalion of the International Brigades, which took part in the Spanish Civil War. From 1939 to 1941, the Molotov–Ribbentrop Pact was in place; in response to CPGB General Secretary Harry Pollitt supporting the British declaration of war on Germany, he was replaced by Rajani Palme Dutt. With the launching of Operation Barbarossa, the position of the CPGB changed course swiftly; the Marxist-Leninists now backed the Allied cause in the Second World War against the Axis powers. As part of this Pollitt returned to the leadership.

The situation within British Trotskyism was more complex. There were two competing groups; the Revolutionary Socialist League (official representatives of the Fourth International, formed from a merger of various groups derived from the Communist League) and the Workers' International League. Trotskyists debated about whether the Soviet Union, despite Stalin, was worth defending. The WIL was pro-war, while the RSL was more fractured; the leadership adopted Trotsky's Proletarian Military Policy, while the Left Fraction and the Center supported "revolutionary defeatism." Polemics were exchanged and the CPGB attacked Trotskyists with the pamphlet "Clear Out Hitler's Agents". The Trotskyists unified as the Revolutionary Communist Party in 1944. The Allied victory in the war left the CPGB in its strongest position, with two MPs elected in 1945.

=== Dawning of the Cold War, 1947–1968 ===
Following the defeat of the Axis powers and the brief period of public prominence for the CPGB, the international political system realigned into the start of the Cold War, which pitted the Western Allies (including Britain), against the Soviet Union and the Eastern Bloc. There was an ideological component to this struggle, as a competition between the ideas of Marxist-Leninism and capitalism. As a consequent, in Britain anti-communist polemics became prominent in the 1950s. This did not just include the Tory right, but prominent elements of the mainstream Labour Party, such as Ernest Bevin, who viewed the United States instead as an ally. Partly in response to the anti-communist hysteria of the times, the CPGB created Britain's Road to Socialism in 1951 (replacing the earlier program For Soviet Britain), which stated that the party supported democratic socialism, with working-class leadership through the trade union movement. Espionage and counter-espionage took place between the Cold War powers during the period. Some of the most famous Soviet agents, working for the NKVD and KGB in Britain during the time were the Cambridge Five (most famously Kim Philby) and the Portland spy ring.

The New Reasoner was founded by ex-CPGB members in 1957 who created the New Left.

While Trotskyist groups had existed prior to the 1950s, it was during this time that the key figures who would go on to define British Trotskyism for decades and lead it to becoming the most prominent far-left tendency with the decline of Marxist-Leninism, namely Gerry Healy, Ted Grant and Tony Cliff, founded their own organisations. The Revolutionary Communist Party fractured over the topic of entryism into the Labour Party and on how to approach the Cold War and eventually coalesced around the entryist group The Club, in 1950. Cliff and Grant split the same year, forming the Socialist Review Group, and the International Socialist Group (later merged into the Revolutionary Socialist League), respectively. The Labour Party banned The Club's journal Socialist Outlook in 1954 and under Healy's leadership The Club would reemerge as an open political party, the Socialist Labour League (later the Workers Revolutionary Party) in 1959, who were associated with the Healy-led International Committee of the Fourth International. They were able to poach members of the CPGB after the tendency became fractured and demoralised by Nikita Khrushchev's 1956 speech On the Cult of Personality and Its Consequences.

According to George Matthews, Khrushchev made a deal with the CPGB to provide a secret annual donation of more than £100,000 in used notes. The year 1956 would be definitive in the history of the CPGB, however. Not only did they have to deal with the fallout of Khrushchev's aforementioned "secret speech", which attacked the legacy of Joseph Stalin, alienating those within the party who regarded Stalin as a great socialist, but also the crushing of the Hungarian Revolution of 1956 made some British communists uncomfortable, causing a membership drop. One of the most significant defections in the aftermath of this was the resignation of a number of Communist Party Historians Group intellectuals (with the exception of Eric Hobsbawm), who defined themselves as against "the tankies." They went on to found the New Left current; E. P. Thompson and John Saville founded the New Reasoner, which eventually became the New Left Review. They became associated with the broad pacifist group the CND. The New Left was co-founded by Gramscian-inspired Stuart Hall who played a key role in the introduction of identity politics currents such as cultural studies and is called the "godfather of multiculturalism."

For the more ardent Marxist-Leninists who lamented what they regarded as the revisionist slander against Stalin, the Sino-Soviet split allowed them the opportunity to align with the Chinese Communist Party and Mao Zedong as a suitable alternative to the Khrushchevite-Moscow line. In 1963, the Committee to Defeat Revisionism, for Communist Unity under Michael McCreery broke away from the CPGB to become the first British far-left grouping advocating Maoism. Although they, like future Maoist groups would remain very small factions on the far-left and would later fracture themselves. In the coming decades, it would be the Trotskyists who would benefit most from the decline of the CPGB.

=== 1968ers and ascent of Trotskyism, 1968–1991 ===
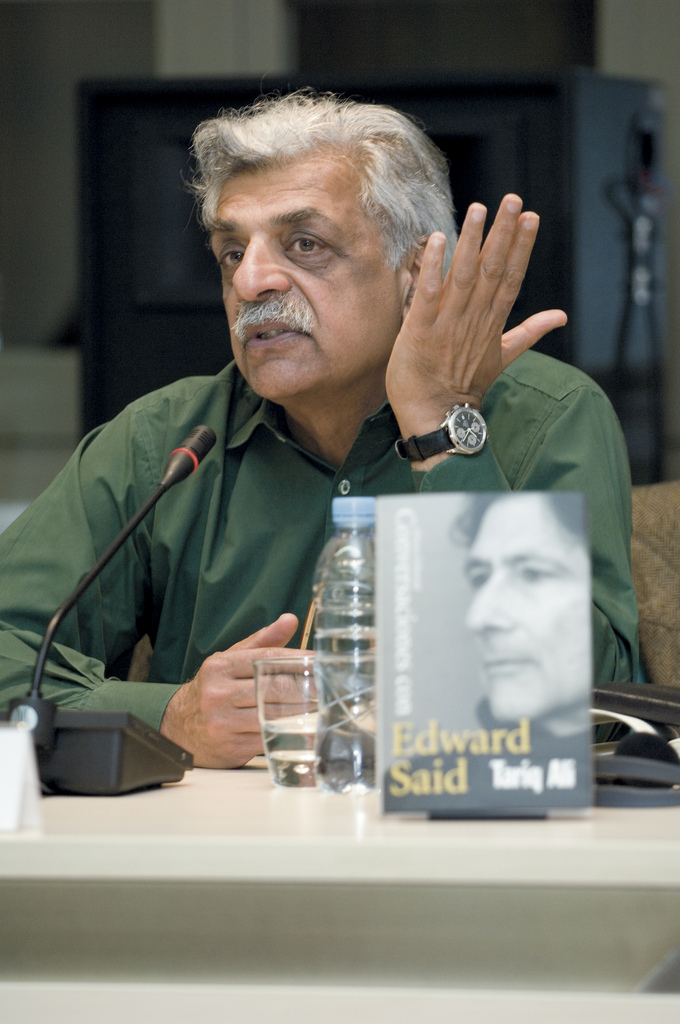
Tariq Ali of the Trotskyist IMG was one of the most prominent British figures of the Vietnam Solidarity Campaign.

A new generation of political activists emerged growing partly from the groundwork prepared by the earlier revisionism of the first New Left thinkers and were energised as part of a general opposition to the Vietnam War, with the Vietnam Solidarity Campaign being the most active (founded by what became the Trotskyist International Marxist Group). This was transformative for the British far-left. Anti-war activism also had the effect of radicalising student politics and leading to the re-politicisation of the National Union of Students; around the same time, the protests of 1968 were rocking the Western world. Tony Cliff's Trotskyist-orientated International Socialists (later known as the Socialist Workers Party) were able to recruit many students, while Healy's group opposed the protests and lost out.

In Continental Europe during the early 1970s, there were instances of the new radicalism turning into Marxist-Leninist paramilitary campaigns (such as the Red Brigades in Italy and the Baader-Meinhof Group in Germany). With the exception of the anarcho-communist Angry Brigade, the far-left in Britain did not widely engage in such activities. However, there were some, mainly ideological, connections to early phases of The Troubles and civil rights movement in Northern Ireland. For instance C. Desmond Greaves' Connolly Association (part of the CPGB) had an ideological influence on the Marxist-Leninist turn of Sinn Féin and the Irish Republican Army (which, following the split in the republican movement, became the Officials faction). Indeed, the perpetrator of the 1972 Aldershot bombing had spent time in the British Maoist CDRCU group. The non-communist Provisionals, who spearheaded the republican campaign, garnered "critical support" from some British Trotskyist groups, most prominently the IMG early on, under the rationale of anti-imperialism and much later in the 1980s had the Trotskyist-orientated People's Democracy merge into Provisional Sinn Féin.

For the CPGB, the significance of 1968 was different; in some ways a re-run of 1956, as Soviet tanks rolled into Czechoslovakia under the Brezhnev Doctrine in opposition to the Prague Spring. This time, the more liberal-reformist internal opposition, now known as Eurocommunists, remained within the CPGB and by the mid-1970s had further changed the party into a direction favoured by the earlier New Left. The Gramscian-Eurocommunists favoured the "cultural" politics of new social movements, such as feminism, environmentalism, anti-racism campaigns, student politics and gay rights (from 1975, backing the NUS) over militant working-class politics. Prominent figures in the Eurocommunist-push were Dave Cook, Sue Slipman and those associated with Martin Jacques's Marxism Today (the monthly theoretical journal of CPGB). More anti-revisionist Marxist-Leninist groups broke away such as Reg Birch's Communist Party of Britain (Marxist–Leninist) (initially pro-China Maoists, but later Hoxhaist after the Sino-Albanian split) in 1968 and Sid French's New Communist Party of Britain in 1977.

The 1970s also heralded the growth of the British far-right in the form of the National Front and the more establishment-based Conservative Monday Club. Building on from their new base in student politics, Trotskyist groups attempted to disrupt far-right groups organising (sometimes physically), which they deemed to be "racist or fascist." The IMG pioneered the No Platform policy, while Cliff's SWP created groups such as the Anti-Nazi League in 1975 and the Rock Against Racism festival in 1976 (attracting popular groups such as The Clash). Although SWP-controlled, these latter groups attracted a broader array of people to their protests against the far-right than just far-left activists. Indeed, involvement in race-related politics became more thematic during this period, including the campaign against apartheid in South Africa, supporting Black power movements, an Anti-Zionist approach to the Palestine-Israel conflict and further support for Irish republicanism. This led to some unorthodox alliances, such as David Yaffe's Trotskyist RCG supporting the Soviet Union's Comecon as a force of anti-imperialism (Frank Furedi's RCP; later creators of Living Marxism; split in 1978 over this).

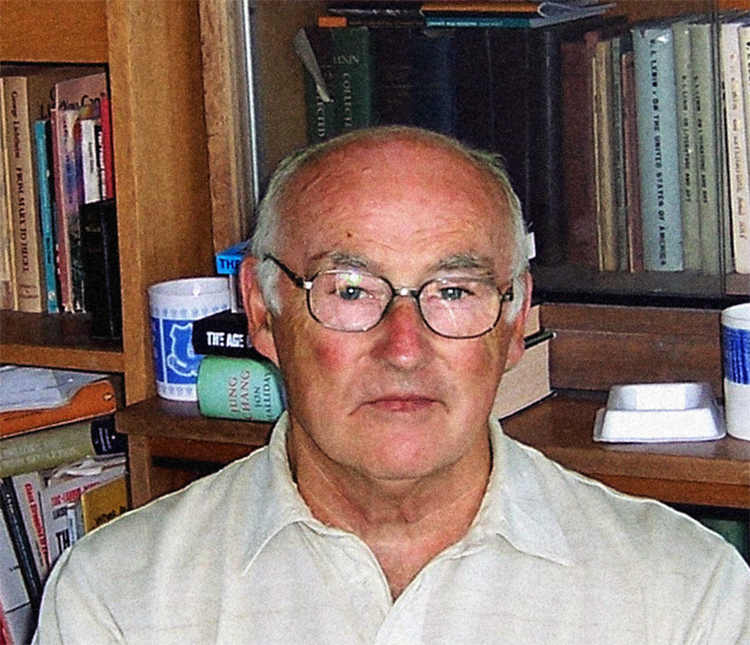
Peter Taaffe was the General Secretary of Militant. He had a significant influence over Liverpool City Council policies during the 1980s.

The decline of the CPGB and internal divisions between Eurocommunists and traditionalists were exemplified in the party's publications, with the Eurocommunists exercising control over the party's monthly theoretical journal Marxism Today and the traditional Marxist-Leninists having editorial control over the CPGB's daily newspaper Morning Star. Such divisions made it difficult for the party to deal with the ascent of Margaret Thatcher and her economic policies of neoliberalism; privatising major parts of the British industrial sector and moving towards a service economy. For instance, during the miners' strike of 1984–85, the divide between the factions meant that no effective program at the national level could be developed to aid the National Union of Mineworkers. The traditionalist faction formed the 'Communist Campaign Group' in 1985 and a new Communist Party of Britain (under Mike Hicks) in 1988, which it viewed as a "re-establishment" of the party.

Other major far left UK organisations also fragmented during the 1980s. The Workers Revolutionary Party suffered a series of splits into smaller factions from 1985, none of which retained its former prominence while the International Marxist Group also split from 1985 following its entrance (as the 'Socialist League') into the Labour Party. However, the Socialist Workers Party "largely failed to attract significant numbers of activists, despite the implosion of its IMG, WRP and CPGB rivals."

More successful for a time were the gains from Trotskyist entrism of Ted Grant and Peter Taaffe's Militant tendency. Working within the Labour Party, they were able to get Terry Fields, Dave Nellist and Pat Wall elected as MPs, as well as having major influence over Liverpool City Council, until Neil Kinnock moved to expel the organisation.

=== Since the Soviet dissolution, 1991–present ===
The dissolution of the Soviet Union; the world's first communist state; in 1991, following the Revolutions of 1989 and the policy of Perestroika under Mikhail Gorbachev, leading to the end of the Cold War, had a massive knock on effect on the world communist movement. In Britain, the Eurocommunist leadership of the Communist Party under Nina Temple officially dissolved the organisation in November 1991, abandoning all pretense of adherence to Marxist-Leninist politics. The CPGB was replaced by the "post-communist" think-tank, the Democratic Left which espoused adherence to feminism, green politics and democratic socialism. The remaining Straight Left faction under Andrew Murray continued on as the Communist Liaison Group instead, until eventually merging with the Communist Party of Britain in the mid-1990s. As well as this, some of the Scottish CPGB members founded the Glasgow-based Communist Party of Scotland in 1991 associated with Mick McGahey and Gordon McLennan, advocating Scottish independence from Britain. The name 'Communist Party of Great Britain' was taken up after 1991 by the CPGB-PCC, initially an antirevisionist group, formed around the publication of The Leninist (and later Weekly Worker), and from 2004 by the CPGB-ML, originally a Maoist group.

Starting in the mid-1990s, there has been a series of far left joint initiatives to build "alternative electoral vehicles" in the "political space outside of Labour" following Labour's continuing realignment to the political centre and crackdown on entryism. The latter had resulted in Militant's open turn and split in 1991 and the proscription of Socialist Organiser in 1990.

The first of these attempts at regroupment was the Socialist Labour Party (1996), led by Arthur Scargill, a left-wing (rather than far-left) party which was nevertheless the site of competing struggles for far left influence, and subsequent splits. This was followed by a succession of left-wing campaigns, coalitions and parties, and some also labelled as far-left, including Respect (2004) and the Trade Unionist and Socialist Coalition (2010). None of these achieved an electoral breakthrough, and with the ascendancy of Jeremy Corbyn to leadership of the Labour Party in 2015, the majority of groups to the left of the Labour Party (both left-wing and far-left) paused their activity. Some smaller groups such as Workers Power and Alliance for Workers' Liberty then dissolved or deregistered in order to enter or publicly support Labour.

Following the election of Keir Starmer as Labour leader in 2020, the party proscribed left-wing organisations including Socialist Appeal (in 2021) and Alliance for Workers' Liberty (AWL) (in 2022); the former, and Workers Power, subsequently relaunched independently. Other groups, including the AWL, continue to engage with Labour.

== See also ==
- 21st-century communist theorists
- Anarchism in the United Kingdom
- British Left
- Far-right politics in the United Kingdom
- Far-left politics in France
