= British left =

Political parties and movements in the UK

The British left, or the left in Britain, can refer to multiple concepts. It is sometimes used as shorthand for groups aligned with the Labour Party. It can also refer to groups and political parties that have sought egalitarian changes in the economic, political, and cultural institutions of the United Kingdom. There are various sub-groups, split between reformist and revolutionary viewpoints. Progressives and social democrats believe that equality can be accommodated into existing capitalist structures, but they differ in their criticism of capitalism and on the extent of reform and the welfare state. Anarchists, communists, and socialists, among others on the far left, on the other hand argue for abolition of the capitalist system.

== History ==
Leftism in the United Kingdom is thought to stretch back to the aftermath of the English Civil War in the 17th century, represented by groups such as the 'True Levellers' or Diggers. Chartism was one of the first post-civil war left-wing movements. Notions of socialism in Britain have taken many different forms from the utopian socialism and philanthropism of Robert Owen through to the reformist electoral project enshrined in the birth of the Labour Party. The Great Unrest of the pre-World War I years and the strikes of 1919 represented surges in left-wing activity. The Attlee ministry's establishment of the welfare-state is often considered a victory for the left. The New Left of 1968 represented another wave of activity. The miners' strike of 1984–85 saw the most recent large-scale working class movement; the anti-Poll Tax campaign of the late 1980s/early 1990s was also a significant left-wing social movement. The alter-globalisation and Occupy movements had a presence in Britain in the early-late 2000s, anti-austerity campaigns made up the bulk of the left's activity in the 2010s, and Black Lives Matter as well as pro-Palestine movements remain the largest movements of the 2020s.

=== Historical ===
- Anti-Poll Tax Federation
- Anti-Nazi League
- Awkward squad (trade unionists)
- Battle of Cable Street
- Chartism
- Communist Party of Great Britain
- Diggers
- General Strike
- Great Dock Strike
- Great Unrest
- Independent Labour Party
- Lesbians and Gays Support the Miners
- Levellers
- Merthyr Rising
- Miners' strike (1972)
- Miners' strike (1984–85)
- Peasants Revolt
- Peterloo Massacre
- Revolutionary Communist Party
- Social Democratic Federation
- Socialist League
- Tolpuddle Martyrs
- Vietnam Solidarity Campaign
- Workers' Socialist Federation

== Contemporary ==
- Campaign for Nuclear Disarmament
- Enough is Enough
- Extinction Rebellion
- People's Assembly Against Austerity
- Squatting
- Stop the War Coalition
- Trade unionism

== Key figures ==
The following is a list of figures significant for the British left.

=== Activists ===
- Mark Ashton
- Bob Crow
- Jessie Eden
- Jennie Formby
- Willie Gallacher
- Ken Gill
- Henry Gunter
- Hefina Headon
- Betty Heathfield
- Winifred Horrabin
- Claudia Jones
- Dorothy Kuya
- Jon Lansman
- Abraham Lazarus
- Norman Le Brocq
- Mikaela Loach
- Mick Lynch
- Len McCluskey
- Tom Mann
- Albert Meltzer
- Sylvia Pankhurst
- Betty Papworth
- Vanessa Redgrave
- Arthur Scargill
- Mark Serwotka
- Thora Silverthorne
- Norah Smyth
- Jessie Stephen
- Matt Wrack

=== Journalists ===
- Catherine Isabella Barmby
- Aaron Bastani
- Beatrix Campbell
- Paul Foot
- Owen Hatherley
- Mabel Hope
- C. L. R. James
- Owen Jones
- Alan McCombes
- George Monbiot
- Laurie Penny
- Charlotte Raven
- Ash Sarkar
- Mary Stanley Low
- Polly Toynbee

=== Politicians ===
- Diane Abbott
- Tony Banks, Baron Stratford
- Tony Benn
- Aneurin Bevan
- Harpal Brar
- Richard Burgon
- Andy Burnham
- Barbara Castle
- Jeremy Corbyn
- Stafford Cripps
- Frances Curran
- Kat Fletcher
- Michael Foot
- George Galloway
- Keir Hardie
- Eric Heffer
- Neil Kinnock
- Ian Lavery
- Clive Lewis
- Ken Livingstone
- Caroline Lucas
- Rebecca Long-Bailey
- John McDonnell
- Dave Nellist
- Zack Polanski
- Hannah Sell
- Dennis Skinner
- Zarah Sultana
- Peter Taaffe
- Emily Thornberry
- Nadia Whittome
- Ellen Wilkinson

=== Thinkers ===
- Tariq Ali
- Perry Anderson
- Sam Aaronovitch
- John Goodwyn Barmby
- Gurminder K. Bhambra
- Ian Birchall
- E.H. Carr
- Enid Charles
- G.D.H. Cole
- Maurice Dobb
- Terry Eagleton
- Mark Fisher
- Ralph Fox
- Paul Gilroy
- Kathleen Gough
- Stuart Hall
- David Harvey
- Margot Heinemann
- Christopher Hill
- Rodney Hilton
- Eric Hobsbawm
- John Holloway
- Victor Kiernan
- Ruth Kinna
- Ralph Miliband
- William Morris
- Rajani Palme Dutt
- Sheila Rowbotham
- George Rudé
- Raphael Samuel
- John Saville
- James Schneider
- Ambalavaner Sivanandan
- Cliff Slaughter
- E. P. Thompson
- Dorothy Thompson
- Dona Torr
- Raymond Williams

== Left-wing electoral organisations active in Britain ==
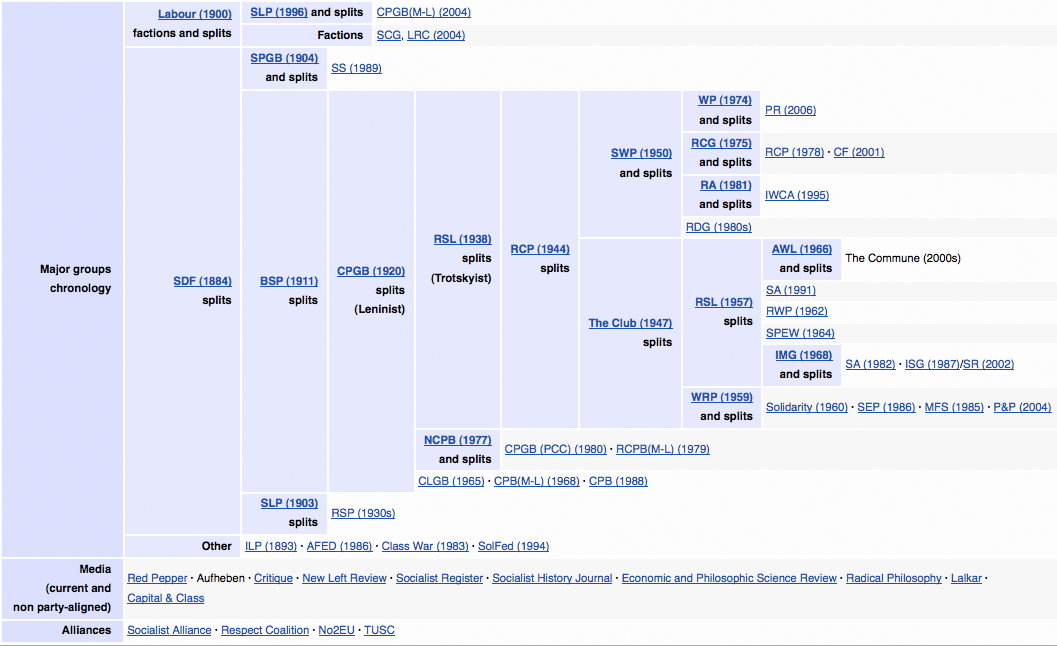
Timeline of parties in the broad socialist movement

The largest party on the British left is the left-wing Green Party of England and Wales. Following the most recent general election the Greens have 5 MPs.

The second largest party on the British left, by membership, is the centre-left Scottish National Party (SNP), which has 56,000 members despite only being active in Scotland. The SNP has 9 MPs.

The other four political parties on the left and with representation in the British parliament are the centre-left Social Democratic and Labour Party (SDLP) of Northern Ireland, the centre-left Plaid Cymru (only active in Wales), Sinn Féin (only active in Ireland), and Your Party. Plaid has 4 MPs, the SDLP has 2 MPs, Sinn Féin has 7 MPs (albeit it does not sit in Westminster as it refuses to take the parliamentary Oath of Allegiance), and Your Party has 1 MP. The Independent Alliance, with 5 MPs and formed following the 2024 general election, is a parliamentary grouping rather than a political party.

=== Labour Party ===
Labour Party individual membership, excluding affiliated members and supporters

Traditionally, the biggest party on the political left in the United Kingdom in terms of members and representation was the Labour Party, which was founded as the Labour Representation Committee (LRC) in 1900, however it is now generally viewed as a centrist party.

With the party's rebranding as New Labour in the 1990s under the leadership of Tony Blair, the party accepted a number of economic policies associated with the Right, causing it to be identified as centrist (Blair himself stated that his ministry would have governed from the political centre) rather than socialist, despite adding democratic socialism to the party's constitution, and was considered by fewer critics as being a party of the left; Blair described New Labour's ideology as Third Way, like Bill Clinton's Democratic Party in the United States. The Labour Party under Blair's leadership accepted many of the neoliberal economic policies enforced by the previous Conservative Party governments in the 1980s and 1990s, and continued in successive Conservative governments in the 2010s.

When Ed Miliband was elected as Leader of the Labour Party in 2010, he announced the abandonment of the New Labour agenda, and promised to return to socialism, clamp down on tax avoidance, introduce a wealth tax in the form of a mansion tax, raise income tax for high earners, and break up the banks. The party was subsequently criticised by some, including Blair himself, as straying leftwards from the centre ground of British politics, and that Miliband was a more traditional left-wing politician. Others disputed this view, and put Labour's loss at the 2015 United Kingdom general election down to the party being too right-wing.

Labour's status as a socialist party has been disputed by those who do not see the party as being part of the left, although the general consensus under Jeremy Corbyn was that Labour was closer to the Left on the left–right political spectrum. As a result of this, there has always been tension between the Left and the Labour Party. The Corbyn Labour Party leadership campaign, which led to a landslide victory at the 2015 Labour Party leadership election held in the month of September, represented a revival of the Labour left and led to a significant increase in membership; in the shadow cabinet reshuffle that followed, John McDonnell (chairman of the Labour Representation Committee) and Diane Abbott (member of the Socialist Campaign Group) were both appointed to Corbyn's shadow cabinet. While not winning, Labour made significant gains in terms of vote share and modest improvements in terms of seats, enough to deny a Conservative majority and led to a hung parliament, at the 2017 United Kingdom general election, which was taken as a vindication by some of the left turn. The party fell in the 2019 United Kingdom general election to its lowest share of seats since 1935, although it was not the party's worst election in terms of vote share (it did better than in 1931, 1983, 1987, 2010 and 2015 - and secured more actual popular votes than in 2024); many believe this was due to a complicated Labour Party manifesto and Brexit policy, a poor approach to campaigning, the unpopularity of Corbyn's leadership and an electoral system of First Past the Post that does not always reflect the popular vote.

In 2020, Keir Starmer became the Leader of the Labour Party and since then the party has become more "business-friendly" and moved to the political centre.

==== Internal groups ====
- Campaign for Labour Party Democracy
- Centre-Left Grassroots Alliance
- Labour Representation Committee
- Momentum
- Open Labour
- Socialist Campaign Group

==== Magazine support ====
- Chartist
- Tribune

=== Green Party of England and Wales ===
In 2015, the membership of the Green Party of England and Wales quadrupled, and its support in national opinion polls sextupled. Several factors contributed, including the collapse of the Lib Dem vote, the influence of social media and greater awareness among younger people about the rise of other left-wing parties in Europe such as: Podemos in Spain and Syriza in Greece, as well as a rise in anti-austerity movements across the UK and Europe. Other factors included the Scottish independence referendum, which proved to be an inspiration for a new kind of politics. Other key factors had been the contrast in conferences of the Green Party and Labour in September 2014, and the media exclusion of the Greens during and following their successes at the European elections; a petition against the media blackout of the Green Party reached 260,000 signatures.

The party also received a significant spike in membership during January 2015 following David Cameron's demand that the Greens be included in the leaders' debates for the 2015 general election. The Green Party has been included in a seven-way television debate. The Greens' 2015 spring conference had a record 1,300 members attend; the party became the second-largest of the European Greens in this period, as well as increasing significantly in national polls from an average 1% to 7%. It beat the Liberal Democrats to fourth place at the 2014 European Elections with 8%, under a proportional voting system, having a third MEP elected. However the Greens achieved only a 1.6% vote share at the 2017 general election, following a rejection by Labour of an election pact and an increase in vote share by the two major parties.

In the 2019 general election, the Green Party increased their vote share by 65% to 2.7%. In the 2021 United Kingdom local elections, the party made a net gain of 91 council seats, taking its national total to a record 444. In the 2024 general election the Green Party received 6.7% of the total vote, and elected 4 MPs. In the same year they achieved a total of 812 councillors.

==== Internal groups ====
- Greens Organise

=== Other organisations ===
The Workers Party of Britain was formed in December 2019. It is a socialist and socially conservative party. Its leader George Galloway briefly became the Member of Parliament for Rochdale in 2024, following a by-election.

The now defunct Respect Party (formed in 2004), which at one point had the support of other left groups (such as the Socialist Workers Party and Socialist Resistance) and some electoral success, lost its last local councillors in 2014 and its sole MP George Galloway – who was also the party leader. Respect disbanded after twelve years, on 18 August 2016.

The Trade Unionist and Socialist Coalition (TUSC), founded in 2010, comprises the Socialist Party, Socialist Workers Party and RMT trade union. As of 2016, TUSC had a small number of affiliated local councillors. Following the 2015 election of Jeremy Corbyn as Labour leader, TUSC floated plans for a future electoral pact with any Labour councillors standing on an anti-austerity platform; subsequently TUSC stood fewer candidates in the 2016 and 2017 local elections, based on a case by case reckoning of the political stance of local Labour candidates. In May 2017, TUSC confirmed that it would stand no candidates at the forthcoming general election, and give full support to Labour. In 2018, TUSC suspended electoral activity until further notice. In September 2020, TUSC became active once again as its steering committee agreed it would stand candidates in the 2021 local elections. In 2024, TUSC stood 40 candidates in the general election.

Left Unity was formed in November 2013 and backed by a number of existing left-wing parties. Left Unity had an electoral pact with TUSC for the 2015 elections but renounced independent electoral activity, in favour of Labour, under the Corbyn leadership.

The Communist Party of Britain (CPB), is a split from (and effectively the political successor to) the historical Communist Party of Great Britain, once the largest British far-left organisation. In 2017, the CPB announced that it would field no candidates at that year's general election, and give support to Labour instead. In 2024, the party fielded 14 candidates in the general election.

Some small left and far-left parties continue to contest elections independently, such as the Socialist Party of Great Britain (the oldest extant left-wing political party, having formed in 1904). Other parties and groups are electorally inactive, renounce participation in elections, or work unofficially in support of, or advocate a vote for, the Labour Party.

==== Electorally active parties ====
- Alliance for Green Socialism
- Communist League
- National Health Action Party
- Socialist Equality Party
- Socialist Labour Party
- Socialist Party of Great Britain
- Social Justice Party
- Trade Unionist and Socialist Coalition (TUSC)
- Transform
- Workers Party of Britain
- Workers' Revolutionary Party

===== Entryist groups within Labour Party =====
- Socialist Action

===== Parties working within Transform =====
- Breakthrough Party
- Left Unity

===== Parties working within TUSC =====
- Socialist Party (England and Wales)
- Socialist Party Scotland
- Socialist Workers Party [in Scotland only]

===== Others =====
- Alliance for Workers' Liberty
- Anarchist Federation
- Communist Party of Britain
- Communist Party of Britain (Marxist–Leninist)
- Communist Party of Great Britain (Marxist–Leninist)
- Communist Party of Great Britain (Provisional Central Committee)
- Communist Workers' Organisation
- International Socialist League
- New Communist Party of Britain
- Revolutionary Communist Group
- Revolutionary Communist Party of Britain (Marxist–Leninist)
- Socialist Alternative
- Socialist Resistance
- Solidarity Federation
- Spartacist League
- Workers' Fight
- Workers' Power

=== Active only in Scotland ===
- Republican Communist Network
- Scottish Greens
- Scottish Republican Socialist Movement
- Scottish Socialist Party
- Socialist Party Scotland

=== Local parties ===
- Old Swan Against the Cuts
- Mebyon Kernow (only active in Cornwall)
- West Dunbartonshire Community Party

== Media and culture ==
The following is a list of media organisations and other progressive British cultural outputs explicitly associated with the Left.

=== Comics ===
- Bill Bailey
- Frankie Boyle
- Jo Brand
- Steve Coogan
- Ben Elton
- Shappi Khorsandi
- Nish Kumar
- Stewart Lee
- Josie Long
- Alexei Sayle
- Linda Smith
- Kate Smurthwaite
- Mark Steel

=== Events ===
- Durham Miners' Gala
- Glastonbury Festival
- Tolpuddle Martyrs' Festival
- The World Transformed

=== Film ===
- I, Daniel Blake
- Pride (film)
- Danny Boyle
- Adam Curtis
- Ken Loach
- Mike Leigh

=== Television ===
- A Very British Coup
- Bill Brand
- Alan Bleasdale
- Boys from the Blackstuff
- Days of Hope
- Jimmy McGovern
- Our Friends in the North

=== Theatre ===
- Jim Allen
- Edward Bond
- Howard Brenton
- Caryl Churchill
- Shelagh Delaney
- Trevor Griffiths
- John McGrath
- Harold Pinter
- George Bernard Shaw

=== Independent news sources ===
- Byline Times (founded 2014)
- Evolve Politics (founded 2015)
- Left Foot Forward (founded 2010)
- Morning Star (Independent since 1945 but Britain's Road to Socialism, the programme of the CPB, underlies the paper's editorial stance)
- New Statesman (founded 1913)
- Novara Media (founded 2011)
- Red Pepper (founded 1995)
- The Canary (founded 2015)
- The Guardian
- Tribune

=== Journals ===
- Historical Materialism
- New Left Review
- Race & Class
- Socialist Register

=== Online content creators ===
- Hbomberguy
- Shaun (YouTuber)
- Abigail Thorn

=== Music ===
- Attila the Stockbroker
- Roy Bailey
- Chumbawamba
- The Clash
- Crass
- Crass Records
- Easterhouse
- Brian Eno
- Thee Faction
- Sam Fender
- Gang of Four
- The Housemartins
- Linton Kwesi Johnson
- Robb Johnson
- The Left Field
- John Lennon
- Ewan MacColl
- Paul McCartney
- Massive Attack
- McCarthy
- Radiohead
- The Redskins
- Red Wedge
- Rock Against Racism
- The Style Council

=== Literature ===
- W. H. Auden
- Alexander Baron
- Ralph Bates
- Julian Bell
- Simon Blumenfeld
- Edward Carpenter
- Sid Chaplin
- Christopher Caudwell
- John Cornford
- Len Doherty
- George Garrett
- David Gascoyne
- Walter Greenwood
- Harold Heslop
- Ethel Holdsworth
- Lewis Jones
- Mervyn Jones
- Jack Lindsay
- Hugh MacDiarmid
- Edith Nesbit
- George Orwell
- Edgell Rickword
- Michael Rosen
- Will Self
- John Sommerfield
- Gwyn Thomas
- Edward Upward
- H. G. Wells
- Oscar Wilde
- Chavs: The Demonization of the Working Class
- The Making of the English Working Class
- The Ragged-Trousered Philanthropists

=== Publishing Houses ===
- Pluto Press
- Verso Books

=== Publications affiliated to political organisations ===
- Emancipation and Liberation (Republican Communist Network)
- News Line (WRP)
- Scottish Socialist Voice (SSP)
- Socialist Resistance periodical by a group of the same name
- Socialist Standard (SPGB)
- Socialist Studies quarterly journal by a group of the same name
- Socialist Worker/Socialist Review (SWP)
- Solidarity (AWL)
- The New Worker (NCP)
- The Socialist (SP)
- Weekly Worker (CPGB-PCC)
- World Socialist Web Site (SEP)

=== Think tanks ===
- Compass ThinkTank
- Centre for Labour and Social Studies: CLASS
- Institute for Public Policy Research

== See also ==
- American Left
- Anarchism in the United Kingdom
- Another Europe Is Possible
- Anti-austerity movement in the United Kingdom
- Anti-nuclear movement in the United Kingdom
- Bookmarks
- Bread and Roses Award
- Bright Green
- Broad Left
- Compass
- Convention of the Left
- Edinburgh Coalition Against Poverty
- Far-left politics in the United Kingdom
- Gay Left
- Heatwave
- History of the socialist movement in the United Kingdom
- History of trade unions in the United Kingdom
- Levellers
- Liberation Left
- List of left-wing publications in the United Kingdom
- List of political parties in the United Kingdom
- List of trade unions in the United Kingdom
- Marx Memorial Library
- National Campaign Against Fees and Cuts
- New Labour
- New Left
- Owenism
- Peace and Justice Project
- Radical Whigs
- Republicanism in the United Kingdom
- Revolting Prostitutes
- Socialist Alliance
- Socialist Campaign Group
- Socialist Students
- The Left Field
- Trade unions in the United Kingdom
