= Socialist Democracy (disambiguation) =

Socialist democracy is a political system that aligns with principles of both socialism and democracy.

Socialist Democracy may also refer to:

- Socialist Democracy (Brazil)
- Socialist Democracy (Spain)
- Socialist Democracy of Guinea

== See also ==
- Social democracy (disambiguation)
- Socialist Democracy Group
- Socialist Democracy Party
