= Freedom and Revolution =

Freedom and Revolution (in Portuguese: Liberdade e Revolução) is a Marxist political grouping in Brazil, consisting mainly of members of the Socialist Democracy, and some former members of the Articulation of the Left, who have left or been expelled from the Workers' Party (PT) and joined the Socialism and Liberty Party (PSOL). Members include: senator Heloísa Helena, PSOL's chair; presidential candidate in 2006 election, the economist João Machado; the journalist Gilberto Maringoni. Members of Freedom and Revolution publish the online magazine Marxismo Revolucionario Atual.

Within Freedom and Revolution, supporters of the reunified Fourth International (FI) form a group called the "Socialist Democracy Collective - 4th International" which the FI's International Committee in a resolution dated February 2006 referred to as "Another sector of the FI in Brazil" beside the largest group of FI members, Socialist Democracy.
