= Convention of the Left =

The Convention of the Left (CL) is an annual conference of British left, socialist, progressive and green parties and organisations, first held in Manchester in September 2008. The format of the conference was that it 'shadowed' the Labour Party's 2008 Annual Conference, also being held in the city. A 'recall' event was held in the city in January 2009.

== Aims and values ==
The 'Statement of Intent' for the Convention was that it aimed to "explicitly challenge Labour's programme of warmongering, neoliberal privatisation and failure to tackle environmental destruction." The statement was signed by:

- Tony Benn
- Alice Mahon
- Ken Loach
- John McDonnell MP (Labour Representation Committee)
- Robert Griffiths (General Secretary, Communist Party of Britain)
- John Haylett (Editor, Morning Star)
- Liz Davies
- Derek Wall (former Principal Male Speaker, Green Party of England and Wales)
- George Galloway (Respect politician)
- Salma Yaqoob
- Prof. Gregor Gall (Labour movement academic)
- Chris Bambery (former editor, Socialist Worker)
- Lindsey German (Counterfire)

== Membership ==
While the CL had managed to attract the support of both Respect Renewal and the Socialist Workers' Party (at that point engaged in a protracted dispute over the demerger of the Respect – The Unity Coalition), the Communist Party of Great Britain (PCC) dismissed the event as a "talking shop" (it supporting the Campaign for a Marxist Party against "broad fronts" and for deeper discussion on differences on the Left), however the CPGB (PCC) and its autonomous student group Communist Students signed up as supporters of the convention. The Socialist Party did not sponsor the event as it has its own Campaign for a New Workers' Party and invited the organisers to join their campaign.

The full list of supporting party organisations is as follows:

- Alliance for Green Socialism
- Alliance for Workers' Liberty
- A World to Win
- Campaign for a New Workers' Party
- Communist Students
- Communist Party of Britain
- Communist Party of Great Britain
- European Left Party Network
- Labour Representation Committee
- Left Alternative
- Permanent Revolution
- Respect – The Unity Coalition
- Scottish Socialist Party
- Socialist Alliance
- Socialist Resistance
- Socialist Workers' Party
- Solidarity
- Workers Power

It was also supported by Morning Star, Red Pepper, Labour Briefing and Socialist Worker.
