= Socialist democracy =

Form of democracy emphasizing socialism

Socialist democracy, or social democracy in early writings, is a political system that aligns with principles of both socialism and democracy. Democracy is a key component of most schools of thought within socialism, including variants of Marxism, anarchism, and reformism.

Democratic socialists and social democrats of various tendencies—including Trotskyist, libertarian, and reformist—have often deemed "socialist democracy" synonymous with either multi-party representative democracy or direct democracy, complemented by economic democracy as worker's control or social ownership of production, such as in the form of worker-owned cooperatives, workers' councils, democratic trade unions, state-owned enterprises, consumer-owned cooperatives and credit unions, or sovereign wealth funds. Liberal socialists, like John Stuart Mill and Robert Dahl, often argue that socialist democracy is a natural extension of representative-democratic principles to the economic realm.

On the other hand, Marxist–Leninists frequently use the term to specifically refer to the one-party systems found in many Marxist–Leninist states. Under this view, as the communist party is the only party that can represent the interests of the people, a multiparty system would simply allow counterrevolutionary elements to revert the system into bourgeois democracy, authoritarian capitalism, or feudalism. The Socialist Federal Republic of Yugoslavia (1945–1992), for example, styled itself a socialist democracy, and implemented some elements of economic democracy with its policy of "socialist self-management" under a market socialist system. The People's Republic of China formally proclaims socialist democracy in the form of a people's democratic dictatorship in its constitution and public policies. Essentially all communist states have claimed socialist democracy.

Marxists of all schools generally view the dictatorship of the proletariat as the highest form of democracy, in the sense that the proletariat (industrial working class, or the masses) has displaced the bourgeoisie (owners of capital, or the elite) as those in control of political and economic affairs. Anarchists generally reject the "dictatorship of the proletariat" for implying the necessity of state power, thus arguing instead for direct democracy, consensus, or other non-hierarchical alternatives.

Numerous major parties and groups officially accept the principle of socialist democracy, including but not limited to: the Democratic Socialists of America, Die Linke, the Cuban Communist Party, the Chinese Communist Party, the Red–Green Alliance (Denmark), Socialist Alliance (Australia), the Workers' Party (Brazil), and the Fourth International (reunified). Various other parties are named after "socialist democracy" in Brazil, Ireland, England, Canada, and Turkey.

Socialist-democratic systems preceding the Soviet Union may include the Paris Commune, the Strandzha Commune, the Finnish Socialist Workers' Republic, Makhnovshchina, and the Russian SFSR prior to the Kronstadt Rebellion. Other examples include the Shanghai Commune, Revolutionary Catalonia, the Zapatista territories, and Rojava.

== Views on compatibility of socialism and democracy ==
=== Support ===
One of the major scholars who have argued that socialism and democracy are compatible is the Austrian-born American economist Joseph Schumpeter, who was hostile to socialism. In his book Capitalism, Socialism and Democracy (1942), Schumpeter emphasised that "political democracy was thoroughly compatible with socialism in its fullest sense", although it has been noted that he did not believe that democracy was a good political system and advocated republican values.

In a 1963 address to the All India Congress Committee, Indian Prime Minister Jawaharlal Nehru stated: "Political democracy has no meaning if it does not embrace economic democracy. And economic democracy is nothing but socialism." Political historian Theodore Draper wrote: "I know of no political group which has resisted totalitarianism in all its guises more steadfastly than democratic socialists." Historian and economist Robert Heilbroner argued that "[t]here is, of course, no conflict between such a socialism and freedom as we have described it. Indeed, this conception of socialism is the very epitome of these freedoms", referring to open association of individuals in political and social life; the democratization and humanization of work; and the cultivation of personal talents and creativity.

Bayard Rustin, long-time member of the Socialist Party of America and National Chairman of the Social Democrats, USA, wrote: "For me, socialism has meaning only if it is democratic. Of the many claimants to socialism only one has a valid title—that socialism which views democracy as valuable per se, which stands for democracy unequivocally, and which continually modifies socialist ideas and programs in the light of democratic experience. This is the socialism of the labor, social-democratic, and socialist parties of Western Europe."

Economist and political theorist Kenneth Arrow argued: "We cannot be sure that the principles of democracy and socialism are compatible until we can observe a viable society following both principles. But there is no convincing evidence or reasoning which would argue that a democratic-socialist movement is inherently self-contradictory. Nor need we fear that gradual moves in the direction of increasing government intervention will lead to an irreversible move to 'serfdom.'" Journalist William Pfaff wrote: "It might be argued that socialism ineluctably breeds state bureaucracy, which then imposes its own kinds of restrictions upon individual liberties. This is what the Scandinavians complain about. But Italy's champion bureaucracy owes nothing to socialism. American bureaucracy grows as luxuriantly and behaves as officiously as any other."

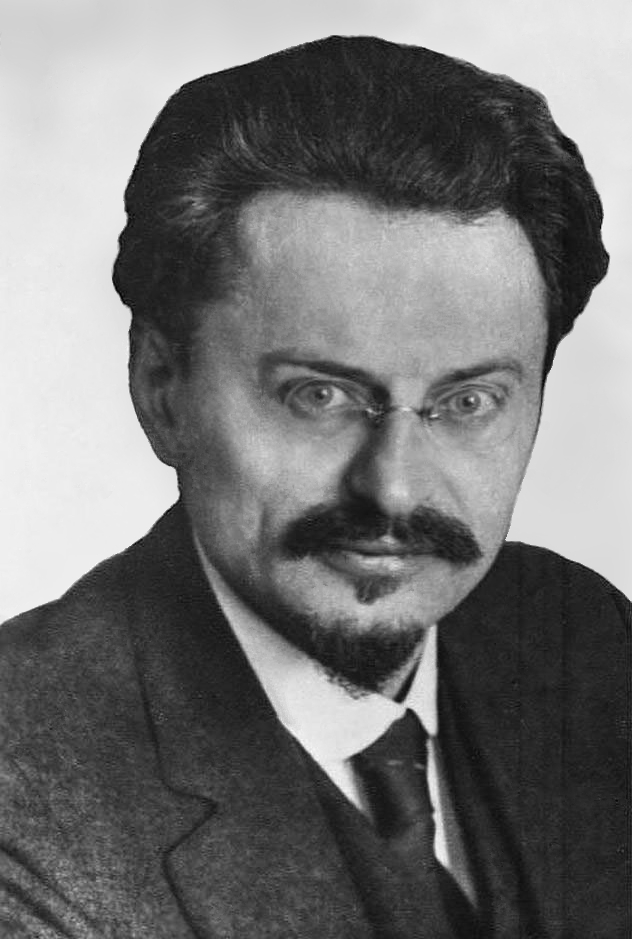
Leon Trotsky was the leader of the Left Opposition which advocated for an alternative set of policies to Stalin.

Marxist theorist Leon Trotsky had proposed the election of a new Soviet presidium with other socialist parties on the basis of proportional representation in 1917. In his work, The Revolution Betrayed: What Is the Soviet Union and Where Is It Going? (1936), Trotsky argued that the excessive authoritarianism under Stalin had undermined the implementation of the First five-year plan. He noted that several engineers and economists who had created the plan were themselves later put on trial as "conscious wreckers who had acted on the instructions of a foreign power".

He would later elaborate on the need for Soviet democracy in relation to the industrialisation period when questioned by the Dewey Commission in 1937:

“The successes are very important, and I affirmed it every time. They are due to the abolition of private property and to the possibilities inherent in planned economy. But, they - I cannot say exactly - but I will say two or three times less than they could be under a regime of Soviet democracy”.

Modern Trotskyists believe that Marxist-Leninist regimes will lead to the establishment of a degenerated or deformed workers' state, where the capitalist elite has been replaced by an unaccountable bureaucratic elite and there is no true democracy or workers' control of industry.

Russian historian Vadim Rogovin attributed the establishment of the one-party Soviet socialist system to the conditions which were “imposed on Bolshevism by hostile political forces”. Rogovin further highlighted the fact that the Bolsheviks made strenuous efforts to preserve the Soviet parties such as the Socialist-Revolutionaries, Mensheviks, and other left parties within the bounds of Soviet legality and their participation in the Soviets on the condition of abandoning armed struggle against the Bolsheviks. Similarly, British historian E.H. Carr drew attention to the fact “the larger section of the party (the SR party) - V.R) had made a coalition with the Bolsheviks, and formally broke from the other section which maintained its bitter feud against the Bolsheviks”.

=== Opposition ===
Some politicians, economists, and theorists have argued that socialism and democracy are incompatible. According to them, history is full of instances of self-declared socialist states that at one point were committed to the values of personal liberty, freedom of speech, freedom of the press, and freedom of association but then found themselves clamping down on such freedoms as they end up being viewed as inconvenient or contrary towards their political or economic goals. Chicago School economist Milton Friedman argued that a "society which is socialist cannot also be democratic" in the sense of "guaranteeing individual freedom". Sociologist Robert Nisbet, a philosophical conservative who began his career as a leftist, argued in 1978 that there is "not a single free socialism to be found anywhere in the world."

Irving Kristol, a neoconservative journalist, argued: "Democratic socialism turns out to be an inherently unstable compound, a contradiction in terms. Every social democratic party, once in power, soon finds itself choosing, at one point after another, between the socialist society it aspires to and the liberal society that lathered it." Kristol added that "socialist movements end up [in] a society where liberty is the property of the state, and is (or is not) doled out to its citizens along with other contingent 'benefits'." Anti-communist academic Richard Pipes argued: "The merger of political and economic power implicit in socialism greatly strengthens the ability of the state and its bureaucracy to control the population. Theoretically, this capacity need not be exercised and need not lead to the growing domination of the population by the state. In practice, such a tendency is virtually inevitable. For one thing, the socialization of the economy must lead to a numerical growth of the bureaucracy required to administer it, and this process cannot fail to augment the power of the state. For another, socialism leads to a tug of war between the state, bent on enforcing its economic monopoly, and the ordinary citizen, equally determined to evade it; the result is repression and the creation of specialized repressive organs."

== See also ==
- Anti-Stalinist Left
- New Democracy
- Nordic Socialism
- People's democracy (Marxism–Leninism)
- List of political parties in the Soviet Union
- Soviet Democracy
- Union Democracy
