= Alexander Tudor-Hart =

British medical doctor

Alexander Ethan Tudor-Hart (born Hart; 3 September 1901 – February 1992) was a British medical doctor in South Wales who was active in the Communist Party of Great Britain. He was the great grandson of American merchant Frederic Tudor and father of Dr. Julian Tudor-Hart.

== Early life and background ==
Alexander was born in Florence, Italy, in 1901, the son of the Canadian artist (Ernest) Percyval Hart and his first wife, Countess Éléonora Délia Julie Aimée Kleczkowska. Alexander had a younger sister Helena Beatrix, born in 1903.

His father Percyval was born in Montreal to Frederick Levey L'Estrange Hart and Eleanora Elizabeth Tudor. Percyval was the grandson of the successful American businessman Frederic Tudor. He and his brother William Owen Tudor-Hart DSO both changed their surname to Tudor-Hart in adulthood (and after Alexander's birth), possibly to strengthen their ties to the Tudor name. Their parents were divorced owing to their father being a "constant and habitual frequenter of houses of ill-fame" in Montreal. Percyval's first wife (Alexander's mother) was his first cousin, as the daughter of his paternal aunt Euphemia "Effie" Tudor-Kleczkowska who had married the Polish-French diplomat Michel Alexandre Cholewa, comte Kleczkowski (Michał Kleczkowski; 1818–1886). Kleczkowski was the only son of Count Joseph Kleczkowski and Julie Sobieska, a direct descendant of John III Sobieski, king of Poland in the 17th century.

The Hart family side was descended from Ephraim Hart, a Bavarian Jew who became a prominent merchant in New York, and was reportedly partners with John Jacob Astor. The family surname was originally Hirz.

== Education and career ==
Tudor-Hart initially studied history and economics under John Maynard Keynes at King's College, Cambridge, graduating with an aegrotat degree in 1924. Later he studied orthopaedics in Vienna under the surgeon Lorenz Böhler. He worked at Booth Hall Children's Hospital, St. Mary Abbott's Hospital, Hampstead General Hospital, and as a general practitioner in Llanelli, Brixton and Colliers Wood.

He was an active member of the Communist Party of Great Britain (CPGB). He represented the South Wales Miners' Federation in a dispute. His home has been described as "a transit camp for anti-fascist refugees from Continental Europe".

During the Spanish Civil War, he volunteered for the Republicans' Medical Aid Committee and was put in charge of the medical unit in December 1936. He was particularly concerned with the management of fractures.

He used his experience in Spain in training other doctors to deal with problems they might expect in wartime. In April 1939 he delivered a lecture to the British Postgraduate Medical School on the Böhler technique for dealing with fractures and open wounds which he had refined in combat situations.

He was a Captain in the Royal Army Medical Corps 1940–45 and served as assistant medical officer at Finsbury Air Raid Precautions. He was denounced as a communist, though the informant admitted that he did excellent surgical work.

In the 1960s he left the CPGB and became chairman of anti-revisionist group, the Working People's Party of England, founded in 1968 by former members of the Committee to Defeat Revisionism, for Communist Unity. In 1972 he split with a section of the membership to form the Committee for a Socialist Programme, which published the "Workers Newsletter" and later renamed itself after its publication, before disbanding in the 1980s.

His first wife was Dr Alison Macbeth. Dr Julian Tudor-Hart was their son. He married the photographer Edith Suschitzky in Vienna in 1933; the couple divorced in 1940.

Tudor-Hart died in February 1992 in Oxford.
