= Red Star (UK) =

- Founded: 2004; 22 years ago
- Ideology: Marxism; Socialism
- Political position: Left-wing
- Colours: Red

Website
- redstarcommando.blogspot.com

Red Star was a revolutionary socialist organisation in Britain formed by former members of the Communist Party of Great Britain (Provisional Central Committee), the Alliance for Workers' Liberty and the Peace Party.

Founded in July 2004 as the Red Party, it produced five issues of its paper called the Red Star.

== History ==
=== Red Platform ===
Politically, the Red Party was a continuation of the Red Platform of the CPGB formed in April 2004 in opposition to the CPGB's electoral support for Respect Party, with the aim to reverse the CPGB's withdrawal from the Socialist Alliance Democracy Platform. It also argued for greater democracy and humanism in the party's internal structure. Though it won the battle to take the CPGB back into the SADP, most of the platform members left following disputes over the publication of their views in the Weekly Worker.

The Red Party regarded the division of the left into separate groups as natural and even a healthy sign that socialists are arguing out complicated questions of programme. It believed the left had "lost its way" through "sectarianism", which it defined as the refusal to unite in a single workers' party unless each group's own programmatic demands are met. It further believed that the left focuses primarily on arguing these programmatic issues internally, rather than taking basic socialist arguments to the working class as a whole. It placed an emphasis on plain language arguments for socialism.

=== Red Party ===
Leninism became the rupture point within the group in the early summer of 2005. The discovery by group members of the writings of Maurice Brinton (pen name of Chris Pallis) and the Solidarity group led to a reassessment of the groups political orientation and the departure of one member to the AWL. The surviving Red Star group considers itself as a part of the libertarian left and has comrades who are active in Class War, the Anarchist Federation and Surrey Anarchist Group whilst maintaining a libertarian Marxist persona and links with parts of the traditional left through the Socialist Alliance.

David Broder, who departed from the Red Party in protest at its lack of Leninist purity, is now a leading figure in The Commune, an anti-Leninist and libertarian Marxist group that derives a great deal of its founding politics from the writings of Maurice Brinton and the Solidarity group.

== Publications ==
- The Red Party Tiny Red Book (July 2004)
- Red Star 1 (August 2004)
- Red Star 2 (October 2004)
- Red Star 3
- Red Star 4
- Red Star 5
