= Working People's Party of England =

Defunct English political party

The Working People's Party of England (WPPE) was a Marxist-Leninist political party in England.

== History ==
Its origins lay in the break-up of the Committee to Defeat Revisionism, for Communist Unity. Of those who had not joined the Action Centre for Marxist-Leninist Unity, a group in Islington founded the "Islington Workers' Committee", which in 1966 joined with a group based in South London to become the "London Workers' Committee". They published monthly the London Workers' Broadsheet. The group was based in Earlsfield, and provided office services to several Black Power and Liberation movements - especially those with sympathies for China. These included: UCPA, Black Panthers, Black Eagles, Frelimo, ZANU, PAC, Portuguese and Palestinian groups. Relationships were mostly friendly with the group based around "The Irish Communist", and the WPS. A loose federation of the LWC with some of these groups took the Campaign against Racial Discrimination" back from the CPGB and its allies in 1967. Another loose "Maoist Black Power Alliance" successfully campaigned against Labour's "In Place of Strife" and called for a boycott of the new GLC elections in Wandsworth where Labour's safe majority vote vanished.The WPPE also organised Bengali self-defence groups in Tower Hamlets. Friendly relationships were established with the Chinese Legation in London and with the Albanian embassy in Paris, and a few members of the WPPE became members of the Afro-Asian Journalists' Association.

In May 1968, the LWC formed the "Working People's Party of England". Fraternal delegates attended from various Liberation movements, including ZANU. The group had five main principles:

- Serving the people
- Uniting all who can be united against the main enemy
- Active members only
- Maximum initiative for members
- All officials subject to immediate recall by members

The party was led by a team with a Chairman Alexander Tudor-Hart, who was a prominent if difficult former-CPGB doctor in Tooting, a Secretary Paul Noone, a prominent member of the small Medical Practitioners Union, based in Islington, who was replaced by a South London power station worker, a Guianan Jonny James as Foreign Relations Secretary with a young Deputy Secretary from South London who managed direct relationships with the Legation and largely edited the foreign news content of the newspaper.

The WPPE split in 1969, when the old leadership disapproved of the (white) wife of one member forming a new relationship with another (Jamaican) member without acrimony. South London, Bristol, Birmingham, Dagenham and Oxford branches left to form the "Serve the People" Group and paper, and took with them the close relationship with the Chinese Legation.

The rump of the WPPE split again in 1972 when a section of membership left with Tudor-Hart to form the Committee for a Socialist Programme. According to Barbaris et al., the English People's Liberation Army may also have originated in the WPPE. In 1975, the party began publishing Workers' Newsletter, and in 1980 it renamed itself the Workers' Newsletter Group. In 1985, it again changed its name, to the Workers' Association (not to be confused with the group linked to the British and Irish Communist Organisation ), but it appears to have disbanded the following year.
