= Campaign for a New Workers' Party =

The Campaign For A New Workers' Party was an initiative of the Socialist Party of England and Wales that argued for the establishment of a new mass workers' party, involving trade union activists, socialists, anti-capitalists, anti-war and environmental activists. It was launched at the party's annual Socialism event in November 2005. There were more than 4,000 signatories to the campaign's founding declaration, many of whom were trade unionists.

Logo of the Campaign for a New Workers' Party.

Like the Socialist Alliance in the early 1990s, the CNWP joined local electoral fronts, such as Save Huddersfield NHS, which had a CNWP supporter and SP member as a councillor. The CNWP supported the Trade Unionist and Socialist Coalition in the 2010 general election.

== Founding ==
The campaign stemmed from the dissolution of the Socialist Alliance in 2004 when Respect - The Unity Coalition was founded. A conference in Liverpool in March 2004 called for a 'Campaign for a Mass Party of the Working Class'. The first formal conference was in London on 19 March 2006, chaired by Dave Nellist, a former Labour MP and current Socialist Party councillor in Coventry. The conference debated nine resolutions about the future shape of the campaign, and elected officers and a steering committee. Policies included a "living minimum wage", full trade union rights and the withdrawal of troops from Iraq. Delegates argued that due to what they saw as previous false starts in trying to establish a party to represent working people—such as Arthur Scargill's Socialist Labour Party—any new party would have to be democratic, open and inclusive, taking a federal approach, to bring in as many supportive organisations and groups as possible, with no one group or individual dominating.

Delegates came from the refounded Socialist Alliance, the Alliance for Workers' Liberty, the Communist Party of Britain, the Socialist Unity Network, the United Socialist Party, and Walsall's Democratic Labour Party. Over 300 of the delegates at the conference were active trade unionists, including members of trade union national executive committees. The campaign allowed trade unions to affiliate to it and over half of the new steering committee were elected by trade union commissions.

== Conferences ==
The second national conference of the campaign took place on 12 May 2007 at the University of London. Speakers included Chris Baugh (Public and Commercial Services Union Assistant Secretary) and Dave Nellist (Socialist Party councillor) as well as a video address from Ricky Tomlinson. The conference discussed and debated the adoption of a charter and some of the issues likely to be central to the campaign.The 2008 conference took place on Sunday 22 June 2008 and was addressed by RMT leader Bob Crow.

== Trade Unionist and Socialist Coalition ==
In 2009, 'No to EU – Yes to Democracy' (NO2EU), the forerunner of the Trade Unionist and Socialist Coalition (TUSC) was founded initially as a result of an electoral alliance between the RMT, the Socialist Party and the Communist Party of Britain, for the purpose of contesting the European elections, and in 2010 TUSC was formed. In the view of the CNWP it was a progenitor of a new workers party, and leading participants in the CNWP such as Dave Nellist became leading participants in TUSC.

== Reception ==
Some left parties claimed that the CNWP was a front for the Socialist Party.

Socialist Alternative's Marxist Left Review listed the CNWP among several failed "broad left" initiatives in the UK, alongside the Scottish Socialist Party, the Socialist Alliance, and Respect: "So we ended up with the different Marxist groups in Britain, each with their own blueprint for the 'new broad party', usually around themselves."

== See also ==
- Convention of the Left
- Labour Representation Committee (2004)
- Socialist Green Unity Coalition
- Welsh Socialist Alliance
