= Bill Bland =

British marxist-Leninist

William B. Bland
- Born: April 28, 1916; Ashton-under-Lyne, Lancashire
- Died: March 13, 2001 (aged 84)
- Education: Manchester Grammar School
- Political party: Communist League of Great Britain

William Bland (28 April 1916 – 13 March 2001) was a British Marxist-Leninist.

== Early life ==
Bland was born in Ashton-under-Lyne, Lancashire, and attended Manchester Grammar School. His father was director of a printing works, but lost his job during the Depression, and Bland had to leave school to find work at 15. After a visit to the Soviet Union in 1937, Bland migrated to New Zealand in 1938–39. He returned to England in 1950.

== Political activism ==
Before becoming a leading figure of the UK anti-revisionist movement, Bland was a member of the Communist Party of New Zealand and the Communist Party of Great Britain. Bland considered Mao Zedong a left-deviationist while still maintaining that Hoxha was a true Marxist-Leninist in the tradition of Karl Marx, Vladimir Lenin and Joseph Stalin. Bland's line on Mao was problematic since Hoxha and Mao were strategic allies at that time. Bland's position was strengthened after the Sino-Albanian split and he formed the Communist League of Great Britain.

Bland was one of the founders of the Albanian Society, and three years after its foundation he became its secretary, a post which he held almost continuously for 30 years until the fall of the communist regime in Albania. He was editor of the journal of the society, Albanian Life. He also wrote an English-Albanian dictionary which included information on Albanian life, culture, politics and history. Together with the American Communist, Jack Shulman, he participated in the Alliance Marxist-Leninist (North America) and supported International Struggle Marxist-Leninist (ISML).

In 1991, he helped found the Stalin Society, however, he was later expelled by a Maoist faction.

== Works ==
Bland was the coauthor of A Tangled Web: A History Of Anglo-American Relations with Albania (1912–1955). Historian Peter Prifti described the book's treatment of the Corfu Channel incident as "a masterful exposition of that tragic incident, and a good indication of the level of scholarship that characterizes the contents of the book. . . this well-researched study by W. Bland and I. Price goes a long way to untangle the web, so that we may gain a clearer perspective on the subject." Aside from theoretical and historical works, Bland wrote a number of plays, directed two films and produced a ballet.
