= Jack Shulman =

American communist activist (1914–1999)

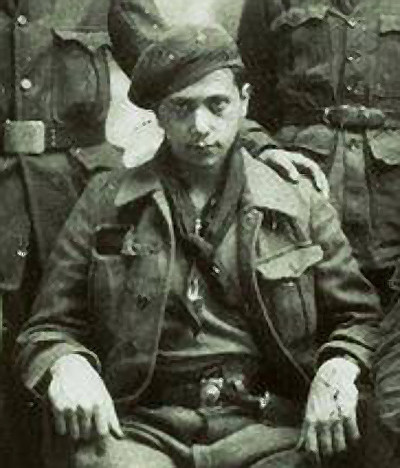
Jack Shulman in Spain, just prior to the Battle of Brunete.

Jacob (Jack) Shulman, (1914–1999), was an American anti-revisionist communist activist and Hoxhaist who fought in the Spanish Civil War and later moved to the People's Republic of China.

== Background ==
Jacob Schulman was born and raised in Rochester, New York, to Jewish parents who had fled the Russian Empire. His father was a housepainter and his mother a washerwoman. Shulman won a scholarship to college but had to leave due to the onset of the Great Depression.

== Career ==
Shulman joined the Young Communist League in 1930 and went on in 1936 to serve with the Lincoln Brigade for 26 months during the Spanish Civil War and in United States Army during World War II. In the early 1950s he worked in the South as part of the Party's organizing efforts with African Americans. He was for several years William Z. Foster's secretary.

Shulman was dissatisfied by the Communist Party USA's turn away from Marxism–Leninism following Nikita Khrushchev's "Secret Speech" in 1956. Following his resignation from the Party, Shulman traveled to Albania and China in pursuit of his political objectives.

Shulman visited Albania then moved to China in 1968 and worked as an editor of English language publications during the Cultural Revolution in Beijing. As China itself began to display outward revisionist tendencies Shulman grew closer to the Party of Labour of Albania. He returned to the United States, published Albania Report and organized the USA-Albania Friendship Association. He had good relationships with the India-Albania Friendship Association and Indian Marxist–Leninists. After the fall of communism in Albania he participated in the Alliance Marxist–Leninist (North America) and supported International Struggle Marxist–Leninist (ISML). He was associated with the British Marxist–Leninist W. B. Bland. In 2008, former political associates of Shulman helped found the American Party of Labor.

== Personal life ==
Shulman married three times. The ashes of his third wife, Ruth, are buried in the Martyr's Hill in Tirana.

Shulman died in 1999.

His son Norman, an American draft dodger who joined him in China during the Vietnam War, stayed behind in China for several years and met and later married Jan Wong, a Canadian student who later became a journalist.
