= Communist League (UK, 1991) =

- Founded: 1991
- Dissolved: 2005
- Split from: Marxist Party
- Succeeded by: A World to Win
- Newspaper: Socialist Future Review
- Ideology: Trotskyism (until 2005)

Website
- http://www.socialistfuture.org.uk/

The Communist League was a small Trotskyist organisation in Britain. Better known as Movement for a Socialist Future, it split from the Marxist Party in 1990, claiming to hold more closely to the ideas of Gerry Healy, who had died the previous year. In 1994, it published a strongly positive biography of Healy, with a foreword by Ken Livingstone. The same year, it founded a small international organisation, which it declared the Fifth International of Communists. It produced the magazine Socialist Future Review.

The group decided to orient itself towards the anti-capitalist movement and published a book entitled A World to Win. In June 2005, it dissolved itself into a group calling itself A World to Win.

== See also ==
- Movement for Socialism (Britain)
- Communist League of Great Britain
- Communist League (UK, 1988)
