= Communist League of Great Britain =

- Split from: Communist Party of Great Britain
- Merged into: Stalin Society
- Ideology: Communism; Anti-revisionism; Marxism–Leninism; Stalinism; Hoxhaism
- Political position: Far-left

Website
- http://www.oneparty.co.uk/compass/

The Communist League of Great Britain was an anti-revisionist group in the United Kingdom.

It origins were in the Communist Party of Great Britain, where a faction formed around Bill Bland. Initially Maoist, it joined the majority of the Committee to Defeat Revisionism, for Communist Unity in 1965 to form the Action Centre for Marxist-Leninist Unity, publishing Hammer or Anvil. In 1967, this was renamed the Marxist–Leninist Organisation of Britain. Soon after, the group ceased supporting Mao, instead supporting Hoxhaism - although Enver Hoxha was aligned with Mao at the time. Following a split the MLOB was renamed the Communist League in 1975, its ideological position strengthened with the Sino-Albanian split.

The group remained active into the new millennium, but became less so since Bland's death in 2001, and their website contains no new content since that year. The Communist Party Alliance, a successor group working within the Stalin Society, had their own site which was active until 2009.

== See also ==
- Revolutionary Communist League of Britain
- Communist League (UK, 1988)
- Communist League (UK, 1990)
- List of anti-revisionist groups

== Bibliography ==
- Peter Barberis, John McHugh and Mike Tyldesley, Encyclopedia of British and Irish Political Organizations
