= Len Doherty =

British journalist and writer

Len Doherty (1930–1983) was a British miner, journalist and writer. He has been named as "among the most important practitioners of the socialist novel in Britain."

Born in Maryhill, Glasgow in 1930, Doherty moved with his family to Yorkshire, England in the 1940s and started work as a miner at the age of 17. In the mid-1950s while working at Thurcroft Colliery near Rotherham he became active in the local Communist Party and was one of a number of working class writers of the period sponsored by the Party and published by in-house company Lawrence and Wishart. His 1955 debut novel A Miner's Sons was the most successful of its type.

Second novel The Man Beneath appeared in 1957; Doherty left the Party the same year and began work as a journalist for the Sheffield Star, later becoming chief leader writer. Third and final completed novel The Good Lion was published in 1958 and praised in The Spectator.

Doherty was the model for the character of 'Davie' in Clancy Sigal's semi-autobiographical 1960 novel Weekend in Dinlock, the pair becoming friends after having been introduced by Doris Lessing. His writing was also an influence on Stan Barstow. According to Sid Chaplin, Doherty was part of a "Northern writers' mafia" brought together by media coverage of kitchen sink/angry young men literature of the period, including Chaplin, Barstow, John Braine and Keith Waterhouse.

Doherty was named Provincial Journalist of the Year in 1969, which led to foreign assignments. In February 1970, he was one of several passengers injured in a terrorist attack by the PDFLP at Munich airport while on a return El Al flight from a trip to Israel, which affected his career and health.

Len Doherty committed suicide in 1983.

The Good Lion was republished in 2023.

== Novels ==
- A Miner's Sons (Lawrence & Wishart, 1955)
- The Man Beneath (Lawrence & Wishart, 1957)
- The Good Lion (MacGibbon & Kee, 1958; 1889 Books, 2023)
