= Reg Birch =

British trade unionist (1914–1994)

- Born: 7 June 1914
- Died: 2 June 1994 (aged 79)
- Political party: Communist Party of Britain (Marxist–Leninist)

Reginald Birch (7 June 1914 – 2 June 1994) was a British communist and trade unionist, aligning with Maoism later in his career.

== Early trade union and political work ==
Born in Kilburn, London, Birch became a toolmaker and joined the Amalgamated Engineering Union (AEU). He became active in the union and also in supporting the Republican government of Spain against the fascist invasion and coup (see Spanish Civil War). He joined the Communist Party of Great Britain (CPGB) in 1939.

In his early days, Birch was a protégé of the communist engineering workers’ leader Wal Hannington. In May 1941, Birch led an aggressive strike at Swift Scale at Park Royal in west London. The workers dubbed the stoppage a ‘holiday’, hoping to mute the effect of the illegality of strike action under Order 1305 in wartime. According to historian Nina Fishman, this audacious strike ‘became a set-piece political battle aimed at discrediting the bona fides of the state and the whole employing class in the war effort.’ Seven shop stewards were arraigned in court for leading this strike, but when the case was finally heard, one week after Germany’s surprise invasion of the USSR, they were merely bound over to keep the peace.

Afterwards, Birch worked at Landis & Gyr, also at Park Royal. He built the trade union membership up to 90% of the workforce. In May 1944, he was sacked on a charge of playing darts in the toolroom in his tea break. There was a demonstration of 2,000 workers outside the factory, and protests and demonstrations inside the factory. The words ‘We want Birch’ were painted up all around the factory, with the same slogan chanted en masse for three minutes on the hour, every hour; while every half hour, there was a demonstration of hammering metal on metal. This was a time when the Communist party did not support strikes.

In this period, Birch also worked at Molins, Roller Print, Rafton Tools, and Hoover. After the war, he was AEU Convenor at de Haviland’s Stag Lane factory at Edgware, north London, from 1946 until 1960. He was elected to the National Committee, the union's annual conference, every year from 1943 onward.

In 1956, Birch was elected to the executive committee of the CPGB. Journalist Peter Paterson observed: "When I asked him how he could possibly have sided with the 'tankies', so called because of the use of Russian tanks to quell the revolt, he said 'they wanted a trade unionist who could stomach Hungary, and I fitted the bill'."

In 1960, Birch was elected as a full-time AEU Divisional Organiser. In 1966, he was elected to the Executive Council to represent London and the South East - on the first ballot, and with three times as many votes as his main right wing opponent Jack Whyman. Birch held this position until his retirement in 1979. The AEU became the Amalgamated Union of Engineering and Foundry Workers (AEF) in 1968, and the Amalgamated Union of Engineering Workers in 1970.

== Standing for AEU President ==
Birch ran four times for President of the AEU:

In the election of 1956 to replace Robert Openshaw, who was retiring, Birch led William Carron in the first ballot, by 20,594 to 19,604, out of 84,811 votes cast, but lost to Carron by 83,847 to 35,400 in the second ballot.

Standing for re-election in 1959, Carron beat Birch in the first ballot outright, by 57,127 to 19,779, out of 119,247 votes cast.

The 1964 election was closer. In the first ballot, Carron led Birch by 44,529 to 31,213 out of 95,349 votes cast; defeating him in the second ballot by 60,256 to 42,051; when Birch had 41% of the vote.

Prior to the 1967 election, the Communist Party's national advisory had decided by 24 votes to 16 to support Hugh Scanlon instead of Birch. Birch was expelled from the Communist Party on 27 April 1967 for his membership of the editorial committee of the anti-revisionist journal The Marxist In the election for AEU President, Birch ran third in the first ballot with 11,428 votes (11%), behind Scanlon and John Boyd (trade unionist) on 35,767 and 35,348 respectively. Scanlon won on the second ballot.

== Communist Party of Britain (Marxist–Leninist) ==
At odds with those perceived as revisionists within the CPGB, Birch left the party in 1967. With comrades from the AEU and others, he formed the Communist Party of Britain (Marxist–Leninist) (CPB (M-L)) in 1968. Birch continued to help to organise various strikes, including the 1971 Ford strike.

The industrial correspondent Herman Roberts described Birch’s attitudes on the AEU’s EC after his departure from the Communist Party: Mr Birch ‘now free from established party ties, has emerged as a purely objective trade unionist’... and Birch ‘does not consistently ally himself with the militant left.’

He met Mao Zedong, Zhou Enlai and Enver Hoxha on visits to China and Albania. In 1975, he was elected to the general council of the Trades Union Congress. In 1977, he became a member of the Energy Commission. He retired from his full-time trade union work in 1979, but remained chairman of the CPB (M-L) until 1985.
