= Europinion =

Online opinion publication based in London

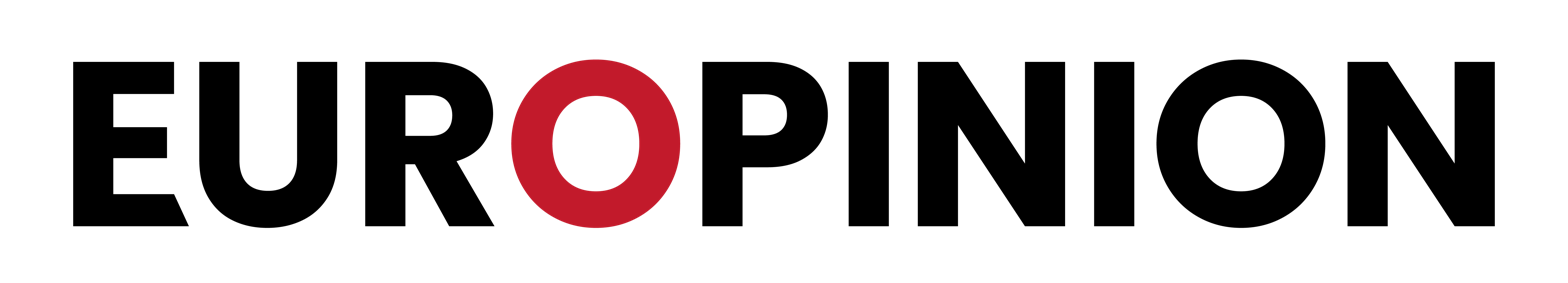
- Type: Daily
- Format: Online
- Founder: Will Kingston-Cox
- Editor-in-chief: Salome von Stolzmann
- Head of Design: Will Allen
- Founded: 2023
- Headquarters: London, England
- Website: https://europinion.uk

Europinion is an online daily opinion publication and social enterprise based in London, England. Founded in 2023, it publishes opinion journalism, podcasts and research on European and international affairs. Europinion also runs civic campaigns and youth engagement projects, focused on media literacy and disinformation resilience.

== Structure ==
Europinion's leadership includes Will Kingston-Cox as managing director and Salome von Stolzmann as Editor-in-Chief. Former Editors-in-Chief include Maxime Zigrand (2024-2026) and Cyrus Larcombe-Moore (2023-2024). The editorial approach emphasises commentary, opinion journalism, and youth contributions. Contributors have included students and young professionals from institutions such as the University of Oxford and University College London.

The Europinion Institute for Research (EIR) functions as a research arm. It has been recognised in academic contexts, for instance through an external peer-review role listed at the University of St Andrews.

== Activities ==
=== Commentary ===
Europinion publishes regular opinion pieces and commentary on UK, European, and international politics, economics, and foreign affairs. Its editorial focus is on interpretive articles and cross-spectrum debate, referred to by external outlets as an "independent European affairs newspaper" in the context of civic campaign. Commentators include former Croatian Justice Minister Vesna Škare-Ožbolt and Elle Farrell-Kingsley.

=== Media Literacy and Civic Engagement ===
Europinion has collaborated with student-led groups to deliver educational tools aimed at combatting disinformation. Europinion appeared before the European Parliament's Committee on Culture and Education in April 2025 during hearings on disinformation and civic resilience to present its media literacy toolkit proposals to safeguard young Europeans. In May 2025, Europinion published its peer-reviewed policy report 'Navigating the Information Disorder: European Youth in the Age of Disinformation'.

In June 2025, University of Oxford students partnered with the platform to present a "media literacy toolkit" adapted from the policy report to the European Parliament Special Committee for the European Democracy Shield, during its fact-finding mission to London.

Europinion has also participated in wider social campaigns. In 2025, Chartist magazine reported on a campaign against gender-based violence organised by the Young European Movement in partnership with the European Parliament and Europinion.
