= Communist League (UK, 1988) =

- Leader: Collective leadership (Central Committee)
- Founded: 1988
- Split from: Socialist Action
- Headquarters: London
- Ideology: Communism; Trotskyism; Euroscepticism; Castroism; Zionism
- Political position: Far-left
- International affiliation: Pathfinder tendency

The Communist League is a British political party that was formed by a group of members expelled in 1988 from Socialist Action. Those members had joined the U.S. Socialist Workers Party's Pathfinder tendency. It maintained a bookshop in London, originally in The Cut, then Bethnal Green Road. It now operates a web/mail order service from Seven Sisters for Pathfinder publications. The League's members distribute The Militant, the paper of the U.S. Socialist Workers Party. In 2007, an article in The Militant claimed that the group had members who work in the meat-packing industry.

== Electoral history ==
The League contested two seats in the 1992 UK General Election.

Two Communist League candidates stood in the 2005 UK general election; one ran in Bethnal Green and Bow polling 38 votes, the seat which was gained by George Galloway for the Respect Party. In the 2008 London Assembly election, Julie Crawford stood in the City and East constituency and polled 701 votes, 0.3% of the popular vote, coming 12th and last among the candidates. In the 2010 UK general election, the Communist League stood Caroline Bellamy in Edinburgh South West (48 votes) and Paul Davies in Hackney South and Shoreditch (110 votes). Peter Clifford stood in Manchester Central in 2012, gaining 64 votes. In the 2012 London Assembly election, Paul Davies stood in the City and East constituency and increased the vote to 1,108 (0.6) coming last out of eight candidates.

For the 2015 UK general election, the Communist League stood two parliamentary candidates (in London and Manchester) and two other candidates for Manchester City Council. Peter Clifford withdrew his candidacy in the Greater Manchester mayoral election, due to take place 4 May 2017, citing the cost of the deposit. He stood instead in the 2017 UK general election for the constituency of Manchester Gorton, gaining 27 votes, equating to approximately 0.1% of the vote. Andrés Mendoza also stood as a Communist League candidate in the Islington North constituency for the 2017 election, receiving 7 votes.

In the 2019 UK general election, Caroline Bellamy stood in the Manchester constituency of Wythenshawe & Sale East, winning 58 votes The Communist League announced in February 2021 that it was standing Pamela Holmes as a candidate in the 2021 London Assembly election, Peter Clifford in the 2021 Greater Manchester mayoral election and Andrés Mendoza in the 2021 London mayoral election; however, Mendoza was not included in the final list of mayoral candidates, suggesting the Communist League had withdrawn from the 2021 London Mayoral race. Similarly, Cifford was not included in the list of candidates declared for the Greater Manchester mayoral election by the time nominations had closed. In the 2024 general election the party stood Peter Clifford in Manchester Rusholme and Pamela Holmes Tottenham, winning 167 and 63 votes in each.

In February 2026, trade unionist Hugo Wils stood as the Communist League's candidate in the 2026 Gorton and Denton by-election. The election was won by Hannah Spencer of the Green Party, and Wils received 29 votes, the least out of any candidate.

In October 2026, union organiser Jonathan Silberman stood as the party's candidate in the 2026 Holborn and St Pancras by-election, for the seat vacated by the resignation in June of former Prime Minister Keir Starmer. Silberman received 9 votes, and the election was won by Sagal Abdi-Wali of the Labour Party.

== See also ==
- Communist League of Great Britain
- Communist League (UK, 1990)
