= Workers' Power =

Workers Power is the name of several political parties or organizations:

- Workers' Power (Germany) (Arbeitermacht)
- Workers Power (Ireland)
- Workers' Power (Italy), a radical left-wing political group (1976-1983)
- Workers' Power (Sweden)
- Workers' Power (UK)
- Workers Power (United States)
