= Socialist Democracy Group =

The Socialist Democracy Group was a Trotskyist group which existed in England between 1998 and 2002. It organised former supporters of the Militant tendency and Socialist Outlook who supported the Scottish Socialist Party.

In 2002, it merged into the Socialist Solidarity Network. Its former members are now supporters of Socialist Resistance.
