= Revolutionary Communist League of Britain =

Former Political Party

The Revolutionary Communist League of Britain was a Maoist political party in Great Britain, formed in 1977.

== History ==
The origins of the RCLB lie in the Joint Committee of Communists, founded in 1968 by former Communist Party of Great Britain members and from various youth organisations. In 1969, the group renamed itself the Communist Federation of Britain (Marxist-Leninist), and soon became the main rival of the Communist Party of Britain (Marxist-Leninist). In 1977, the 9-member Communist Unity Association (Marxist-Leninist) merged with the group, which renamed itself the Revolutionary Communist League, and in 1980, the Communist Workers' Movement and Birmingham Communist Association also joined.

Like many Maoist organisations, the RCL was regularly convulsed by internal disputes and splits. In 1979 the organisation's secretary and some others (the so-called 'Anti-League Faction') were expelled due after they opposed the majority line that Soviet social-imperialism rather than Britain was the main enemy; two of the expelled formed the Stockport Communist Group. Later, the organisation's first chairman was expelled.

As part of their support for China and against the Soviet bloc (which included Vietnam) in the Sino-Soviet split, the RCLB distinguished themselves on the far left by consistent proclaimed solidarity with the Khmer Rouge-controlled territory of Democratic Kampuchea during the Cambodian–Vietnamese War.

The RCL welcomed the arrest of the Gang of Four in China in 1976 and also the subsequent policies of Deng Xiaoping. But during the 1980s, the RCL developed criticisms of the Chinese Communist Party, opposing its violent suppression of the Tiananmen Square protests of 1989, and in 1992 adopted a new political platform closer to the original views of Mao. It dissolved in 1998.

The RCL published the paper Class Struggle from 1973 until around 1990, the journal 'Revolution' from 1976 to 1980 and the journal October.
