= Emancipation and Liberation =

- Type: Four-monthly journal
- Format: magazine
- Owner: Independently owned
- Editor: Collective editorial responsibilities
- Founded: 2002
- Headquarters: Dundee
- Website: E&L website

Emancipation and Liberation is a journal produced by the Republican Communist Network, a former platform of the Scottish Socialist Party. It was established in Spring 2002.

Since its establishment, the journal has hosted a number of debates within the left. The longest running has been the debate in response to Neil Davidson's Discovering the Scottish Revolution 1692–1746. Starting in Issue 5, Autumn 2003 with Allan Armstrong's Broadswords and Bayonets. Challenging left nationalist and left unionism in the SSP the debate continued through to Issue 10, Summer 2005 with Caught Between the Covenant and the Clans.

== Other information ==
Emancipation and Liberation is part of the Republic Of Letters.
