= Left Fraction =

The Left Fraction, sometimes calling itself the Left Fraction, British Section of the Fourth International (In Opposition), was a Trotskyist organisation in the United Kingdom.

The group formed as a tendency of the Revolutionary Socialist League (RSL) in 1940. It was described by other tendencies in the disintegrating organisation as pacifist. The group opposed Trotsky's Proletarian Military Policy, and was expelled in 1943. On the first day of conference held by the Fourth International in 1944, the Left Fraction and also the Trotskyist Opposition were reunited with the RSL. Despite the objections of the Left Fraction, the second day saw the reformed RSL unified with the rival Workers International League – on the WIL's terms – to form the new Revolutionary Communist Party (RCP).

The Left Fraction initially remained within the RCP, but refused to accept the authority of its leadership. They published their own newspaper, the Militant Miner, aimed at coalminers, and determined instead to pursue a policy of entryism within the Labour Party. As a result, they were expelled in 1945.

Outside the RCP, the Left Fraction began publishing a general entryist newspaper, the Voice of Labour. The Labour Party opposed this, and expelled two Fraction members, Tom Mercer and Harry Selby, for contributing to it. This led to a split within the organisation over tactics, with the group's leadership deciding to join the newly formed Socialist Fellowship. They dissolved the organisation in 1948.

A majority of the organisation opposed the group's dissolution, but only a small rump based in Glasgow actually continued under the Left Fraction name. Some members left to join a new Revolutionary Socialist League in 1956. After a failed attempt to work with the International Group, the remainder determined to continue alone, publishing the journal Politics.

In 1966, the Left Fraction - by now possibly consisting solely of Selby - discussed a joint publication with the tiny Socialist Current organisation, but this was not pursued.

The Left Fraction finally ceased operations in 1967. Harry Selby later became a Labour Member of Parliament.
