= Straight Left =

British media publication

Straight Left was a left-wing newspaper published from 1979. The phrase was also the generic name given to a political faction of the Communist Party of Great Britain who disagreed with the leadership's emerging Eurocommunist politics, and were responsible for the production of the newspaper. The origins of this faction within the CPGB go back earlier, but it emerged under this name in 1977.

== Organisation and ideology ==
The leading ideological force in the Straight Left faction was Fergus Nicholson, who had previously worked as the CPGB's student organiser. According to Michael Mosbacher in Standpoint magazine, the faction was "a hard-line anti-reformist pro-Soviet faction within the Communist Party". Unlike the leadership, they supported the Soviet invasion of Czechoslovakia in 1968 and Afghanistan in 1979. They also thought the party should concentrate its work in Trade Unions, and not in social movements such as feminism and environmentalism.

Because the CPGB's rules banned the formation of factional groups, SL operated in secret. Members of the faction contributed funds to the organisation through significant monthly donations, which helped fund the groups educational gatherings, often referred to as camping weekends. Its meetings were not publicly announced, and writers in their newspaper Straight Left and their theoretical magazine Communist wrote under pseudonyms like Nicholson, whose pen name was "Harry Steel". The Straight Left faction also produced anonymous bulletins to try to influence CPGB Congresses, usually under the heading "Congress Truth".

The faction produced a dissident internal pamphlet entitled "The Crisis in Our Communist Party - Cause, Effect and Cure", which was distributed nationally but not under its name. This was authored (in all likelihood in conjunction with others), by veteran miner and communist Charlie Woods, who was expelled from the CPGB for putting his name to the publication.

Charlie Woods, who had been the CPGB's Northern organiser in the late 1930s, was the faction's oldest link to a period when the CPGB was operating in a manner to which the Straight Left faction hoped the CPGB would eventually return. A significant number of Straight Left faction members had developed close personal friendships with members of fraternal communist parties, particularly the Iranian, Iraqi, South African and Greek parties, who were well organised on most British University campuses.

Many Straight Left supporters felt that the style of organisation and the overall ethos of these organisations was significantly more impressive than the CPGB at that stage, and as a result sought to steer the CPGB. They wished the CPGB to return to a more pro-Soviet stance, with high levels of membership commitment, a focus on working-class organisation, as well as a strong emphasis on Marxist–Leninist education in the branches. The faction recruited members from within the CPGB and required members to demonstrate a high level of commitment. The faction was critical of those who were increasingly focusing not on traditional class politics but on the new social forces around the environment and feminism. The faction's opposition to the leadership of the CPGB was visceral and extremely time-consuming for its members, and many faction members were expelled throughout this period.

== Newspaper ==
In March 1979 the Straight Left newspaper was launched as a political monthly that claimed to be a "non-party, non sectarian journal of the left, committed to working class unity and class consciousness". It was edited by Mike Toumazou and the business manager was Seumas Milne. Though it was a faction within the CPGB it had supporters within the Labour Party. The editorial advisory panel consisted of Ray Buckton, Bill Keys, James Lamond MP, Jim Layzell, Alfred Lomas MEP, Joan Maynard MP, Alan Sapper, Gordon Schaffer and William Wilson MP. Frank Swift was responsible for fund-raising. In effect, it copied the tactics of the Labour Party entryist tactics of Militant tendency with the pretence that its members were merely readers of the Militant newspaper,

Straight Left supporters chose to stay in the CPGB when rival factions split off to form the New Communist Party (NCP), in 1977, and the Communist Party of Britain (CPB), in 1988. Some leading members, such as Andrew Murray and Nick Wright, formed a group called "Communist Liaison"; after the dissolution of the CPGB in 1991 they published a newsletter called "Diamat" but it later dissolved and most of them, including Wright and Murray, joined the Communist Party of Britain (CPB), soon taking up leading positions throughout the new organisation. Others, notably Fergus Nicholson, decided not to join any party; whether through a continued distaste at having to work with once reviled rivals, or a belief that the conditions were no longer suitable to the creation of a Communist party in Britain is not clear, but they stayed resolutely outside the CPB. Many former leading figures in the faction who did not join the CPB ceased political activity, whilst others remained active in broader movements.

== Aftermath and The Socialist Correspondent ==
The Straight Left newspaper/magazine, published by Nicholson and his most loyal supporters, continued to appear long after the bulk of the original faction had decided to follow Andrew Murray and Nick Wright into the Communist Party of Britain. After a series of annual conferences, Straight Left eventually ceased publication as a newspaper, due to the difficulties in maintaining sales and production. The main publication of the group is now The Socialist Correspondent, which is available online. Other leading members of the group were Steve Howell, Peter Latham and Peter Hall.

Howell, subsequently a lobbyist, later re-emerged as Deputy Communications director under Seumas Milne during Jeremy Corbyn's leadership of the Labour Party.

== See also ==
- Tankie
