= Socialist Outlook =

Socialist Outlook was the name of two publications edited by supporters of the Fourth International in Britain.

== Socialist Outlook (1948–1954) ==
The first Socialist Outlook was the name of the newspaper published by the Socialist Fellowship from December 1948 until 1954. For much of that period, it was edited by John Lawrence and was formally published by an association of left wing members of the Labour Party. The paper's editorial policy was controlled by a group around Gerry Healy. This Trotskyist group was privately known as The Club. Socialist Outlook was banned by the Labour Party's National Executive Committee in late 1954 and soon expired. The Club moved to selling Tribune instead.

== Socialist Outlook (1987–2009) ==
The second Socialist Outlook was the publication of the International Socialist Group, the Trotskyist organisation which was the British section of the Fourth International between 1987 and 2009. Launched as a bi-monthly magazine in May 1987, the title Socialist Outlook was partly selected because, at that time, most of the ISG's members were also active in the Labour Party. It was published as a fortnightly newspaper between 1992 and 2002. It was then a quarterly magazine and used the ISSN 0951-8657.

'Socialist Outlook' was used as the electoral name of the International Socialist Group when it stood four candidates as part of the Socialist Alliance in the 2001 general election. The candidates ran in Lambeth and Southwark, Bristol, North Tyneside and Oxford East.
