= Communist Party of Britain (Marxist–Leninist) =

Political party in the United Kingdom

- Abbreviation: CPB-ML
- Founder: Reg Birch
- Founded: 1968; 58 years ago
- Split from: Communist Party of Great Britain
- Headquarters: Tottenham, London, England
- Newspaper: Workers
- Ideology: Communism; Marxism–Leninism; Anti-revisionism; Hard Euroscepticism; Anti-immigration; Maoism (Historically); Hoxhaism
- Political position: Far-left
- Colours: Red

Website
- cpbml.org.uk

Typical front cover of The Worker from the 1970s

The Communist Party of Britain (Marxist–Leninist), often abbreviated as CPB-ML, is a British Marxist–Leninist political party. It originated in 1968 as an anti-revisionist split from the Communist Party of Great Britain and was chaired by Reg Birch until 1985. The official programme of the party since 1972 has been The British Working Class and its Party. The publication of the CPB-ML was originally known as The Worker, but is today called Workers.

== History ==
The party was formed in 1968 by Reg Birch as a Maoist split from the Communist Party of Great Britain, siding with the Communist Party of China in the Sino-Soviet split. Birch, whom was expelled from the CPGB in January 1967, visited China in August of the same year which led to the founding of the party in April 1968.

From 1979 onwards the CPB-ML sided with Enver Hoxha in the Sino-Albanian split.

A small number of members split from the party in 1975, forming the Nottingham Communist Group. In 1976, three branches of the CPB-ML split and formed the Communist Workers Movement, initially under the leadership of Ian Williams. This group later joined the Revolutionary Communist League of Britain.

In the 1980s, the CPB-ML came to support the Soviet Union again for a period, before dropping this line over Mikhail Gorbachev's reforms. More recently, the CPB-ML has developed a national line for Britain: "Rebuild Britain"; the party is strongly opposed to the European Union.

The party published The Worker from 1969 until 2000, when it became Workers.

Party members focus on work in the labour movement.

== Notable members ==
Notable early members of the CPB-ML included writer William Ash, journalists and academics Roy Greenslade and Steve Hewlett, engineer and trade union activist Mike Cooley, journalist and speechwriter Ian Williams and comedian and author Alexei Sayle.

== Positions ==
=== EU and Brexit ===
During the British EU referendum of 2016, a number of parties on the far-left supported "Lexit" (arguing for Brexit, Britain leaving the European Union, from a left-perspective). The Communist Party of Britain (Marxist–Leninist) was one such party. They opted not to join the No2EU — Yes to Democracy campaign (dominated by the Communist Party of Britain and Trotskyist Socialist Party), but instead backed the Grassroots Out campaign. This was supported by a broad array of British political figures, from Nigel Farage of UKIP to Kate Hoey of Labour and George Galloway of the Respect Party.

Following the referendum, on 29 March 2017 the Prime Minister Theresa May invoked Article 50. The Communist Party of Britain (Marxist–Leninist) promptly issued a statement which described those who opposed the triggering of Article 50 after the British people voted in favour of Brexit as "enemies of the people". The statement also called for "taking control" of "our economy, our laws, our borders".

=== Immigration ===
The party is notable for its opposition to unskilled and low-skilled immigration. In a statement from 2005 in their publication Workers, the party stated that it regards the recent mass immigration from Eastern Europe into Britain as a deliberate plan by the capitalist ruling class to use "cheap labour" to "undermine the wages and conditions of British workers." It also stressed concerns in the same article that this recent mass immigration was having the effect of impacting national infrastructure; schools, hospitals and transport; by overloading them, to the detriment of the indigenous working-class.

=== NATO ===
The party calls for the UK's withdrawal from NATO.

== See also ==
- Committee to Defeat Revisionism, for Communist Unity — an earlier CPGB Maoist splinter group.
- List of anti-revisionist groups
