= Committee to Defeat Revisionism, for Communist Unity =

British Marxist–Leninist group

Committee to Defeat Revisionism, for Communist Unity was a small British Marxist–Leninist group that left the Communist Party of Great Britain in 1963 and existed until c. 1970. CDRCU was led by Michael McCreery, the son of General Sir Richard McCreery. CDRCU was sympathetic towards the Chinese Communist Party and the Party of Labour of Albania, with CDRCU members attending May Day celebrations in Tirana in May 1964. The group began publishing Vanguard in 1963.

== History ==
CDRCU reached the height of its activity from February 1964 to February 1965, during which CDRCU cells were established in London, the Thames Valley, Scotland, West Yorkshire, Manchester and Cardiff, and public meetings were arranged. CDRCU had split with other CPGB members, some of them based around the Forum publication, who wanted to remain inside the CPGB to conduct the anti-revisionist struggle. In October 1964, the CDRCU stood a candidate in Huyton in the general election, gaining 899 votes.

After McCreery died (at the age of only 36) from cancer in 1965 in New Zealand, the activity of the group declined sharply. Most of the members of CDRCU regrouped into the Action Centre for Marxist-Leninist Unity, which evolved into the Marxist-Leninist Organisation of Britain. A small number formed the Finsbury Communist Association. Others later formed the Workers' Party of Scotland and the London Workers' Committee. In 1966 the London Workers' Committee split, becoming the Working People's Party of England.

Some of the Irish members of the CDRCU later joined the Irish Communist Group in 1965. When the latter organisation split, they went on to form the Irish Communist Organisation. Noel Jenkinson, a Protestant from County Meath, was another Ireland-born member of CDRCU who had joined from the Communist Party of Great Britain. He later joined the Official IRA and was convicted for carrying out the 1972 Aldershot bombing.

Vanguard continued publication until 1972.

== See also ==
- Communist Party of Britain (Marxist–Leninist) — another CPGB splinter
- Revolutionary Marxist–Leninist League
- List of anti-revisionist groups
