= Socialist Democracy (Brazil) =

Socialist Democracy (Portuguese: Democracia Socialista, DS) is a far-left Trotskyist group in Brazil. Formed in 1979, DS was affiliated to the United Secretariat of the Fourth International. DS was one of the first groups to affiliate with the Workers' Party (PT) when the PT formed in 1980. The activists in Socialist Democracy hoped to transform the PT into a revolutionary socialist party. As the PT grew, DS grew to become one of the largest Trotskyist organizations in the world.

DS has been most prominent in the municipal government of Porto Alegre, where DS member Raul Pont was vice-mayor from 1992 to 1996 and mayor from 1996 to 2000, and the state government of Rio Grande do Sul. DS members played a significant role in the elaboration of the Participatory Budget (though they had initially opposed its introduction) and also in the arrangements for the three World Social Forums held in Porto Alegre.

In recent years, the PT has become more moderate, especially after party leader Luiz Inácio Lula da Silva became President of Brazil in 2003. This caused tension in the entire left wing of the PT, including in Socialist Democracy. In 2004, Heloísa Helena (a member of DS and a Brazilian Senator) and other dissident PT members were expelled from the party, and they formed the Socialism and Liberty Party (P-SOL). Part of the DS tendency remained in the PT, but another part left to join the P-SOL. Those who entered PSOL formed a tendency called Enlace. The DS majority remaining in the PT has come to be the core of attempts to unseat the PT's current leadership, with DS member Raul Pont narrowly losing with 48% of the votes in a 2005 election for the presidency of the PT.

Brisa Bracchi, leader of the opposition on the Municipal Chamber of Natal, has identified with DS.
