= Communist Party of Great Britain (Provisional Central Committee) =

Communist Party of Great Britain (Provisional Central Committee) Communist Party of Great Britain
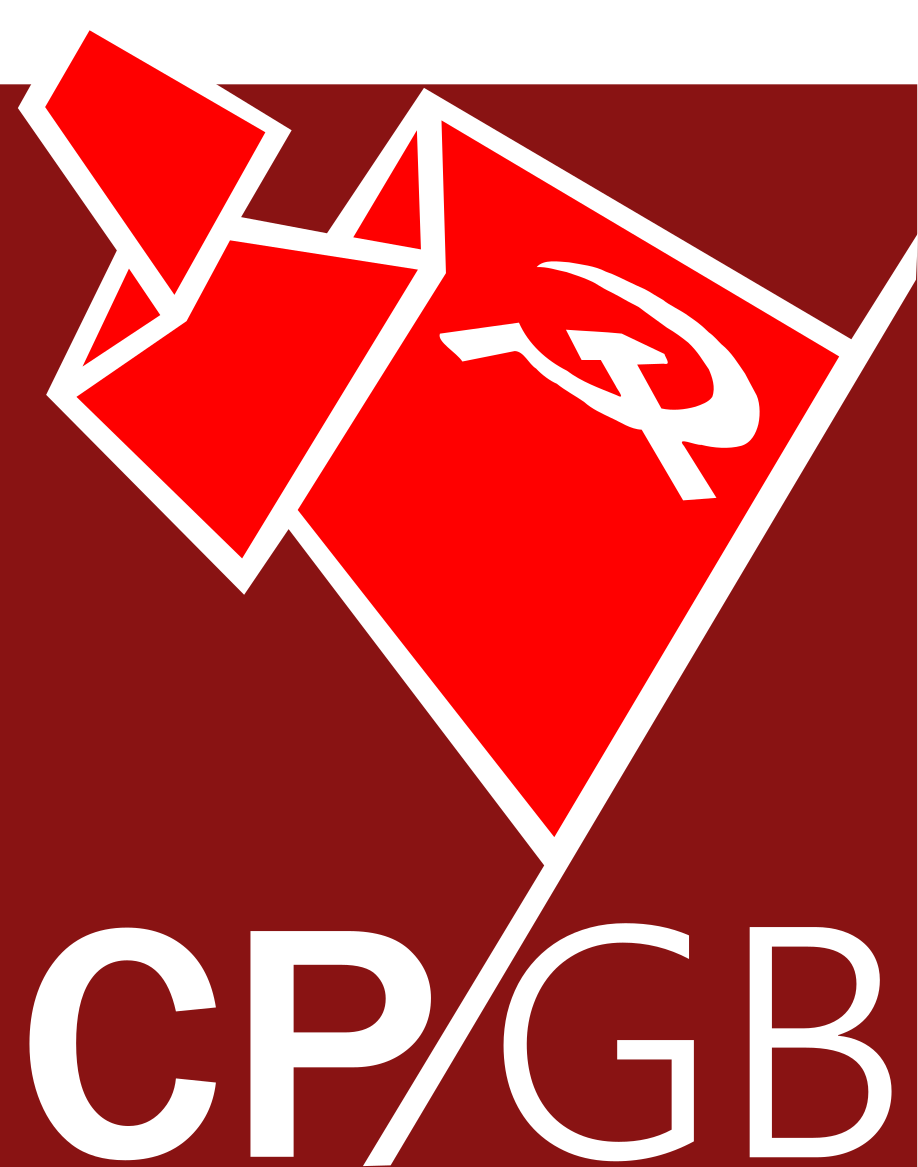
- Abbreviation: CPGB (PCC)
- Founded: 1989
- Split from: Communist Party of Great Britain
- Headquarters: London, England
- Newspaper: Weekly Worker
- Ideology: Communism; Anti-Stalinism
- Political position: Far-left
- Colours: Red

Website
- https://communistparty.co.uk/

The Communist Party of Great Britain (Provisional Central Committee) (CPGB-PCC), officially known as just the Communist Party of Great Britain is a political group which publishes the Weekly Worker newspaper.

The group originated around The Leninist, a factional journal inside the Communist Party of Great Britain (CPGB) before forming a "Provisional Central Committee" in 1989 with the stated goal of re-establishing the CPGB.

== History ==
The CPGB-PCC originated as a faction of the Communist Party of Great Britain (CPGB), in opposition to the Eurocommunists within the party. The faction was grouped around the journal The Leninist, which began publishing in November 1981. The journal was published by Leninists in the CPGB alongside the youth wing of the New Communist Party of Britain which had been expelled from that party in 1979. The Leninist's founding statement declared that there was an "ideological crisis that has become chronic in our ranks." The faction related the instability in the CPGB at the time as going back to Stalin and the Popular Front.

The Leninist held its first conference in January 1984, in which the journal switched to a monthly paper in order to better propagandise Leninism and advocate for pro-Partyism.

In November 1989, the group held a conference to form a revolutionary wing of the CPGB, renaming itself to the "Provisional Central Committee of the Communist Party of Great Britain". The Provisional name was due to the stated aim to re-establish the CPGB.

During the August Coup, the group showed support for the State Emergency Committee, stating that their actions were done to prevent a counterrevolution against the Soviet Union.

The CPGB dissolved itself in 1991, and The Leninist group continued as an independent organisation. The group began calling itself the Communist Party of Great Britain in 1992.

The party stood in four seats at the 1992 United Kingdom general election, and in the 1993 Newbury by-election.

In 1999, the group stood candidates for two UK constituencies in the European elections. The "Communist Party" label had been awarded to the Communist Party of Britain. Prevented from using the CPGB name, it stood as 'Weekly Worker'.

In 2015, the CPGB (PCC) supported Jeremy Corbyn in the 2015 Labour Party leadership election, leading to allegations that the party encouraged members to join in order to boost Corbyn's popularity.

=== Weekly Worker ===
In 1993, the organisation's paper became the Weekly Worker, a newspaper which included contributions from people who were not members of the group, like Boris Kagarlitsky and Paul Le Blanc.

== Platform ==
The CPGB-PCC claims to have "an internationalist duty to uphold the principle, 'One state, one party'. To the extent that the European Union becomes a state then that necessitates EU-wide trade unions and a Communist Party of the EU". In addition, it is in favour of the unification of the entire working class under a new Communist International.

While the party is seen as similar to the Communist Party of Britain, its platform is more focused on anti-Stalinism and building alliances on the far-left. It sees Stalinism as counterrevolutionary, and is more aligned with the ideas presented by Karl Kautsky, expressed through the writings of Mike Macnair who sits on the central committee of the party.

== Organisation ==
The CPGB-PCC co-operates with left-wing groups instead of regularly standing in elections on its own. In the mid 1990s, the group was active in the Socialist Alliance. The party has also previously worked with Respect and Left Unity.

Additionally, the party has promoted groups like the Scottish Socialist Alliance and the London Socialist Alliance.
