= Ken Coates (politician) =

British politician and writer (1930–2010)

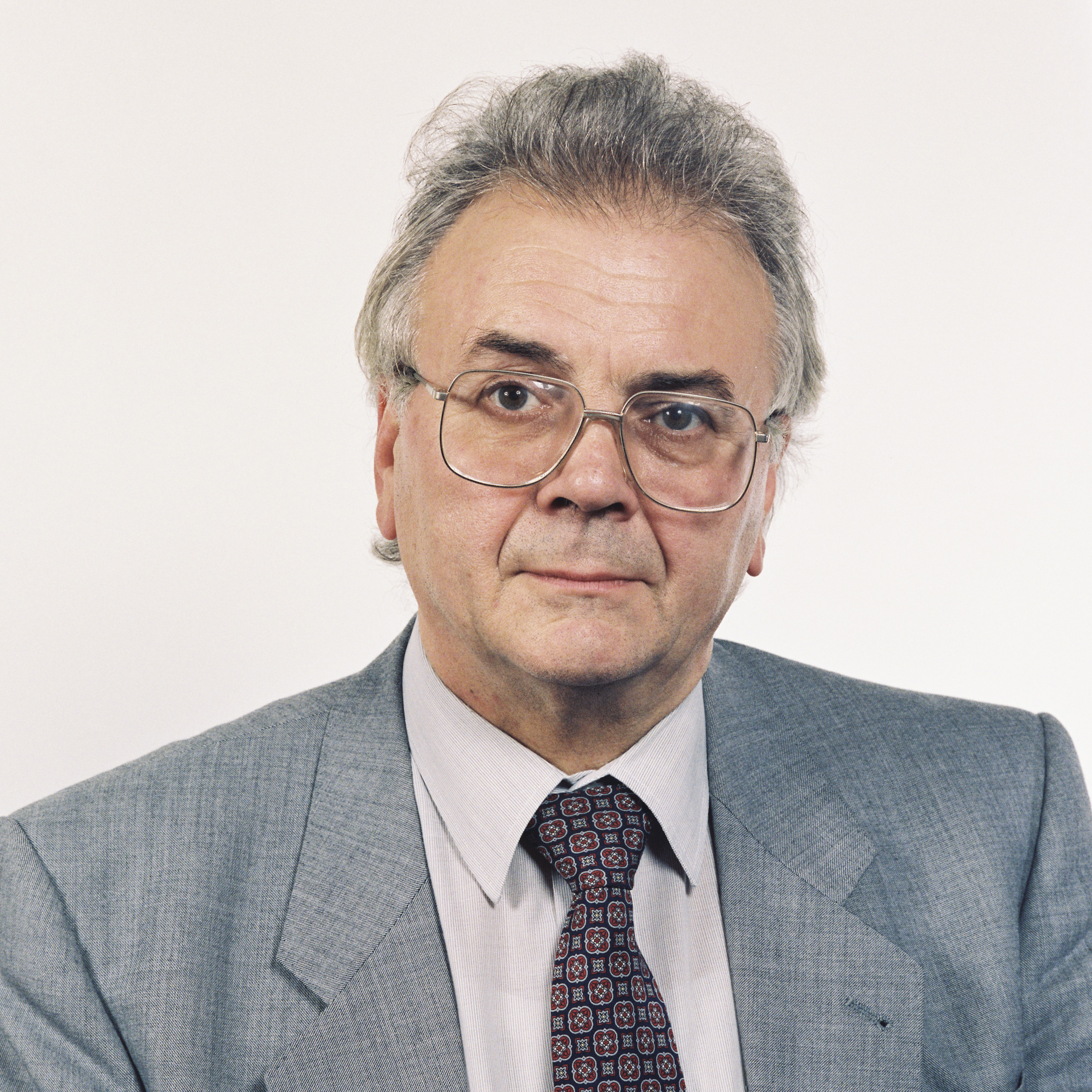
- Official portrait as a Member of the European Parliament

Member of the European Parliament
- In office 18 June 1989 – 13 June 1999
- Preceded by: Michael Kilby (1989); Constituency established (1994)
- Succeeded by: Constituency abolished
- Constituency: Nottingham (until 1994); Nottinghamshire North and Chesterfield (from 1994)

Personal details
- Born: 16 September 1930 Leek, Staffordshire, United Kingdom
- Died: 27 June 2010 (aged 79)
- Party: Labour (until 1998)
- Other political affiliations: Independent (from 1998); European United Left/Nordic Green Left; Communist Party of Great Britain (c. 1945–1948)

Kenneth Sidney Coates (16 September 1930 – 27 June 2010) was a British politician and writer. He chaired the Bertrand Russell Peace Foundation (BRPF) and edited The Spokesman, the BRPF magazine launched in March 1970. He was a Member of the European Parliament from the Labour Party from 1989 to 1998 until his expulsion, and was then an independent member of GUE/NGL from 1998 to 1999. Coates also played leading roles in the Institute for Workers' Control and European Nuclear Disarmament.

== Early years ==
Coates was born in Leek, Staffordshire, and was brought up in Worthing, West Sussex, where he was educated at Worthing High School for Boys. When called up for national service in 1948, he chose to become a coal miner rather than be conscripted into the British army to fight in the Malayan Emergency. He later won a scholarship in 1956 to the University of Nottingham and achieved a first in Sociology.

After the war, he joined the Communist Party of Great Britain but left following the breach between Joseph Stalin and Josip Broz Tito, whom he defended. After the 1956 Soviet invasion of Hungary, Coates and Pat Jordan became the focal point of a group of Marxists with a developing interest in Trotskyism. After attending the fifth world congress of the Fourth International in 1958, of which they were very critical, Coates played a central role in founding the International Group, forerunner of the International Marxist Group.

== Political career and European Parliament ==
Coates contested Nottingham South in 1983, but lost by several thousand votes.

From 1989 to 1998 he was a Labour Party member of the European Parliament, and spent five years as president of its Human Rights Subcommittee. In 1998 Coates was expelled from the Labour Party because he left the Party of European Socialists to join the European United Left/Nordic Green Left in the European Parliament, after criticising New Labour's move to the right.

It was while a member of the European Parliament that Coates was in contact with Vadim Zagladin, one of Mikhail Gorbachev's advisors, about the idea of a joint meeting between the European Parliament and the Supreme Soviet. Coates persuaded the European Parliament to explore the possibility of such a joint meeting, as a practical way of exploring Gorbachev's call for a 'common European home' and supporting his democratic reforms. Eduard Shevardnadze, the Soviet foreign minister, visited the European Parliament, and said he would be willing to be present at a joint meeting. Coates visited Zagladin in Moscow, who offered a four-point programme of stages for realisation of the Joint Special Session, as it came to be known.

Coates pioneered a number of initiatives to help focus the institutions of European civil society beginning with a very successful Pensioners' Parliament, and also including a special Parliament of Disabled People, and two Europe-wide conferences of unemployed people. He strongly supported the Delors programme for full employment in Europe, and became rapporteur of the Parliament's Temporary Committee on Employment, which carried two major reports with almost unanimous support of the European Parliament.

== Author and academic ==
Coates was the co-author, with Tony Topham, of the official history of the Transport and General Workers' Union, among numerous other books on poverty, political philosophy, democratic and humanistic socialism, social and economic issues, peace and disarmament as well as on democracy and human rights. His book The Case of Nikolai Bukharin (Nottingham: Spokesman, 1978) is regarded by some to have served as the international basis for the rehabilitation of that Bolshevik leader. He also continued to support the democratic left in Eastern Europe, and was a member of the advisory board of the Novi Plamen magazine.

Coates was special professor in the Department of Adult Education at the University of Nottingham (1990–2004).

=== Books written or co-written ===
- St Ann's: Poverty, deprivation and morale in a Nottingham Community, with Richard Silburn, University of Nottingham, 1967 & Spokesman 2007
- Industrial Democracy in Great Britain, with Tony Topham, MacGibbon & Kee, 1967
- The Dirty War in Mr. Wilson, Vietnam Solidarity Campaign, 1967
- Workers' Control: A Book of Readings and Witnesses for Workers' Control, ISBN 978-0-85124-699-4, McGibbon and Kee 1968
- A Future for British Socialism?, Editor, Centre for Socialist Education, 1968
- Can the workers run industry?, Editor, Sphere, 1968
- Czechoslovakia and Socialism, Editor, Bertrand Russell Peace Foundation, 1969
- How and Why Industry Must Be Democratised, with Wyn Williams, Institute for Workers' Control, 1969
- The Debate on Workers' Control, Editor and Contributor, Institute for Workers' Control, 1970
- Poverty: The Forgotten Englishmen, ISBN 978-0-85124-375-7, Penguin Books 1970 & Spokesman Books 2007
- The Crisis of British Socialism, Spokesman Books 1971 Spokesman Books publish books by Bertrand Russell and The Spokesman journal.
- Prevent the Crime of Silence, Editor, Allen Lane, 1971
- Essays on Industrial Democracy, Spokesman Books, 1971
- Essays on Socialist Humanism, Editor, Spokesman, 1971
- The New Unionism: the case for worker's control, with Tony Topham, Penguin Books, 1974. ISBN 0-14-021811-4
- Socialism and the Environment, Editor, Spokesman, 1972
- Detente and Socialist Democracy, Editor, Spokesman, 1975
- Beyond Wage Slavery, Spokesman, 1977
- Democracy in the Labour Party, Spokesman, 1977
- The Shop Stewards' Guide to the Bullock Report, with Tony Topham, Spokesman, 1977
- The Just Society, Edited with Fred Singleton, Spokesman, 1977
- The Right to Useful Work, Editor, with Mike Cooley Spokesman, 1977
- The Case of Nikoli Bukharin, Spokesman, 1978
- What Went Wrong, Editor, Spokesman, 1979
- Trade Unions in Britain, with Tony Topham, ISBN 978-0-00-686121-8, Spokesman, 1980 & Fontana Press, 1988
- Beyond the Bulldozer, with Richard Silburn, University of Nottingham, 1980 & ISBN 0-902031-43-0, Spokesman 1987
- How to Win, Editor, Spokesman, 1981
- Work-ins, Sit-ins and Industrial Democracy, Spokesman, 1981
- Eleventh Hour for Europe, Editor, Spokesman, 1981
- Heresies, Spokesman, 1982
- The Social Democrats: Those who went and those who stayed, Spokesman 1983
- The Most Dangerous Decade, Spokesman 1984
- Trade unions and politics, with Tony Topham, ISBN 0-631-13753-X, Basil Blackwell, Oxford, 1986
- China and the Bomb, Spokesman 1986
- Joint Action for Jobs, A New Internationalism, Editor, Spokesman 1986
- Perestroika: Global Challenge, Editor, Spokesman 1988
- Think Globally, Act Locally, Spokesman 1988
- The History of the Transport and General Workers' Union, with Tony Topham, ISBN 978-0-85124-565-2, Basil Blackwell 1991 & Spokesman 1994
- Human Rights in the World, Spokesman 1992
- A European Recovery Programme: Restoring Full Employment, Edited with Michael Barratt Brown, Spokesman 1993
- Common Ownership: Clause Four and the Labour Party, Spokesman 1995
- The Right to Work: The Loss of Our First Freedom, Editor, Spokesman 1995
- Full Employment for Europe, with Stuart Holland, Spokesman 1995
- Dear Commissioner, Spokesman 1996
- The Blair Revelation: Deliverance for whom?, with Michael Barratt Brown, Spokesman 1996
- Community Under Attack, with Michael Barratt Brown, Spokesman 1997
- Full Employment: A European Appeal, Spokesman 1998
- Workers' Control: Another World Is Possible, ISBN 978-0-85124-682-6, Spokesman Books 2003
- Empire No More, ISBN 978-0-85124-694-9, Spokesman Books 2004
