= The Week (1964) =

The Week was a socialist magazine founded by Ken Coates and Pat Jordan in January 1964. The magazine was edited by Ken Coates and Robin Blackburn (nominally) between 1964-1966 with the first editorial, 'By the way of Introduction' stating:

The Week, whilst not having a long statement of aims, will support every endeavor to achieve the election of a Labour Government with a socialist policy; will support the struggle of the colonial peoples for national and social liberation; will sympathetically report news of the fight against monolithism in the communist countries; and will defend the ideas of socialist democracy against all who oppose them.

During the 1964-1966 period The Week was edited and produced in Nottingham under active Coates’ editorship and steadily grew into a broad, widely read and highly regarded publication with considerable support across the labour movement. Whilst many of those who worked on the publication shared membership with the International Group, which subsequently became the International Marxist Group (IMG), The Week was not doctrinal during this period.

Rather, it dedicated itself to reporting on and analysing political events in the world including the British Labour Party, trade unions, peace campaigns and associated international events. At the same time, it endorsed and supported organisational efforts of the socialist movement in the UK: from early agitation around the Vietnam War, the nascent Workers’ Control movement, international solidarity initiatives, trade union disputes and the organisation of broad socialist initiatives. In this sense, it established a pattern for later publications associated with Coates.

When Harold Wilson expelled Ken Coates from the Labour Party, he ceased as named editor. Although The Week endured after Coates ceased to be editor, the direction and tone changed markedly. After 1966 Jordan produced The Week as the journal of the International Group and aimed at a readership in the left wing of the Labour Party. Coates and Jordan were Marxist members of the Labour Party connected to the New Left Review, to which Marxist journalist Claud Cockburn occasionally contributed. Their version of The Week, named after the earlier The Week that had been edited by Cockburn, provided a socialist critique of Harold Wilson's government, notably over its failure to oppose the Vietnam War. Jordan edited the paper until 1968, when he cooperated with Tariq Ali in launching The Black Dwarf. At that time The Week became a monthly magazine called International, which was published by the International Marxist Group.
