= HULC =

HULC may refer to:

- Human Universal Load Carrier, an anthropomorphic exoskeleton
- HULC (gene), the gene
- Hull University Labour Club, the student society
- Handheld Universal Lunar Camera, the Artemis lunar exploration camera
