= Vietnam Solidarity Campaign =

Vietnam War-era activist group

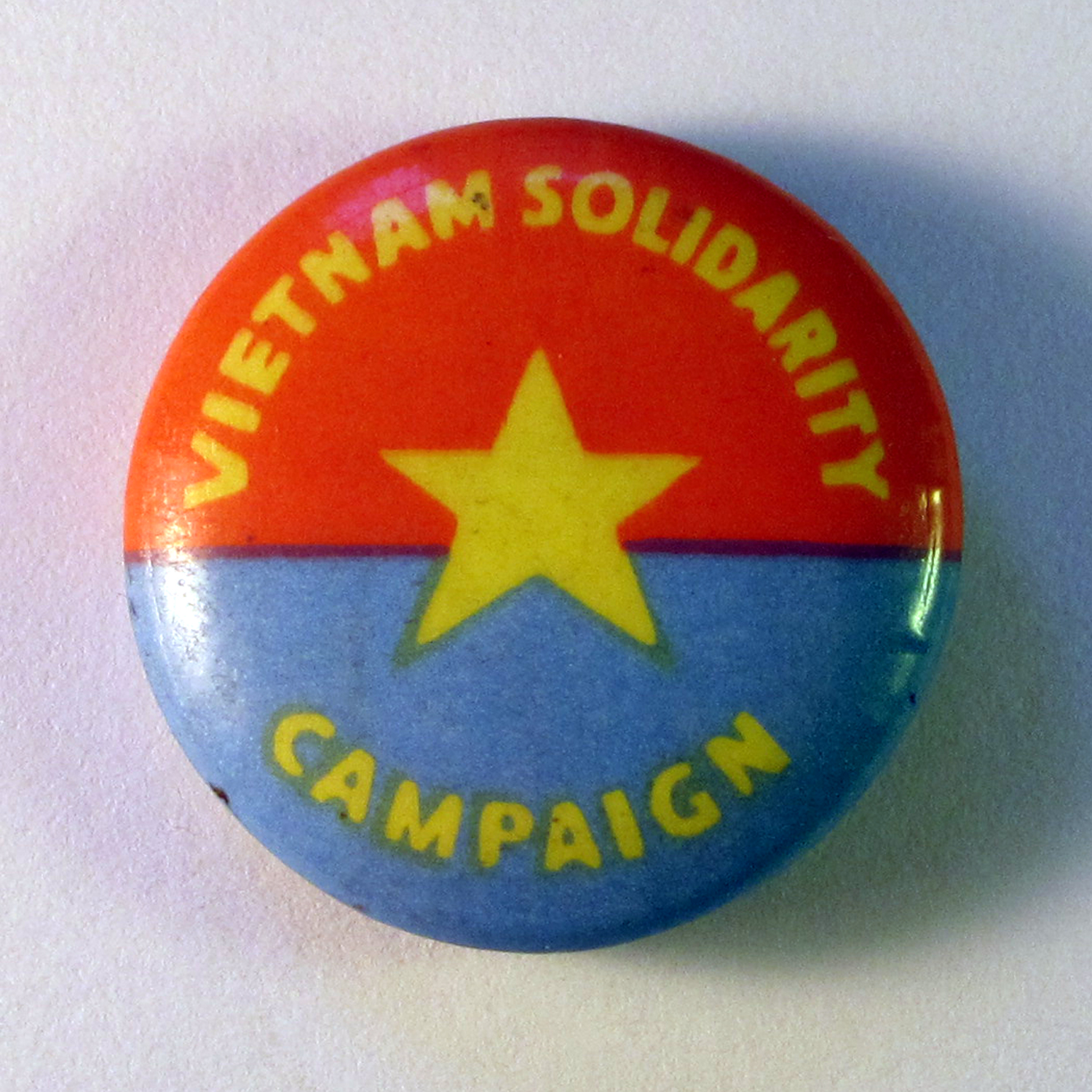
- A Vietnam Solidarity Campaign badge
- Abbreviation: VSC
- Formation: 1966
- Type: Solidarity campaign
- Purpose: Opposition to Vietnam war
- Location: United Kingdom
- Board of directors: Ralph Schoenman
- Publication: Vietnam Solidarity Campaign Bulletin
- Parent organisation: International Group/Interrnational Marxist Group

The Vietnam Solidarity Campaign (VSC) was a political action group set up in 1966 by activists around the International Group. The group was also set up with the personal and financial support of Bertrand Russell.

Ralph Schoenman acted both as Director of the Vietnam Solidarity Campaign and as executive director of the Bertrand Russell Peace Foundation. Marxist activists including Tariq Ali, Ernie Tate, Al Richardson, David Horowitz, John La Rose and Pat Jordan also played a key role.

Members of the International Socialists were involved in the VSC, but the group was firmly controlled by the IMG.

It organised a demonstration of 20,000 people in October 1967 that for the first time ignored police warnings not to enter Grosvenor Square, where the United States Embassy in London was then located. A major demonstration in October 1968, sponsored by the VSC, had an estimated 100,000 participants marching to Trafalgar Square. Serious police violence was captured by press and television cameras during the March protest. The October demonstration was carefully planned to avoid any opportunity for a repeat performance, resulting in a peaceful march of 200,000 people across London. According to its newsletter, VSC branches were active in many British cities -- Glasgow, Sheffield, Leeds, Liverpool, Manchester, Nottingham and Swansea. Even small towns, including Falkirk, counted VSC members.

The VSC was distinct from other groups as it strongly supported the victory of the National Liberation Front for South Vietnam.

The Vietnam Solidarity Campaign consistently badgered Harold Wilson and his government over Vietnam. Every issue of the Vietnam Solidarity Campaign Bulletin contained a special section on "British Complicity" in the war, usually focusing on military R&D carried on by industry and universities. In its Vietnam Handbook (1972) the VSC devoted a major chapter to "British Complicity," accusing Wilson of cutting a "shabby figure" as he consistently supported U.S. policy in Vietnam. The campaign also picketed firms which were known to supply the US military including the Dow Chemical Company's UK operations and the Elliot Automation factory in Lewisham.

== Fake news incident ==
Following the death of theoretical physicist Stephen Hawking in March 2018, the Latin American news site teleSUR reposted a photograph from the National Portrait Gallery collections on their Facebook page, purporting to show him leading a VSC demonstration alongside Ali and Vanessa Redgrave in March 1968. The image was then shared by thousands of users on Facebook and Twitter, and was later picked up by other media outlets including The Guardian. However, Ali and Redgrave both disputed the accuracy of the claim, and the National Portrait Gallery has since stated that the photograph does not show Hawking. In 2018 the fact checking website Alt News was able to prove that the person in the image was not Hawking by comparing the photograph with genuine images of the scientist.
