= Ernie Tate =

Irish Trotskyist (1934–2021)

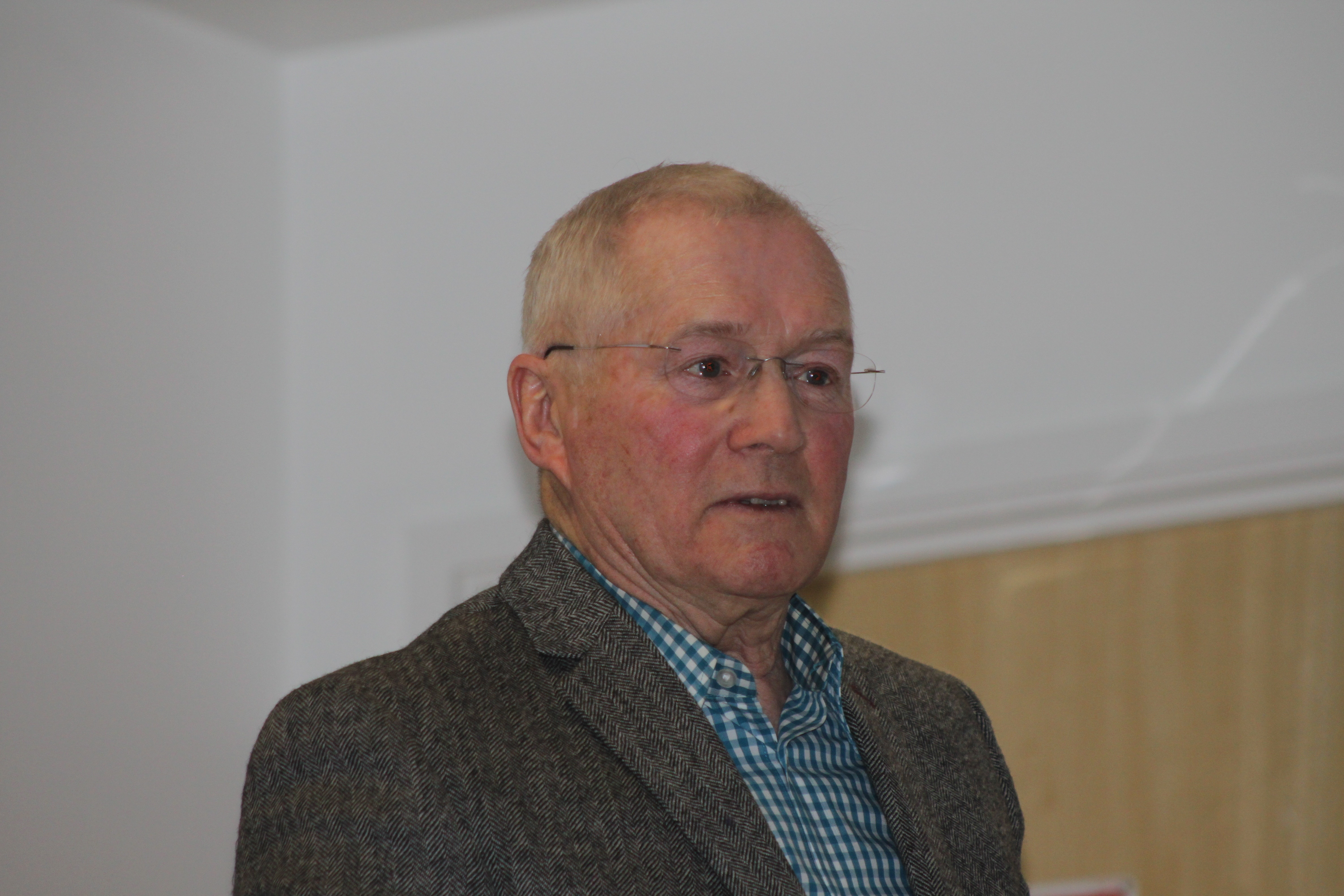
Ernie Tate speaking at a meeting in London, 1 February 2014

Ernie Tate (24 May 1934 – 5 February 2021) was a long-standing supporter and leading member of Trotskyist groups in Canada and the United Kingdom, and a founder in the 1960s of the International Marxist Group and Vietnam Solidarity Campaign in Britain.

Born on Shankill Road, in Belfast, Northern Ireland to an Ulster Protestant family, he received little formal education, leaving school at 14 to work at the Belfast Flour Mills as an apprentice machine attendant.

Though Protestant, he became sympathetic to Irish Republicanism after befriending a Catholic co-worker and began thinking of himself as a communist after being on holiday in Paris and encountering and being inspired by left-wing demonstrations celebrating the French defeat at the Battle of Dien Bien Phu.

He worked in the mill until 1955, when he emigrated to Canada at the age of 21. Within a year, he was recruited by Ross Dowson into the Canadian section of the Fourth International, after dropping into the Socialist Education League's Toronto Labour Bookstore on Yonge Street (in 1961, the SEL became the League for Socialist Action). By 1962, he was joint editor of the Socialist Caucus Bulletin, the newspaper of the socialist caucus of the New Democratic Party.

In 1960, he was charged with public vandalism after spraypainting "Ban the Bomb" on the side of a plywood and cement fallout shelter at Queen's Park. Unrepentant, he was fined $50.

Tate was sent to British Columbia in the early 1960s, tasked with consolidating the quarrelling factions of the LSA's Vancouver branch.

In 1965, Tate moved from North America to Great Britain on an assignment to work with supporters of the reunified Fourth International to solidify its British section, of which he became a leader, leading to the founding of the International Marxist Group in 1968. Tate and fellow Canadian Pat Brain worked alongside Bertrand Russell in the Russell Tribunal set up to investigate US war crimes in Vietnam.

Tate was hospitalized in 1966 after being allegedly beaten by supporters of Gerry Healy while selling a pamphlet critical of him outside a public meeting of Healy's group. Healy was allegedly present and "essentially supervised" the assault. The incident became a cause célèbre within the world Trotskyist movement. Healy's Socialist Labour League filed lawsuits against Peace News and Socialist Leader for repeating the allegations, threatening them with bankruptcy, prompting the two publications to issue retractions and a public apology. The incident resulted in Isaac Deutscher, who had previously been a contributor to Healy's publications, summoning both Healy and Tate to his home where he "upbraided" Healy for his alleged thuggery and broke off relations with him.

One of Tate's recruits to the IMG was Tariq Ali. Ali described Tate as working closely with Pat Jordan, the two being the leading supporters of Pierre Frank's ideas in the UK.

Tate was one of two members of the Vietnam Solidarity Campaign organising committee for the demonstration against the Vietnam war in London in October 1968 who successfully opposed a proposal to halt the march in Whitehall, which would have caused unnecessary confrontation with the police and a degeneration into violence. He was thus instrumental in ensuring that the 200,000 participants passed through London peacefully, despite dire prognostications in the press and on television (who reported the march but also gave coverage to a simultaneous 5,000-strong violent counter-protest by Maoists attacking the United States Embassy). As a result, opposition to the war grew enormously in Britain at the same time as in the United States. At the time of the demonstration, The Guardian described him as "an able Ulsterman in his early thirties, with unmodishly short dark hair, the black-rimmed spectacles of an advertising executive, and a terse, direct, manner".

Tate was a founder of the Leninist Trotskyist Tendency in 1973. He returned to Canada in 1969.

Tate's first job in Canada was at Eaton's department store in Toronto which he quit after receiving his first paycheque for only $60. He went on to do factory work at Maple Leaf Milling, Radio Valve, and Amalgamated Electric. Returning to Canada, he was passed over for a paid position with the LSA, and instead found work as a stationary engineer with Canada Packers and became a union steward for the Packinghouse Workers Union.

Tate earned a diploma in Mechanical Engineering Technology from Ryerson Polytechnical Institute in 1975, winning academic prizes for his essays, and joined Domtar where he became chief engineer. He joined Toronto Hydro in 1977 as a stationary engineer, later working in positions in marketing, energy management and conservation positions at the electric utility. During the 1990s, the utility assigned him to Toronto City Hall where he was responsible for liaising between the utility and the municipal government. He was chief steward during a successful 1989 strike and then was vice-president of CUPE Local One for years before his retirement in 1995, but went on to organize a successful against the provincial government of Mike Harris's attempt to privatize Ontario Hydro.

In 2014, the first volume of his memoir, Revolutionary Activism in the 1950s & 60s, was published. After reading the book, David Horowitz, who had known Tate in the 1960s when both men were anti-war activists, struck up a dialogue with him, but noted that their strong political differences barred any friendship.

In 2019, Tate was the featured speaker at an international conference on the life and work of Leon Trotsky held in Havana, Cuba.

In November 2020, Tate provided witness testimony to the Undercover Policing Inquiry in London. Ailing, he was unable to attend in person and provided his testimony in writing. His answers to questions about police surveillance and infiltration of the Vietnam Solidarity Campaign and the anti-Vietnam War protests it organised in 1967 and 1968 were read into the inquiry's record.

He died from pancreatic cancer on 5 February 2021.
