= Nottinghamshire North and Chesterfield (European Parliament constituency) =

Former European Parliament constituency

- European Parliament constituency
- Boundary within the East Midlands (1994-1999)
- Member state: United Kingdom
- Created: 1994
- Dissolved: 1999
- MEPs: 1

Nottinghamshire North and Chesterfield was a European Parliament constituency covering parts of Derbyshire and Nottinghamshire in England.

Prior to its uniform adoption of proportional representation in 1999, the United Kingdom used first-past-the-post for the European elections in England, Scotland and Wales. The European Parliament constituencies used under that system were smaller than the later regional constituencies and only had one Member of the European Parliament each.

The constituency was created in 1994 from parts of Sheffield, Derbyshire, Lincolnshire and Nottingham, and consisted of the Westminster Parliament constituencies of Bassetlaw, Bolsover, Chesterfield, Mansfield, Newark, North East Derbyshire and Sherwood.

== Members of the European Parliament ==
Year	Name	Party
1994	Ken Coates	Labour
1998	Ken Coates	Independent Labour Network

== Results ==
European Parliament election, 1994: Nottinghamshire North and Chesterfield
Party	Candidate	Votes	%	±%
Labour	Ken Coates	114,353	63.1	
Conservative	Dirk N. D. Hazell	38,093	21.0	
Liberal Democrats	Susan D. Pearce	21.936	12.1	
Green	A. G. (Guy) Jones	5.159	2.9	
Natural Law	Sue I. Lincoln	1,632	0.9	
Majority		76,260	42.1	
Turnout		181,173	36.9	
Labour hold		Swing		
