= Michael Kilby =

British politician

Michael Leopold Kilby MEP
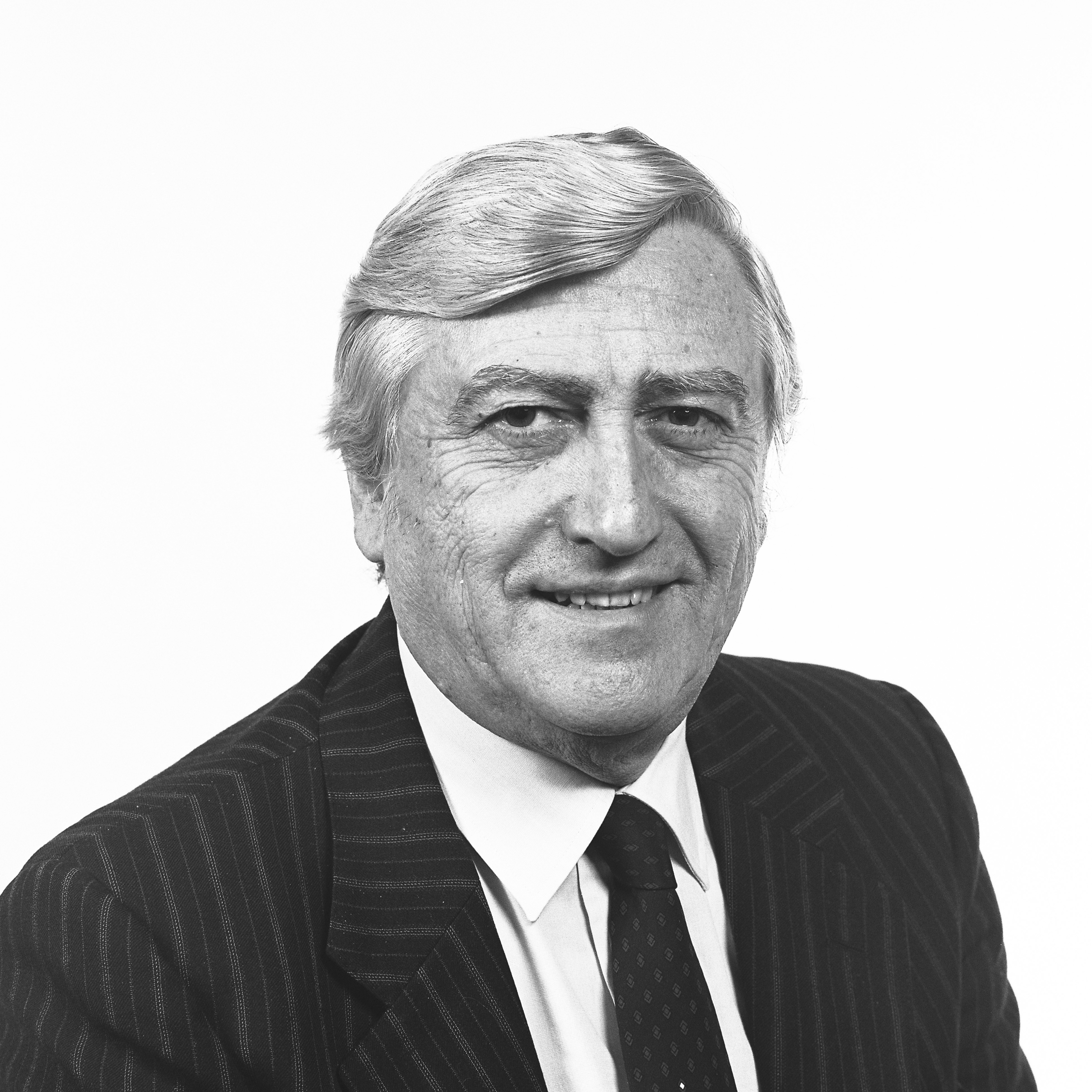
- Official MEP portrait

Member of the European Parliament for East of England
- In office 14 June 1984 – 15 June 1989
- Preceded by: Michael Gallagher
- Succeeded by: Ken Coates

Personal details
- Born: 3 September 1924 Dunstable, Bedfordshire, England
- Died: 9 September 2008 (aged 84) Hawkhurst, Kent, England
- Party: Conservative

Michael Leopold Kilby (3 September 1924 – 9 September 2008) was a British Conservative politician who served as a Member of the European Parliament for Nottingham between 1984 and 1989.

Prior to his election as a Member of the European Parliament, he had served as the mayor of Dunstable in 1963–64. A keen cricketer, he played minor counties cricket for Bedfordshire from 1950–55, making 15 appearances in the Minor Counties Championship. He died in September 2008 at Hawkhurst, Kent.
