= Hull University Labour Club =

Hull University Labour Club HULC
- Founded: 1967
- Preceded by: Hull University Socialist Society, Hull College Labour Society
- Political position: Centre Left
- European Parliament group: Progressive Alliance of Socialists and Democrats
- Affiliations: Labour Party (UK); Labour Students
- Colours: Red

Hull University Labour Club (HULC) is a Hull University Union society for University of Hull students who support the Labour Party. It is one of the oldest societies at Hull, first formed as the Hull College Labour Society from 1952–1958, the Hull University Socialist Society from 1958–1967, and the Hull University Labour Club from September 1967.

Influential in the earlier stages of the National Association of Labour Students Organisations (NALSO) in the 1950s, it has also had a role in the National Union of Students, Labour Students and Young Labour movements since their individual formations. Most notable was their large involvement in local and national campaigning in the 1960s and the 2015 general election. Their influence has waned in recent years but is starting to experience a renewal.

Membership levels took a significant decline in the period between 2010 and 2015 but have since started to increase since 2016.

== Current membership ==
After 2010 membership levels had declined significantly, resulting in roughly five active members following the 2015 general election. However, membership has risen dramatically since the 2015/2016 academic year. In March 2023, Adam Coles was re-elected to the position of Co-Chair for his third term. He is the only person in HULC’s history to hold the position more than once, however left the University before he could serve his third term.

Their executive consists of seven positions. In 2018 the club adopted the Co-Chair model. Elections are held in March. Their 2024/25 executive committee are:

- Co-Chairs: Millie Wood & Harriet Barker
- Vice President: James Richardson
- Campaign Coordinator: James Richardson
- Women's Officer: Hannah Parrish
- Social Secretary: Jonah Gregory
- Westminster Attaché: Oscar Seal
- Treasurer: Finn Anderson
- Wellbeing and Inclusion Officer: Ryan Atherton

=== Past Chairs ===
- 2024/25 – Oscar Seal & Sofiya Koç
- 2023/24 – Jack Stephenson & Daniel Wilton
- 2022/23 – Adam Coles & Robson Augusta
- 2021/22 – Adam Coles & Jake Croft
- 2020/21 – Jack Wilfan & Jack Stafford^{††††}
- 2019/20 – Daniel Eales & Maya Booth
- 2018/19 – Jessica Raspin & Mark Porchske^{†††}
- 2017/18 – George Aylett
- 2016/17 – Christopher Knott
- 2015/16 – Josh Capstick^{†}
- 2014/15 – Adam Allnutt^{††}
- 2013/14 – Frank Longdon
- 2012/13 – Rosie Corrigan
- 2011/12 – Jon Chambers
- 2010/11 – Victoria Winterton
- 2009/10 – Kaveh Azzarhoosh
- 2008/09 – Joshua Haringman
- 2007/08 – Emma Kinloch
- 2006/07 – Ed Marsh
- 2005/06 – Helen Gibson
- 2004/05 – Matthew Patrick
- 1991/92 – Tom Watson

^{†}Stood down during his tenure, replaced with then-Vice-Chair Christopher Knott.

^{††}Stood down during his tenure to run for President of the Hull University Union, replaced with then-Vice-Chair Josh Capstick.

^{†††}Stood down during his tenure. Jessica Raspin remained as Chair for the continuation of the year.

^{††††}Stood down during his tenure. The post remained vacant throughout the year.

=== Accolades ===
- 2016/17 – All available societies stripes.
- 2014/15 – Networking Award for Outstanding Inter-society Co-ordination
- 2014/15 – Societies' Gold Award.
- 2013/14 – Society of the Month for January 2014
- 2013/14 – Societies' Gold Award

== History ==
=== Left-Wing Student Activism at Hull College, 1927–1950 ===
From 1927 – Hull University’s foundation as a tiny College of the University of London, with just 200 students – up until 1950, very little is known about left-wing student politics in Hull. We do know that before it folded 1935 a "Socialist Group" was active in the College, and that the Hull-born working-class gay author Dan Billany (1913-c.1943) was Secretary. Billany, however, never aligned himself to the Labour Party and was a member of the Socialist Party of Great Britain (SPGB), until his expulsion for reasons which the SPGB has never divulged. Hull College registrar's files record no Labour Club existing in 1946 and list as the only "Contentious Societies" on campus at this time as: the Catholic Society; the Student Christian Movement (SCM); and the Socialist Society. It is conceivable, although not known for certain, that no society called "the Labour Club" existed in Hull during the 1930s or 1940s. This was before the era of university grants. Poor, working-class students like Billany (who himself only managed to come to Hull College through a much-coveted scholarship) were the exception on campus, and so didn't provide a significant pool from which to draw Club members.

It is, however, likely that left-wing students played some role in the protests against Oswald Mosley's British Union of Fascists (BUF) when they marched in Hull in 1936 and 1937, the former being the largest BUF rally in Britain outside London during the period. In 1943, there was much trade union and student protest across the country against the British Foreign Secretary Herbert Morrison's decision to release Oswald Mosley from prison. For many on the left, Morrison's action was considered a betrayal of the troops fighting fascism across the world. One former club member, active in the early-1960s, has spoken of a letter from Herbert Morrison, dated from 1942, justifying his policy to Hull students. It allegedly remained in club executive hands, passed on from member-to-member, although no trace of it has been found and Kevin McNamara has denied ever having seen such a letter when he was active in the club in the 1950s.

=== The Hull University College Labour Society, 1952 – c. 1958 ===
The political economy of Britain, and with it the social basis of Britain's universities, changed after 1945. The first working-class beneficiaries of the 1944 education reforms, with a strong loyalty to the Labour Party, started to study at Hull in the 1950s, and this had consequent effects on left-wing student politics in Hull. Two such beneficiaries of the 1944 education reforms, future Labour MPs Roy Hattersley and Kevin McNamara, arrived at Hull in 1950 to discover a Socialist Society, but no Labour Club, in operation on campus. This Socialist Society was affiliated to the Student Labour Federation (SLF), an offshoot of the ILP's United Front organisations of the 1930s, which sought to bring together various shades of political opinion under a single anti-fascist umbrella. SLF was one of the more successful of these United Front operations and throughout the war, and afterwards, SLF represented all socialist, labour and other student organisations in Britain.

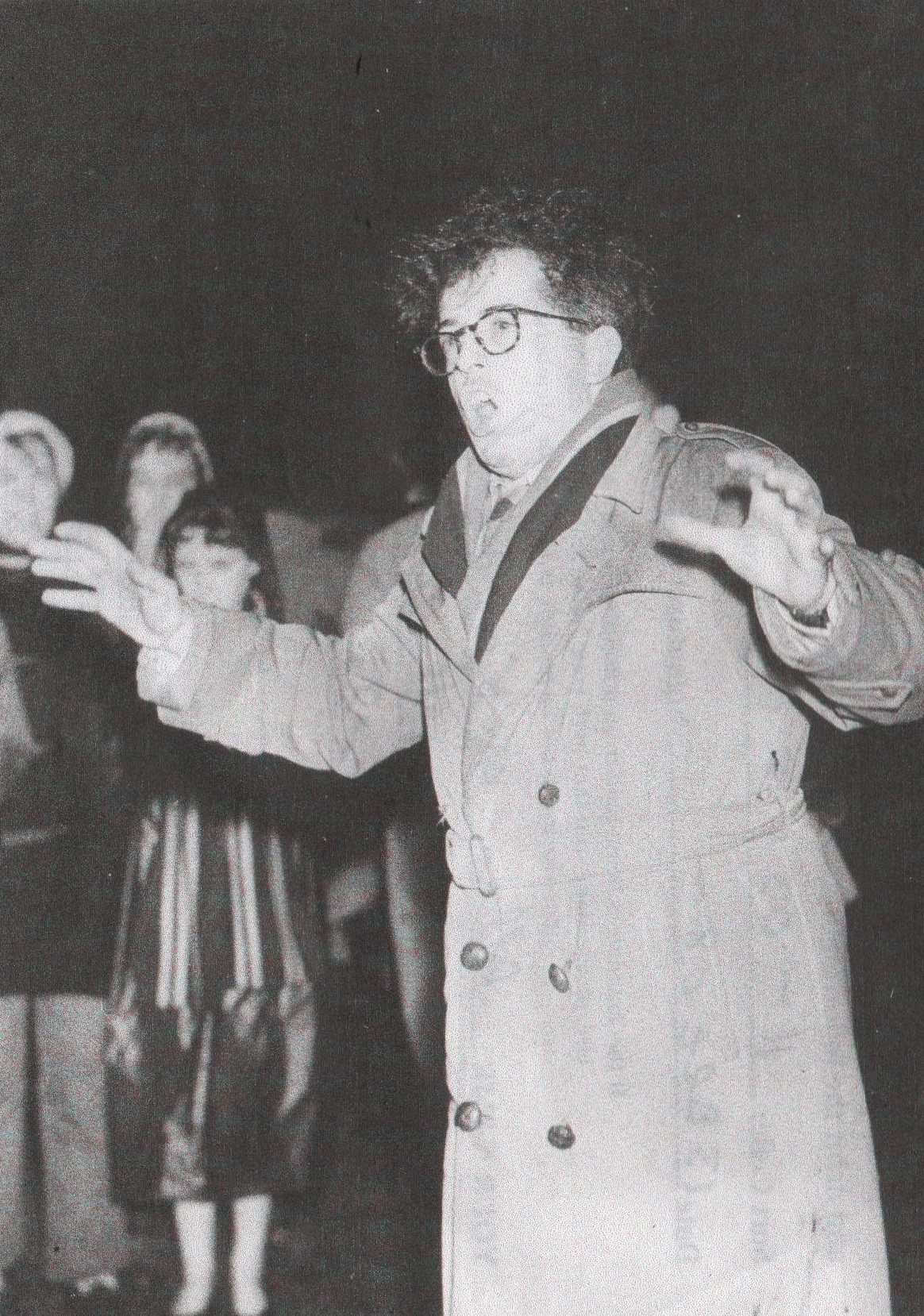
A young Kevin McNamara, then Secretary of Hull University students' union, leading a protest of Hull students in Hull city centre against the Franco-British invasion of Suez in 1956. The University Conservative Association made an attempt to kidnap Kevin during the protest.

In 1946, however, Labour Party-oriented students in Cambridge, Oxford and the LSE created the National Association of Labour Student Organisations (NALSO) as a representative body for all Labour Clubs. As then-confidential NALSO memos to the General Secretary of the Labour Party show, they were keen to combat Marxist influence nationally in the NUS and on campus, and also internationally in the International Union of Socialist Youth (IUSY). The creation of Labour Clubs as separate and distinct from Socialist Societies was part of this strategy. NALSO's annual report of 1957–58 gave an account of left-wing student politics during this period:

"Until 1947 Labour Party supporters in the Universities had been members of SLF ... which had a long and chequered history but which was then, as now, controlled by the Communist Party and so was hostile to the 1945 Labour Government (despite the clause in its constitution which pledged its support to the Labour Party). The SLF still claims to speak for a 'United Left' – but in fact speaks today only for he Communist students and those who are still naive enough to join Socialist Societies affiliated to SLF and support the Kremlin line that almost without exception they adopt."

The political scene in Hull slotted in neatly with the national picture. Thus, in 1952, the bulk of Socialist Society students – led by Roy Hattersley, Kevin McNamara, Fred Moorhouse and Kath Hart – formed the Hull University College Labour Society (Hull didn't become a University until 1954), affiliated to NALSO, as a break-away unit from the Socialist Society. It quickly outgrew the Socialist Society and became the dominant force on campus, playing a key role both in the Hull College Students' Union and NALSO, with Hattersley, Moorhouse and McNamara taking executive positions in both bodies. Hull contributed two NALSO chairmen in the 1950s, Fred Moorhouse (1954–55) and Roy Hattersley (1956–57); only Oxford, with four chairmen, exceeded Hull’s tally in the early stages of NALSO from 1947 to 1959. Cambridge, Glasgow, Manchester, Birckbeck College and Swansea all contributed one chairman, whilst the LSE also contributed two.

One of the first MPs to address the new Society, in Thwaite Hall, was Denis Healey. Hugh Gaitskell, then Labour Party Treasurer, was also the honorary Vice-President of the Society in 1954–55. One of the club's key early focuses was on foreign policy, in part because there was broad cross-party consensus on domestic issues, and in part because the club had a sizeable number of Nigerian members, as well as a couple of Cypriots, who accorded a high priority to colonial policy. The club thus hosted many colonial speakers, most notably in 1953, when, jointly with the Socialist Society, it hosted Cheddi Jagan, the deposed Chief Minister of Guyana, in the joint common room of the University Union. Jagan had been dismissed by the Churchill government and army earlier in the year, under American pressure, due to fears of his Marxist sympathies. In 1956, then-Hull University Union Secretary Kevin McNamara led a march against Anthony Eden's invasion of the Suez, in which he was nearly kidnapped, as a joke, by members of the Hull University Conservative Association. Hattersley and McNamara were also founding members of Hull's debating society.

=== The New Left and Student Politics, 1956– ===
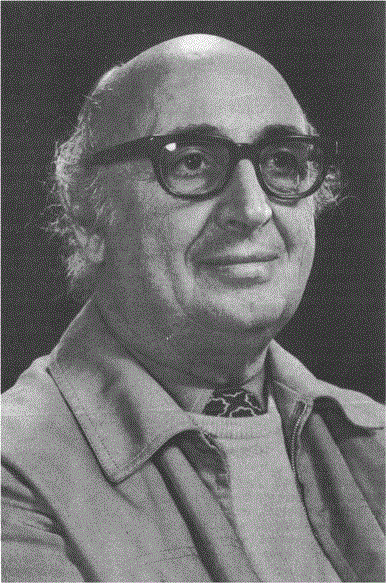
New Left thinker John Saville, reader in economics at the University of Hull, was a particular inspiration for many SocSoc students. He played a role in bringing many left-wing working-class Ruskin College graduates to Hull University, and was also helpful in arranging for his acquaintances in the New Left to come and speak to the Club.

By the mid-1950s, changes in the British left, most notably the formation of the first New Left in Britain, were beginning to have an effect on left-wing student politics in the country. In 1956, Khrushchev's Secret Speech denouncing Stalinism was acquired by the United States and leaked to the world, and – almost simultaneous to the Franco-British invasion of Suez – the Soviets suppressed a democratic socialist revolt in Hungary. Both events spurred on a process of revisionism in the British Communist Party, with many British leftists – notably in Hull, John Saville and Tony Topham, economics lecturer and lecturer on adult education at Hull University, respectively – were expelled from the Communist party during this period for criticising Soviet orthodoxy. These events made many on the British left, including students, more amenable to the Labour party. Stuart Hall, a leading thinker in the New Left, recalled in 2010 how the political scene changed in Oxford when he was an undergraduate in the mid-1950s:

"The Oxford left was very diverse. There was a small number of CP [Communist Party] members ... mainly in Balliol ... Next there was the great body of Labour Club supporters, the majority firmly attached to Fabian Labourist and reformist positions, and a few with their eyes fixed unswervingly on their coming parliamentary careers. Finally there were the 'independents' including some serious Labour people, who were intellectually aligned with neither of these two camps and shuttled somewhat uneasily between them. The locus of our debate was the Socialist Club, a moribund organisation, left more-or-less abandoned since its thirties popular front days, which we resuscitated. It became clear that similar debates were developing in other universities and that there ought to be some common platform for the emerging student left."

A somewhat similar transition took place in Hull University, and eventually the Labour Society changed its name to the Socialist Society. Although still affiliated to NALSO, it had become a broad coalition catering for all shades of socialist opinion. This transition appears to have taken place at some point between 1958–1960, as an article in Hull University's student newspaper, Torchlight, reveals a Labour Society was still in existence as late as 19 March 1958. Herbert Morrison had been the University's guest of honour at the Union Ball that year, and the article reported that:

"A few members of the Labour Society enjoyed tea at University expense, when Bob Cryer entertained Mr Herbert Morrson to a refec. tea before the Union Dinner and Ball. These ardent young men quizzed Mr Morrison on the issues of the day. What did Mr Morrison think about VES? Did he think that the national executive was dominated by men who had no working-class background and who, consequently, could not and did not speak on behalf of labour? Had Labour whitewashed Nasser? And so on. Herbert Morrison took them all in his stride, or rather through a cloud of tobacco fumes. The questioners were not entirely satisfied, but at least they had a genuine representative of the working class, and had a large fine tea."

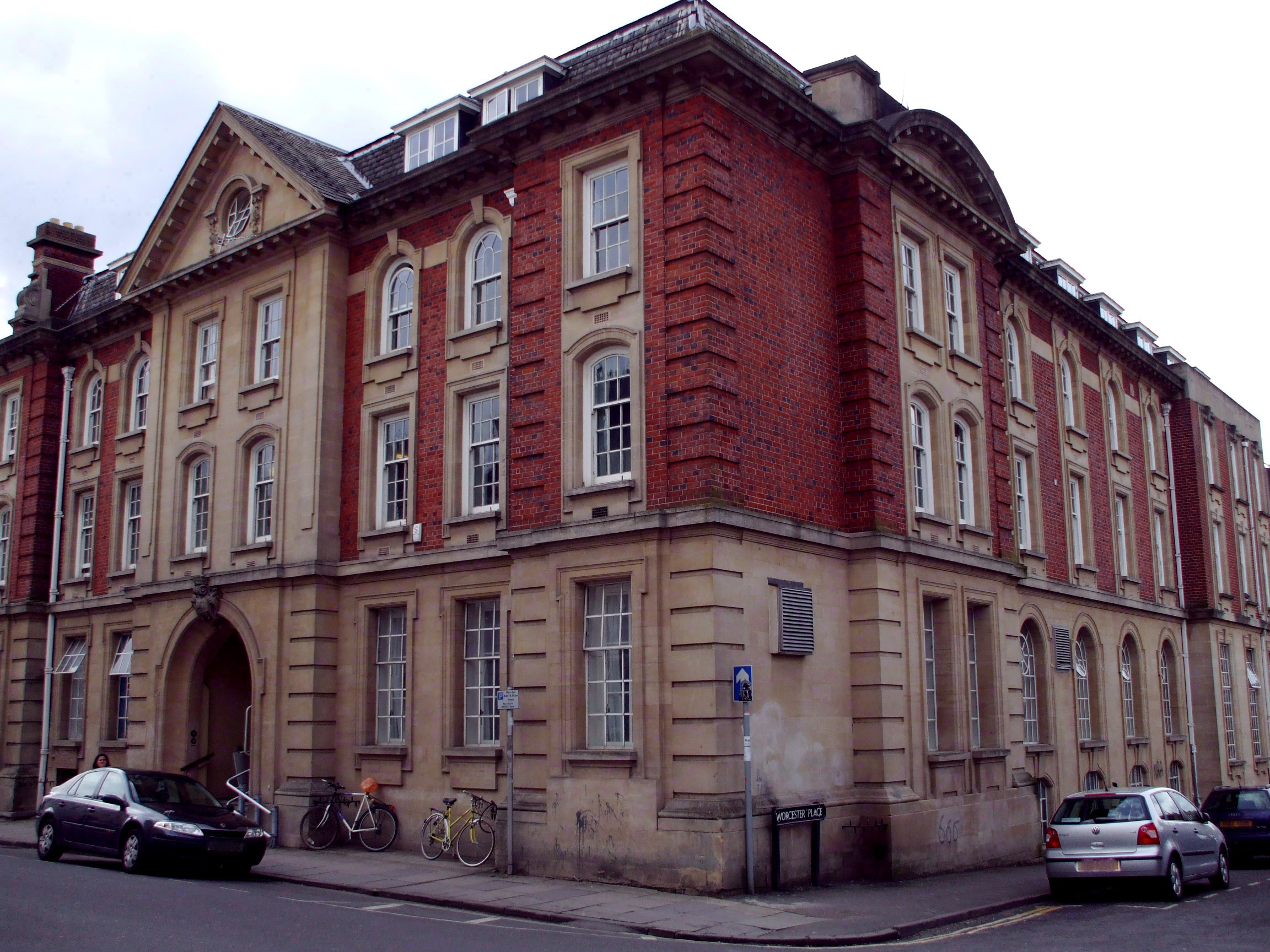
Ruskin College, Oxford, was an institution for adult education for working-class students without any formal qualifications. Many left-wing working-class students came to Hull to take on bachelor's degrees after two years' study at Ruskin, and played quite prominent roles in SocSoc. Two Ruskin students, John Prescott and Harry Barnes, went on to become MPs, and many more took on positions in trade unions and institutions of adult education.

Although SocSoc harboured a vast array of members representing all shades of left-wing opinion, it is notable that many of SocSoc's members, and some of its methods, were influenced by the New Left. Bob Heath was in his own words "product of the New Left", and had indeed been asked to become editor of the Universities and Left Review, a mouthpiece for the New Left, in 1956. In the late-1950s, Harry Barnes had himself been inspired to join the Labour Party by the teachings of left-wing intellectual G.D.H. Cole, who had also inspired Stuart Hall and other New Left undergraduates in Oxford in the mid-1950s. It is also notable that the New Left's critique of both Western and Soviet foreign policy, and its calls for an independent British foreign policy, had much traction amongst SocSoc members. The Society also operated a decentralised, facilitative structure instead of a top-down, insular executive – something of a key ideal of the New Left, and especially of the student movements that followed in the late-1950s.

=== The Hull Tribune Group ===
At the end of the 1950s, the Hull Tribune Group was in full swing, under the watching eye of John Saville, Peter Worsley, and others. They met weekly at the Haworth Arms, and among the speakers were

- Fenner Brockway
- Ralph Miliband
- E.P.Thompson
- Konni Zilliacus
- Sydney Silverman

=== The Hull University Socialist Society, c. 1958 – 1966 ===
The 1960s was something of a golden age for left-wing politics in Hull. Various factors – the strong city Labour Party; the influence of left-wing lecturers such as John Saville, Tony Topham, Axel Stern and Janet Blackman; and Hull University's links with Ruskin College, an institution for the education of (generally left-wing) working class adults at Oxford, which provided many students to fill SocSoc's ranks, such as future MPs John Prescott and Harry Barnes, and Bob Heath, SocSoc chair from 1962 to 1965 – gave Hull University a reputation in the press and amongst staff and students as the "reddest of the red bricks." Many left-wing prospective students minded to attend an institution which offered them opportunities for political activism, as well as the chance to pursue academia, were attracted to Hull University to study.

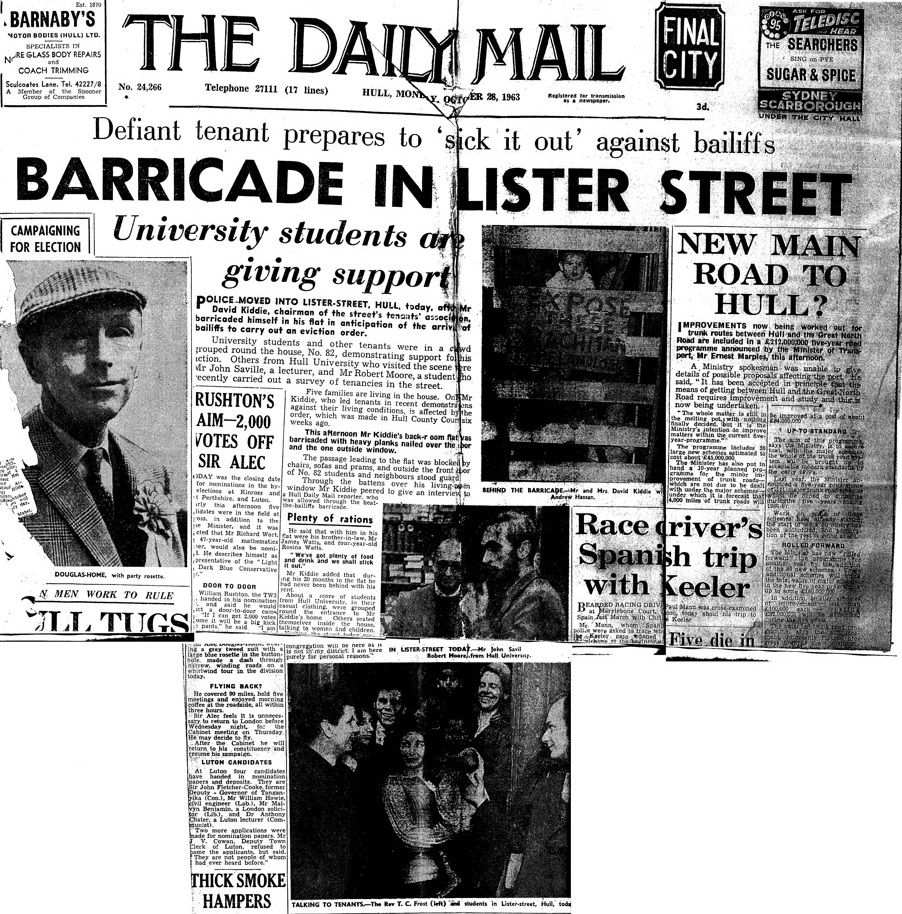
The Hull Daily Mail gave front-page coverage to the Lister Street tenants' rent strike in 1963. The Socialist Society – at the instigation of John Saville (pictured) – assisted tenants in the rent strike, and Sociology student and SocSoc member Robert Moore (also pictured) conducted a survey of rent levels in the area.

SocSoc campaigns in this era, at their height, galvanised the support of at least 10% of Hull University's student population (then 1700), and wherever possible members sought to build a broad coalition of supporters, of all shades of opinion. In 1962, SocSoc members led a march to the Hull City Hall calling for peace in the midst of the Cuban Missile Crisis. Some 200 other students, including Conservatives and devout Christians, joined them in the march, which achieved local newspaper coverage. In 1963, a small number of SocSoc members, amongst some others, were – at the clandestine instigation of John Saville – also involved in what was dubbed the "Battle of Lister Street" by students. Lister Street, owned by private sector landlords, was the site of some of Hull's worst slum housing, and in protest at the conditions in 1963, tenants had refused to pay the rents. Facing eviction from private landlords, some Hull students decided to support the tenants in resisting eviction. The campaign carried a front-page headline in the Hull Daily Mail titled "Barricade in Lister Street", and thus succeeded in its aim of drawing attention to the poor conditions of slum housing in Hull, which was often ignored by members of the Hull City Council. Although otherwise insignificant in Student Union affairs relative to the Hattersley/McNamara era, SocSoc did campaign to get the University Union to boycott South African products. When the Union refused to endorse SocSoc's motion for the boycott, they proceeded to put up a slate of a dozen candidates for the Union elections. Most of them got elected and the ban was implemented. In addition, they assisted the local Labour party, and David Whitely in the then rather influential Hull and East Riding Cooperative Society, to impose a ban. They also campaigned against the then Blackburn (now BAE) factory at Brough's manufacturing of Buccaneer bombers for sale to Apartheid South Africa. In 1964, when Harold Wilson was returned as Labour Prime Minister, he proceeded to stop all arms sales to South Africa.

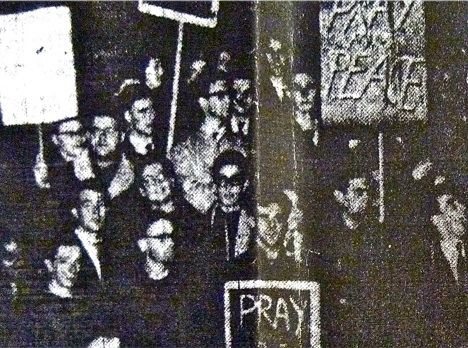
Hull students marching for peace during the Cuban Missile Crisis in Victoria Square on 24 October 1962. Organised by SocSoc, over 10% of Hull's student population, or approximately 200 students, participated in the protest.

Like in the 1950s, SocSoc continued to play a prominent role in NALSO, hosting a NALSO conference in Ferens Hall at Hull in 1962 and having some of its members elected to executive positions in NALSO, such as Colin Livett as Vice-Chair. Furthermore, in the 1962 NALSO conference, SocSoc students Colin Livett and Hedley Taylor moved perhaps the first ever NALSO motion on the decriminalisation of homosexuality.

Speakers hosted by SocSoc included a range of New Left figures, often thanks to the links of John Saville, to speak to the Society. Hugh Gaitskell, then Labour leader, also spoke to the club during a tour of Hull in 1962. Indeed, on 2 March 1962, J.T. Anson, the Labour Party's regional organiser, confided in Gaitskell in advance of his visit that,

"I think I should mention that this University Socialist Club is not a Labour Club in the strict sense of the term, but has within its ranks all those who believe in Socialism, no matter whether it is the CP or any other type. The son of Mr [Stephen] Swingler, MP, is an official of the Club and he, of course, is very much on the 'left.'"

=== The Rising Tide of New Left Student Radicalism and the SocSoc/Labour Club Split, 1967–1970 ===
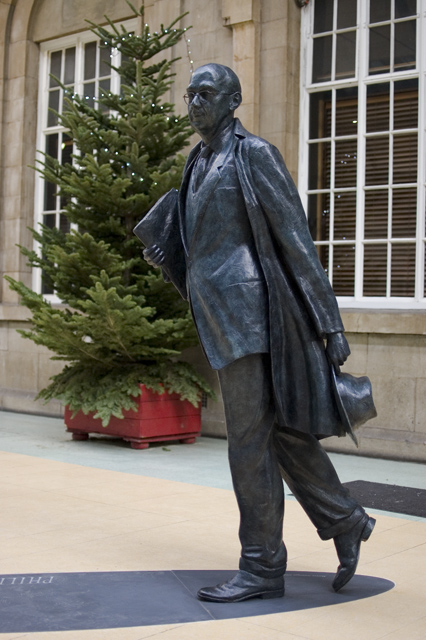
"When the Russians land at Dover, what defence for you and me? Colonel Sloman's Essex Rifles or the Light Horse at LSE?" – Philip Larkin, then Librarian of the University of Hull, on the student protests of 1968.

This golden era of cooperation ended in September 1967, when the Hull University Labour Club (HULC) broke away from an increasingly radicalised SocSoc. Disenchantment with Harold Wilson’s 1964–70 Labour government likely played a big role in the divisions. The first ever issue of its journal, "Comment", contained an article on homelessness.

=== Hull University Labour Club: 1971–1980 ===
The late-1960s and 1970s was an era of mass student revolt, and HULC played its part in this as part of what was by then a broader patchwork of left-wing student clubs in the Hull scene. HULC was especially prominent in campaigns against the university’s investments in Apartheid South Africa, most notably the campaign to have the university disinvest its shares from Barclays Bank and Reckitt and Coleman, due to their involvement in Apartheid. There was also a big campaign against the disparity in fees for overseas students. In 1978, HULC candidates Pete McCabe and David Hanson attained both the presidency and vice-presidency of HUU for the first time in the club’s history.

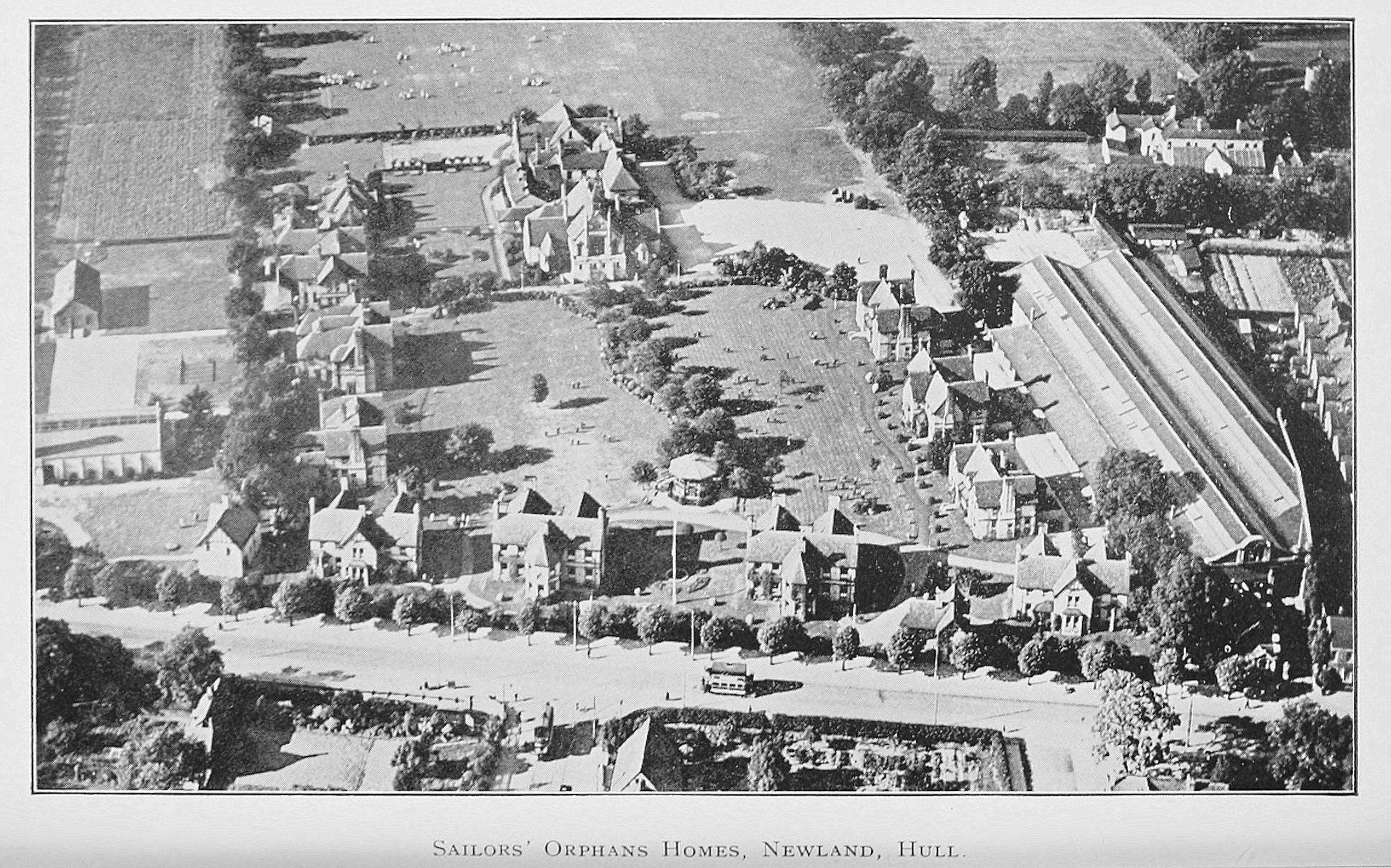
The Hull Sailor's Orphan's Home, Cottingham Road, Hull, set up to house the fatherless children of men lost at sea. Fishing was an especially demanding and dangerous job in the 1960s, with over two dozen sailors lost at sea in 1968 alone. These conditions, and the Wilson government's unwillingness to countanance better pay and conditions for Hull's seamen, were one of the things which spurred John Prescott to publish "Not Wanted on Voyage" highlighting the difficult work of Hull's trawlermen.

=== The Divided 1980s ===
HULC activities in the turbulent 1980s are a mystery, but it appears that during much of this period the club fell under the influence of the radical left: in 1984, a National Organisation of Labour Students (NOLS) Conference at Hull was called off due to militant unrest.

=== HULC's Revival of the 1990s ===
When the future MP Tom Watson and Rebecca Gray started their degrees at Hull in 1991, HULC was regarded as an insular irrelevance on campus and had experienced a bitter dispute over its nomination for the candidate of HUU president in the previous year. Within just a year, however, Watson and Gray, amongst others, turned HULC into a more significant, professional organisation attracting, at its height, some 230–250 members to its fold, a number perhaps surpassing any other Labour Club of any similarly-sized university at its time. Much like the old SocSoc, HULC built links with the community and increased its membership through a general tolerance of political difference.

=== Recent History ===
The society through the course of the 2000s continued to be a large and vocal club in Hull University. Its influence and campaigning ability is reflected in the large numbers of presidents and sabbatical officers within Hull University Union that have emerged from it, including Ed Marsh, Helen Gibson, Aidan Mersh and Victoria Winterton. The club has traditionally had at least one internal member elected to the Hull University Union sabbatical team until 2015 in that tradition came to an end. No internal member ran as a candidate in 2016.

Through this period though its relationship with Labour Students had become strained with some HULC members in 2011–2013 feeling that the body no longer effectively represented them. This inevitability led to HULC disaffiliating in early 2013 for three clear set out reasons:

1. The blocking of Hull University Labour Club’s motion on Internal Labour Students Policy.

2. The treatment of delegates at Labour Students Conference

3. Long-term issues with Labour Students. Here we list a few issues brought to the attention of the Hull University Labour Club executive committee: The problematic selection of NUS candidates, The cost of Labour Students events, The separation of the Student movement from the Youth movement, The undemocratic elections of the national executive committee, General cronyism, Exclusion of periphery groups (such as Hull) and General inaction and mismanagement.

At the time they were one of 11 University clubs to disaffiliate from the organisation leading to an internal review and the promise of a vote from the incoming president on one of the main aims of the disaffiliated club, the introduction of One Member One Vote elections as opposed to the delegate system that is currently in place. This protest was successful and led not only to the introduction of OMOV but also the re-affiliation of HULC to Labour Students in 2016.

The Club began to return to its roots as part of the student activist movement, with alumni starting to take further positions on the National Union of Students (although this trend ended following the decision of Hull University Union to disaffiliate from the NUS) and in Young Labour.

The Club faced difficulty in the 2020/21 academic year, with a multitude of issues bringing the society close to collapse. This was avoided however, with the society successfully being able to elect a new executive committee in April 2021, ensuring that they would continue to survive into the next year.

The Labour Club has hosted a range of prominent Labour speakers including Alan Johnson, Chris Bryant, John McDonnell, Tom Watson, Dennis Skinner, Owen Jones, and many others. It played a crucial role in campaigning for Kingston upon Hull North MP Diana Johnson in both 2010 and 2015, increasing her majority most recently by over 12,000 votes.

== Alumni ==
=== Peers, MPs and MEPs ===
In total, 23 Members of Parliament studied at Hull with 19 of them Labour. In addition, two Labour Members of European Parliament and three members of the House of Lords also studied at Hull. Three of the sixteen Deputy Leaders of the Labour Party are Hull alumni.

==== MPs ====
- Roy Hattersley (Birmingham Sparkbrook, 1964–1997, made a Life Peer for Sparkbrook before resigning in 2015)
- Kevin McNamara (Kingston upon Hull North, 1966–2005)
- Bob Cryer (Keighley, 1974–1983; Bradford South, 1987–1994)
- John Prescott (Hull East, 1970–2010, made a Life Peer for Hull in 2010)
- Millie Miller (Ilford North, 1974–1977)
- Frank Field (Birkenhead, 1979–2019)
- Harry Barnes (North East Derbyshire, 1987–2005)
- Elliot Morley (Scunthorpe, 1987–2010)
- Chris Mullin (Sunderland South, 1987–2010)
- Joan Walley (Stoke-on-Trent North, 1987–2015)
- David Hanson (Delyn, 1992–2019)
- Greg Pope (Hyndburn, 1992–2010)
- Jon Trickett (Hemsworth, 1996–present)
- Brian Iddon (Bolton South East, 1997–2010)
- Louise Ellman (Liverpool Riverside, 1997–2019)
- Rosie Winterton (Doncaster Central, 1997–present)
- Colin Challen (Morley and Rothwell, 2001–2010)
- Tom Watson (West Bromwich East, 2001–2019)
- Karl Turner (Hull East, 2010–present)
- Norman Godman (Labour politician) Port Glasgow from 1983–1997, and for Greenock and Inverclyde 1997–2001

==== Former MEPs ====
- Richard Corbett MEP, Yorkshire and the Humber. (1999–2009, 2014–2020)
- Eluned Morgan, Baroness Morgan of Ely, Wales, (1994–2009)

=== Councillors, Intellectuals and other Notable Figures ===
Other Labour-related Hull alumni include local politicians Bryn Davies, a former member of the Greater London Council and leader of the Inner London Education Authority (ILEA), Frances Morrell, who also led the ILEA and was a close friend of Tony Benn, and Doug Taylor, leader of Enfield Council and HULC Chair from 1979 until 1980.

An unknown number of Hull alumni have contested elections including Fred Moorhouse (Bath, 1964 and 1966), Mike Cowan (Ashfield, 1977) and former National Union of Students President Andrew Pakes (Milton Keynes North, 2010; Milton Keynes South, 2015).

Robin Swingler, son of the Labour MP Stephen Swingler and founding member of the Committee of 100 was an active member in the 1960s.

Anthony Giddens, a political philosopher associated with Third Way politics, graduated from Hull University.

Hull alumni who went on to become successful international politicians include Neeli Kroes, the Dutch politician currently serving as European Commissioner for competition; Joseph Garcia, leader of the Gibraltar Liberal Party; Malaysian MP Hohd Puad Zarkashi; Saint Lucian lawyer and politician Sarah Flood-Beauburn; Belgian politician and chair of their Groen! party Wouter Van Besien; Daniel Francis Annan, speaker of the Ghanaian Parliament from 1993 to 2001; Dominican politician Nicholas Liverpool; and Hong Kong Minister and founder of their now-defunct pro-democracy Citizens Party, Christine Loh.
