= Lucas Plan =

1976 document produced by Lucas Aerospace workers

The Lucas Plan was a January 1976 document produced by the workers of Lucas Aerospace Corporation, organized as the Combine. The shop stewards at Lucas Aerospace published an Alternative Plan for the future of their company. The plan was in response to the company’s announcement that thousands of jobs were to be cut to enable industrial restructuring in the face of technological change and international competition. Instead of being made redundant the workforce argued for their right to develop socially useful products. The plan was nominated for the Nobel Peace Prize in 1979.

The workers, including Ernie Scarbrow (Combine Secretary), Phil Asquith, Brian Salisbury, Mick Cooney, Danny Conroy, Mike Cooley, Ron Mills, Bob Dodd, John Routley and Terry Moran, argued that state support would be better used developing socially useful products and production than supplying military contracts.

To draw up the Plan, shop stewards consulted their members and built the Plan from the knowledge, skills and experience of the workforce. The resulting plan included over 150 designs for alternative products - including wind turbines, hybrid cars, heat pumps and energy efficient houses. Market analyses, economic arguments and training programmes were included in the Plan. The Plan also included outlines to re-organise the workforce into teams combining the workers' shop floor tacit knowledge with theoretical engineering from the designers. The plan was met with considerable hostility from the Lucas Aerospace management.

Mike Cooley was 'effectively' sacked from Lucas Aerospace in 1981. He later won the Right Livelihood Award for designing and promoting the theory and practice of human-centred, socially useful production.

== Revisiting of the Lucas Plan ==
John McDonnell MP, the then Shadow Chancellor of the Exchequer, spoke in February 2018 about the importance of the Lucas Plan. The event was "The Lucas Plan and the New Economics" meeting organised by The World Transformed (a four-day politics, arts and music festival running alongside the Labour Party Conference).

The Lucas Plan story and Lucas Combine archive can be found on the "New Lucas Plan" website.

== Film: The Plan (That Came from the Bottom Up) ==
Steve Sprung's film The Plan was launched at the BFI London Film Festival 2018 on 14 October that year. The film revisits the Lucas Plan, with many of the originators of the plan, from the Lucas Aerospace Combine Shop Stewards Committee, being interviewed, including Phil Asquith, Brian Salisbury, Mick Cooney, Ron Mills and Bob Dodd. The film explores the relevance of the plan today in the context of climate change. and worldwide unemployment.

== Publications related to the Lucas Plan ==
The list of publications below cover the history of the Lucas Plan, explore Socially Useful Production and explore the possibility of introducing more widely the concepts developed in the Plan.

- The Lucas Plan and Socially Useful Production, Spokesman Books.
- Hilary Wainwright & Dave Elliott, The Lucas Plan - A New Trade Unionism in the Making? (first published by Allison and Busby, 1981). Spokesman Books.
- Mike Cooley, Architect or Bee? The Human Price of Technology, Foreword by Frances O'Grady, Spokesman Books (2016) ISBN 978 0 85124 8493
- Löw-Beer, Peter: Industrie und Glück. Der Alternativplan von Lucas Aerospace. Mit e. Vorwort v. Mike Cooley u. e. Beitrag v. Alfred Sohn-Rethel: Produktionslogik gegen Aneignungslogik. Published by Berlin, Wagenbach, (1981).
- Original Footage "Lucas Aerospace Workers' Plan to diversify into socially useful products 1970s: A documentary", produced by Paul Lashmar, NELP 1978 Published on YouTube on 9 November 2018.

In "Architect or Bee?" Mike Cooley asserts: "The alternatives are stark. Either we will have a future in which human beings are reduced to a sort of bee-like behaviour, reacting to the systems and equipment specified for them; or we will have a future in which masses of people, conscious of their skills and abilities in both a political and a technical sense, decide that they are going to be the architects of a new form of technological development which will enhance human creativity and mean more freedom of choice and expression rather than less. The truth is, we shall have to make the profound decision as to whether we intend to act as architects or behave like bees.”

== The Mike Cooley Archive - Waterford Institute of Technology ==
The Waterford Institute of Technology, Luke Wadding Library acquired by donation from the Cooley Family the entire archive of Professor Mike Cooley. The collection includes over 1400 items including photographs, correspondences such as letters and postcards, journals, a wide range of books, drawings, cassette tapes, and slides. A large part of the archive is in relation to The Lucas Plan, and the various correspondences made between different parties about this in the 1970’s and includes photographs, letters (both typed and hand-written), newspaper articles, and posters.
