= Institute for Workers' Control =

The Institute for Workers' Control was founded in 1968 by Tony Topham and Ken Coates, the latter then a leader of the International Marxist Group and subsequently professor at the University of Nottingham and a member of the European Parliament from 1989 until 1999.

The Institute drew together shop stewards and militant workers to discuss workers' control of production. It grew out of the Workers' Control Conferences organised from 1964 by Voice of the Unions and the Centre for Socialist Education. From around 100 at the first meeting in Nottingham, the figure grew to some 1200 in 1969. The goals of the Institute were to "assist in the formation of workers control groups dedicated to the development of democratic consciousness, to the winning of support for workers control in all the existing organisations of Labour, to the challenging of undemocratic actions wherever they may occur, and to the extension of democratic control over industry and the economy itself".

The Institute won sponsorship from a number of trade union leaders, including Hugh Scanlon. In the later opinion of the International Marxist Group's journal, the Institute over-accommodated to its sponsors and failed to organise its supporters: "only 26 people attended the AGM in 1970, and affiliation and membership fees have been maintained at a very high level."

== Publications ==
- Peter Hain and Simon Hebditch (1978). Radicals and Socialism. Institute for Workers' Control. ISBN 978-0-901740-55-7.
- Peter Hain (1980). Reviving the Labour Party. Institute for Workers' Control. ISBN 978-0-901740-69-4.
