= International Marxist Group =

- Founders: Pat Jordan; Ken Coates
- Founded: 1961 International Group; 1967 International Marxist Group
- Dissolved: 1982
- Split from: Revolutionary Socialist League
- Succeeded by: International Socialist Group; Socialist Action
- Ideology: Trotskyism; Socialist feminism
- Political position: Far-left
- International affiliation: International Secretariat of the Fourth International (from 1969)

The International Marxist Group (IMG) was a Trotskyist political group in the United Kingdom that existed between 1961 and 1982.

Originally founded as the International Group in 1961, it renamed itself to the International Marxist Group in 1967 and published multiple newspapers including The Black Dwarf, and Red Mole which was replaced by Red Weekly in 1973, and then Socialist Challenge in 1977. In 1982, the group entered the Labour Party and became the Socialist League

The group was the British Section of the Fourth International. It had around 1,000 members and supporters in the late 1970s. In 1980, it had 682 members; by 1982, when it changed its name to the Socialist League, membership had fallen to 534.

== The International Group ==
The IMG emerged from the International Group, a sympathising organisation of the International Secretariat of the Fourth International (ISFI). Its founders, Pat Jordan and Ken Coates, had broken with the Communist Party of Great Britain (CPGB) in Nottingham in 1956. They were members of the Revolutionary Socialist League (RSL) in the late 1950s (which was later renamed Militant), Jordan becoming organising secretary.

In 1961, six individuals split from the RSL to form the Internationalist Group in support of the ISFI against the leadership of the RSL, its British section.

In 1962, the group encouraged involvement with the Campaign for Nuclear Disarmament, of which it continued to be active inside the organisation as late as 1986.

In 1963, the ISFI reunited with the majority of the International Committee of the Fourth International as the United Secretariat which advised the RSL and Internationalist Group to unite. A unity conference in September 1964, brokered partly by Pierre Frank and Jimmy Deane, voted for unity but the fusion was not accepted: RSL member Peter Taaffe recalls that he "led a walk-out of the Liverpool delegation, with the majority in Liverpool in support". Very soon the former Internationalist Group members left to form a new organisation, the International Group, together with some former members of the Socialist Labour League (SLL) who had opposed that organisation's refusal to take part in the 1963 reunification of the majorities of the Fourth International, including Charlie van Gelderen.

The 1965 World Congress of the International demoted the RSL to a "sympathising" group: the International Group was granted the same status. In the words of the RSL's Peter Taaffe, "We decided that the time had arrived when we must turn our backs on this organisation." The RSL left the FI, and ultimately became the Militant Tendency, or just Militant.

The group created the Vietnam Solidarity Campaign in 1966, and were firmly in control of its operations, but had support from members of the International Socialists.

The International Group continued the production of a cyclostyled bulletin known as The Week. As it was engaged in entryism inside the Labour Party, this journal gained various sponsors including Bertrand Russell, whose Russell Tribunal employed two members of the Canadian section of the FI seconded to the British section, Ernie Tate and Pat Brain.

== The International Marxist Group ==
In 1967, the International Group was renamed to the International Marxist Group (IMG).

The IMG's activists published International, which was launched in May 1968 with IMG secretary Pat Jordan as editor and incorporated The Week. It was published with varying formats and frequencies throughout the organisation's life. Socialist Woman magazine was published from 1969 to 1980.

The evolving orientations taken by the IMG were reflected in the sequence of newspapers it supported: The Black Dwarf; Red Mole; Red Weekly; Socialist Challenge; and Socialist Action.

=== The Black Dwarf ===
The Black Dwarf was launched in June 1968 under Tariq Ali's editorship, with several other IMG members on its editorial board. Its creative and pluralist nature attracted a number of new activists to the group: John Lennon was friendly to the organisation.

While IMG members largely remained in the Labour Party, including Charlie van Gelderen, International marked a break from 'deep entrism'. Its first issue claimed that "The Week was brought out in the expectation that a mass left would arise in the Labour party once labour was in power. [Its] main function was that of an organiser and co-ordinator [...] but this will be a by-product of the main function of International: the creation of a firm marxist core in the labour movement." Its campaigning was focussed on broader initiatives such as the Vietnam Solidarity Campaign and the Russell Tribunal, in which Ernie Tate was prominent and in which the RSL and Socialist Labour League did not work, the Institute for Workers' Control and the Revolutionary Socialist Students Front, in which Peter Gowan and Murray Smith were active. The agitational work of The Week was carried on in The Black Dwarf and in Socialist Woman, launched in 1969. The Group gained some public prominence when Tariq Ali, who had joined in April 1968, was widely publicised in the media as a leader of protests against the Vietnam War.

After the IMG became the British section of the Fourth International in May 1969, International started to be formally presented as the publication of the IMG. The group began to focus on work in the student movement and trade unions. It abandoned its earlier systematic entryist work within the Labour Party, although the IMG continuously operated a "fraction" to organise its members within the Party. This turn out from the party led to a small number of members, including Al Richardson, being marginalised: they went on to form the Revolutionary Communist League, better known as the Chartists.

The IMG was quickly noted for its energetic support for international solidarity campaigns concerning Vietnam, Cuba, Czechoslovakia, South Africa, and its support for socialists facing repression in France, Bolivia and Mexico, support for which was organised through the Black Dwarf. International's May 1969 famous headline "Permanent Revolution Reaches UK" reflected its support for armed self-defence against the British state's forces in Northern Ireland in the Red Weekly and in its propaganda activity. It also supported, in orthodox Trotskyist fashion, the Communist-influenced struggles of the MPLA in Angola, FRELIMO in Mozambique and the ANC in South Africa despite the complete contempt of the Communist parties for Trotskyists: some opponents nicknamed them 'MIGs', after the Soviet military MiG.

In domestic politics, the early 1970s saw the IMG completely reject parliamentary politics. In 1970, the group used the general election as an opportunity to make revolutionary propaganda rather than canvassing for the return of a Labour government.

=== Red Mole 1970-1973 ===
Red Mole supported the IRA's para-military campaign

In March 1970, The Black Dwarf's editorial board split over questions of Leninism, the felt lack of internal programmatic debate, especially around the support for anti-colonial revolutionary movements by the breakaway faction. A second newspaper was established, Red Mole, which Tariq Ali edited alongside an editorial board with an IMG majority. Red Mole was a "revolutionary internationalist" paper that carried a broad range of left-wing opinion in its pages, including a famous interview with John Lennon. Chenhanho Chimutengwende, a Zimbabwe exile who later served as a minister under Robert Mugabe, was one of the non-IMG members on the editorial board. IMG members also took part in New Left Review: Tariq Ali, Robin Blackburn, and Quintin Hoare were on its editorial board for much of the 1970s and subsequently.

Because Red Mole was used by the IMG as its main organ, articles were sometimes mistakenly thought to indicate the positions of the IMG. For example, there was confusion after Robin Blackburn had written an April 1970 article entitled "Let it bleed" for Red Mole, in which he argued that Marxists should disrupt the campaigns of the Labour and Conservative parties in the 1970 General Election. IMG secretary Pat Jordan replied a month later to explain why the IMG favoured a Labour victory. The group's general orientation at that time was summarised by Ali's book The Coming British Revolution (ISBN 0-224-00630-4).

By September 1970, Red Circles had been set up to organise activists who supported the paper. Many went on to join the IMG. The IMG radicalised as it grew: Pat Jordan's leadership gave way to that of John Ross, who anticipated that the rising tide of class struggle could lead to a pre-revolutionary crisis in Britain. In August 1972, the IMG formally assumed control of the Red Mole and prepared to relaunch it as a weekly newspaper.

In 1971, branch orders of Red Mole only returned 52-63% of expected revenue from sales.

The IMG strongly supported the IRA, adopting the slogan "Victory for the IRA". After the events of Bloody Sunday John Lennon and Yoko Ono attended a protest in London while displaying a Red Mole newspaper with the headline "For the IRA, Against British Imperialism".

=== Red Weekly 1973-1977 ===
In May 1973, the fortnightly Red Mole was replaced by Red Weekly. International's editors and editorial board included many of the organisation's leaders, including Tariq Ali, Patrick Camiller, Ann Clafferty, Gus Fagan, Peter Gowan, Quintin Hoare, Michelle Lee, Bob Pennington, John Ross, Tony Whelan and Judith White.

During the 1970s the organisation developed a number of fluid, competing factions and tendencies. The IMG's leadership included Alan Jones (John Ross), Brian Grogan, Bob Pennington, Brian Heron and others. A notable minority tendency included Pat Jordan, Tariq Ali, Phil Hearse and many of the IMG's supporters on the New Left Review editorial board. A smaller tendency supported the positions of the American Socialist Workers Party. Other tendencies included a small group that eventually left to join the Workers' Socialist League of Alan Thornett, and a Left Opposition Tendency, some of whose members left and formed a new group, the Revolutionary Marxist Current, which later joined Big Flame. The United Secretariat prepared theses on the situation in Britain and the tasks of the IMG in 1973, and again in 1976, to help orient the organisation. In 1974, its members started to publish South Asia Marxist Review.

The IMG came to the public attention in 1974 during Lord Justice Scarman's Public Judicial Inquiry into the violent disturbances known as the Red Lion Square disorders, which led to the death of Kevin Gately, a University of Warwick student who was not an IMG member. Scarman found that the IMG had made a "vicious, violent and unprovoked attack on the Police" who were guarding Conway Hall to try to prevent access to the hall by the National Front who had booked it for a meeting to protest against the Labour Government's decision to grant an amnesty to illegal immigrants. According to a BBC documentary, the IMG was the only socialist group to play a role in the squatting movement.

The IMG stood two candidates in the February 1974 United Kingdom general election, They stood candidates in Glasgow Queen's Park, Newham North East, and Sheffield Attercliffe. and also stood candidates in the October 1974 United Kingdom general election.

However, by the time of the 1976 USFI World Congress, internal disputes over Latin America were becoming more difficult to reconcile as divisions became entrenched between supporters of the International Majority Tendency, led by Ernest Mandel, and the Leninist Trotskyist Faction, which was led by the American Socialist Workers Party. Despite a 'truce' reflected by the establishment of Socialist Challenge, these divisions would result in the permanent splintering of the IMG's successor organisation, the Socialist League.

This vigorous internal life did not impede its growth among students and workers. The IMG's growth was reflected when it established Red Books as its publishing house and bookshop. By 1977, when the leadership team around Tariq Ali had started the organisation on the road towards Socialist Challenge, both International and Socialist Woman were well-produced quarterly journals. During this period, the small Marxist Worker group also joined the IMG.

=== Socialist Challenge 1977-1982 ===
In June 1977, Socialist Challenge replaced Red Weekly. It raised two slogans.

- Build a socialist opposition. The IMG's new leadership team was inspired by the success in France of a united slate of three Trotskyist organisations (the LCR, LO and OCI). It started to campaign for united electoral action in Britain, partly to confront the growth of the National Front. The IMG launched the Socialist Unity initiative for the 1979 general election, which Big Flame also supported. Socialist Unity stood ten candidates; its highest vote was 477 votes, for Tariq Ali in Southall.
- For a united revolutionary organisation. The IMG argued that the forces of the far left should unite in a single organisation. This partly reflected growing openness of the USFI to regroupment, but also addressed the growth of the far left. The IMG proposed unity to the International Socialists (who had unsuccessfully made a similar proposal to the IMG a decade earlier). The IS turned them down flat although the manner of the IMGs approach, which reportedly described the IS as a centrist grouping, may have some relation to this decision on the part of the IS leadership.

Around this time IMG members also published several issues of a magazine called Black Liberation and Socialism. By 1979 the IMG grew to its highpoint of 758 members in good standing, and a total of 1,000 supporters.

In 1979-1980, Socialist Challenge's branch orders returned between 53-78% of expected revenue. These losses would not be solved until 1984 when the Socialist League were able to recoup 82% of Socialist Action sales.

In 1980, Tony Benn's campaign led the IMG to increase its focus on the Labour Party. It developed a 'combination tactic' in which its fraction of members in the Labour Party was boosted. By 1981, the IMG-organised youth organisation called Revolution Youth, which organised its magazine Revolution, had entered the Labour Party Young Socialists in order to build it and win activists to the IMG's politics. The IMG was soon to send a second wave of members into the Labour Party, leading it to merge in 1982 with the League for Socialist Action, a small group of Fourth International supporters that had been engaged in entrism in the Labour party for at least five years.

Initially, IMG members in the Labour Party continued to sell Socialist Challenge. They used it to argue that the Bennite left needed to organise together with the trade union left. IMG members, often describing themselves as 'Socialist Challenge supporters', supported the formation of Bennite organisations such as Labour Briefing and the Labour Committee on Ireland.

In mid-1982 its central committee started to discuss whether to announce that the IMG was dissolved in order to better facilitate its entry.

== Socialist Action and the Socialist League ==
In December 1982, the IMG renamed itself the Socialist League, while continuing to refer to itself as the IMG in internal documents. The group had fully entered the Labour Party and in 1983 began publishing the Socialist Action newspaper, by which name the League was often known.

Despite initial successes, Socialist Action was established at a time when the Bennite movement had started to suffer defeats. In 1983, the group's membership fell to around 500. Different tendencies developed in the organisation over how to relate to the political evolution of figures like Ken Livingstone and Arthur Scargill. At the same time, the Socialist Workers Party in the US, which influenced many of the group's members, started to withdraw from the International. This opened up the most bitter internal political struggle in the group's history. Under the pressures of the defeat of the 1984–1985 miners' strike, the group fragmented into three organisations.

- The largest minority, Faction One, led by Phil Hearse, Dave Packer, Davy Jones, and Bob Pennington formed the International Group in 1985. The group left in 1986 due to criticism of John Ross's authoritarian and the group reorientating itself around individuals like Arthur Scargill, Tony Benn, and Ken Livingstone. It merged with the Socialist Group in 1987, to form the International Socialist Group and publish Socialist Outlook. The ISG was recognised as the British Section of the Fourth International at its world congress in 1995, later merging into Socialist Resistance.
- The remaining majority of the Socialist League consisted of two factions. The smaller faction was led by Ross, and this dominated the apparatus of the organisation, being the group supportive of Livingstone and Scargill. The evolution of this group is discussed under its own entry, Socialist Action (UK). It eventually stopped the production of Socialist Action and withdrew from the Fourth International.
- The third current was a faction led by Brian Grogan and Jonathan Silberman which supported the American Socialist Workers Party. According to New International 11, it was expelled from the Socialist League in January 1988, one week before a conference at which its platform would have had the majority. Those expelled went ahead with the scheduled conference, which Ross's tendency had cancelled, and founded the Communist League, which is part of the Pathfinder tendency.

== Pamphlets ==
Some of its many pamphlets are listed below.

- Leonora Lloyd, comp., Booklist for Women's Liberation (1970)
- Tony Whelan, The Credibility Gap: The Politics of the S.L.L. (1970)
- Capital: A Readable Introduction to Volume One (1971)
- Peter Hampton, The Industrial Relations Bill (1971)
- Peter Hampton, Unemployment (1971)
- Leonora Lloyd, Women Workers in Britain (1971)
- Ernest Mandel, The Leninist Theory of Organization (1971)
- Ernest Mandel, The Lessons of May 1968 (1971)
- The Struggle in Bengal and the Fourth International (1971)
- John Weal, The Post Office Workers v. the State (1971)
- Bob Purdie, Ireland Unfree (1972)
- Tariq Ali, There Is Only One Road to Socialism and Workers' Power: The Lessons of the Chilean Coup (1973)
- Nationalisation or Expropriation? (1973)
- Readings on "State Capitalism" (1973)
- Max Shachtman, Genesis of Trotskyism (1973)
- Jaya Vithana, Ceylon and the Healy School of Falsification (1973)
- Tariq Ali and Gerry Hedley, Chile (1974)
- Cyprus / Kibris (1974)
- Fascism (1974)
- The Market and the Multinationals (1975)
- Portugal, Spain (1975)
- Zambia (1975)
- Jim Atkinson, How the Labour Government Supports Apartheid (1976)
- Dave Bailey, The Socialist Challenge to Racism (1976)
- Fighting for Women's Rights (1977)
- Bob Pennington, Revolutionary Socialism (1977)
- The Politics of Militant (1977)
- Southern Africa in Crisis (1977)
- Phil Hearse, On Trotskyism and the Fourth International (1978)
- Geoff Bell, British Labour and Ireland, 1969-79 (1979)
- Grenada (1980)
- Solidarity with Solidarnosc (1981)
- From Rebellion to Revolution: A Strategy for Black Liberation (1982)
- Revolution in Central America and the Caribbean (1982)

Preceded by Revolutionary Socialist League	British Section of the Fourth International; 1965–1982	Succeeded by Socialist Action
