= The Spokesman =

The Spokesman is a British left-wing quarterly magazine. The magazine was founded in 1970 by the Nobel laureate Bertrand Russell, and was edited for 40 years by the British left-wing MEP Ken Coates, who died in 2010. After Coates' death, The Independent wrote that the journal was "still flourishing". The current editor is Tony Simpson.

It is published in Nottingham by the Bertrand Russell Peace Foundation. The Spokesman features independent journalism on peace and nuclear disarmament, human rights and civil liberties, and contemporary politics.

Contributors have included leading Western writers, journalists and intellectuals such as Robert Fisk, Noam Chomsky, Naomi Klein, John le Carré, Trevor Griffiths, Stuart Holland and Kurt Vonnegut.
