= Mike Cooley (engineer) =

Irish engineer and trade union leader (1934–2020)

- Born: Michael Joseph Edward Cooley; 23 March 1934; Tuam, Ireland
- Died: 4 September 2020 (aged 86); Slough, England
- Occupations: Engineer, trade unionist, and author
- Known for: Labour activism in the 1970s; The Lucas Plan; Peace activism; Human-centred Systems; Socially useful production; Greater London Enterprise Board
- Family: Graham Cooley
- Awards: Right Livelihood Award (1981)

Michael Joseph Edward Cooley (23 March 1934 – 4 September 2020) was an Irish-born engineer, writer and trade union leader, best known for his work on the social effects of technology, "Socially Useful Production" and "Human Centred Systems". He was involved in workplace activism at the British company Lucas Aerospace in the late 1970s. In 1981, he was a recipient of the Right Livelihood Award for "designing and promoting the theory and practice of human-centred, socially useful production."

Cooley held several leadership positions in the field of computer-aided design (CAD) and was an advisor on numerous public and private sector projects. He was the founding president of the International Research Institute in Human Centred Systems (IRIHCS) and the international Journal AI & Society, and founding director of the Greater London Enterprise Board. He published over 100 scientific papers and fifteen books, and was a guest lecturer at universities in Europe, Australia, the US and Japan. His book Architect or Bee? has been translated into six languages.

== Biography ==
Michael Joseph Edward Cooley was born on 23 March 1934 in Tuam, Ireland, where he attended the Christian Brothers School and was classmates with the playwright Tom Murphy and the trade unionist Mick Brennan. Upon leaving school he was an apprentice at the Tuam Sugar Factory, where he worked as a welder and fitter. He began learning German in his spare time under the auspices of a Viennese colleague's wife, and in the mid-1950s moved to Germany to study mechanical engineering at the University of Bremen. Following a period working for the engineering firm Maschinenfabrik Oerlikon in Zurich, in 1957 Cooley arrived in London, where he worked for the aeronautics manufacturer de Havilland before joining Lucas Aerospace as a design engineer in 1962. He later gained a PhD in computer-aided design at the North East London Polytechnic (now the University of East London), and was a visiting professor at the University of Manchester Institute of Science and Technology (UMIST).

Cooley married Shirley Pullen in 1961, with whom he had two children. He died on 4 September 2020 in Slough, Berkshire, aged 86.

== Work life ==
=== The Lucas Plan ===
In the late 1970s, Mike Cooley was a senior designer at Lucas Aerospace, and chaired the local branch of the technical trade union Technical, Administrative and Supervisory Section (TASS). He was one of the militant activists behind The Lucas Plan, a radical strategy to avoid workforce layoffs by converting production at Lucas from armaments to civilian products. The plan was nominated for the Nobel Peace Prize in 1979.

The plan's aim was to replace weapons manufacture with the development of socially useful goods, like solar heating equipment, artificial kidneys, and systems for intermodal transportation. The goal was to not simply retain jobs, but to design the work so that the workers would be motivated by the social value of their activities. As Cooley put it "the workers are the experts”. The proposals of the alternative plan were not accepted by Lucas management and Cooley was 'effectively' dismissed in 1981, allegedly for spending excessive time upon union business and "concerns of society as a whole". After leaving Lucas he was appointed Technology Director of the Greater London Council.

=== Greater London Enterprise Board (GLEB): 1982 ===
Ken Livingstone and Mike Cooley founded the Greater London Enterprise Board (GLEB) in 1982, which was an industrial development and job creation agency set up by the GLC to create employment by investing in the industrial regeneration of London, with the funds provided by the council, its workers' pension fund and the financial markets. During the first two years of the enterprise board's existence the Greater London council provided a total annual budget of around £30 million, made up of some £20 million section 137 funds and £10 million section 3 mortgage loan facilities. Frank Dobson in Hansard wrote in 1985 when GLEB was under threat of closure, "The Government are not worried because the GLEB has been a failure; they are worried because it has been a success".

The GLEB became independent in 1986 when the GLC was abolished; it changed its name to Greater London Enterprise (GLE) and funded its activities from its income.

=== AI & Society (Founding Chairman): 1987 ===
Mike Cooley was the founding chairman of AI & Society, an international forum for socially responsible technology founded in 1987 that focuses on ‘societal issues".(Springer, 2018).

== Publications ==
=== Architect or Bee: 1980 ===
In 1980, Cooley published Architect or Bee? a critique of the automation and computerisation of engineering work. The book alludes to a comparison made by Karl Marx on the creative achievements of human imagination. According to Orlando Hill, "Mike Cooley’s Architect or Bee? put the case that a new organisation of technology could provide social good rather than profit". He goes on to say: "Cooley argues that if we are going to move from merrily producing commodities to producing goods that people need and want, we must change our attitude towards technology. The technology used today evolved from the concept of the division of labour. In a capitalist system in which the maximization of profit is the sole objective and people are regarded as units of labour-power, the division of labour and fragmentation of skills is absolutely rational and scientific. However, the consequence is the deskilling of workers and alienation from reality. A division between theory and practice is created with a bias towards theoretical knowledge. The skill and practical knowledge of the worker is despised."

Cooley's work on human-centred systems and socially useful production was compiled and first published by Shirley Cooley, Mike's wife, in 1980 (Hand & Brain publications); the second edition was published in the US in 1982 by South End Press with an introduction from MIT Professor David Noble and was followed by a new edition published by Hogarth Press in 1987 with an introduction by Anthony Barnett. The current edition was published by Spokesman Books in 2016 and has an introduction by Frances O’Grady the General Secretary of the TUC. The book has been translated into over 20 languages including Finnish, Irish and Chinese.

In Architect or Bee?, Cooley coined the term "human-centred systems" in the context of the transition in his profession from traditional drafting at a drawing board to computer-aided design. Human-centred systems, as used in economics, computing and design, aim to preserve or enhance human skills, in both manual and office work, in environments in which technology tends to undermine the skills that people use in their work.

=== Delinquent Genius: The Strange Affair of Man and His Technology : 1992 (Published 2018) ===
Cooley's book Delinquent Genius: The Strange Affair of Man and His Technology (1992; published 2018) explores the relationship between mankind and technology development. The book analyses the social impact of technology and the dangers of accepting the "one best" scientific idea of progress. According to Adrian Smith, Professor of Technology & Society at the University of Sussex, Cooley looks at "vantage points for realising neglected human purposes – such as creative work and environmental sustainability – through technology." Smith said its chapters "look upon a period of intense restructuring in the industrial manufacturing landscape, whose effects are still felt today".

=== List of books ===
- Cooley, Mike (1982). Architect or Bee? The human/technology relationship. Boston: South End Press. ISBN 978-0-89608-131-4.
- Cooley, Mike (1987). Architect or Bee? The human price of technology. UK: Hogarth Press. ISBN 0-7012-0769-8.
- Cooley, Mike (1988). Produkte für das Leben statt Waffen für den Tod. Germany: Rowohlt Verlag. ISBN 9783499148309.
- Cooley, Mike (2016). Architect or Bee? The Human Price of Technology. UK: Spokesman Books. ISBN 978-0-85124-8493.
- Cooley, Mike (2018). Delinquent Genius: The Strange Affair of Man and His Technology. UK: Spokesman Books. ISBN 978-085124-878-3.
- Cooley, Mike (2020). The Search for Alternatives, Liberating Human Imagination: A Mike Cooley Reader. UK: Spokesman Books. ISBN 978-085124-8851.

== Film, radio and television ==
In 1983 Cooley appeared in Farewell to Work? produced for Channel 4 by Udi Eichler of Brook Productions. Other participants included André Gorz, Patrick Minford and Claus Offe, and the discussion was chaired by Robert Hutchison. According to the film, technology would "virtually eliminate the manual working class by the end of the century" and displace jobs permanently. Gorz proposes working towards a future in which free time is sustained by a guaranteed minimum income and that production should be confined to essential goods and that people should pursue satisfying and autonomous activities.

Cooley appears in German filmmaker Harun Farocki's film Wie Man Sieht (As You See, 1983), which examines the emergence of computerization and its effects on military and managerial uses of innovative technology.

Cooley's work was the subject of the TV documentary Look, No Hands! in 1988 made for the Channel 4 documentary series Equinox. Directed by Christopher Rawlence and produced by Debra Hauer. The film was shown as part of season 1988, Episode 12, on Oct 9, 1988 and also produced as a VHS video.

In 1997, Cooley appeared in My Education by John Quinn, an RTE radio series and book published by Town House. The book is a set of interviews with educationalists discussing their own education and includes Mike Cooley, Noam Chomsky, Seamus Heaney and Charles Handy among others. Cooley and Quinn also collaborated on Education for the 1990s: Three Lectures Given at a Symposium in Radio Telefís Éireann, October 1989.

Cooley appeared in the 2003 Alan Gilsenan documentary Sing on Forever about the Irish playwright Tom Murphy, recalling his friendship with Murphy in Tuam.

== Awards ==
Cooley was awarded the Right Livelihood Award in 1981 for "designing and promoting the theory and practice of human-centred, socially useful production". In his acceptance speech, Cooley said, "Science and technology is not given. It was made by people like us. If it's not doing for us what we want, we have a right and a responsibility to change it."

== The Mike Cooley Archive ==
The Waterford Institute of Technology Luke Wadding Library acquired Mike Cooley's archive by donation from the Cooley family. The archive includes over 1,400 items including photographs, correspondences, journals, books, drawings, videos, cassette tapes, and slides A large part of the archive is related to the Lucas Plan.

The INSYTE-Cooley Research Lab was established in 2021 at South East Technological University (SETU), Waterford, following the donation of Professor Mike Cooley's personal archive in 2017.

In 2025, the inaugural Professor Mike Cooley Award was introduced by the university to honour individuals contributing to the preservation and dissemination of Cooley's work. In 2026, the award was presented to the former President of Ireland, Michael D. Higgins, at the university's Waterford campus in recognition of his advocacy for human-centred technology.
