= HULC (gene) =

Identifiers
- Aliases: HULC, HCCAT1, LINC00078, NCRNA00078, hepatocellular carcinoma up-regulated long non-coding RNA
- External IDs: OMIM: 612210; GeneCards: HULC
Orthologs
Databases	NCBI: entry; OMA: entry
Species	Human	Mouse
Entrez	728655	n/a
Ensembl	ENSG00000251164; ENSG00000276019	n/a
UniProt	n a	n/a
RefSeq (mRNA)	n/a	n/a
RefSeq (protein)	n/a	n/a
Location (UCSC)	n/a	n/a
PubMed search		n/a
- Wikidata
View/Edit Human

In molecular biology, Highly Up-regulated in Liver Cancer (non-protein coding), also known as HULC, is a long non-coding RNA. It was first identified in hepatocellular carcinoma, and is also expressed in colorectal carcinomas that metastasise to the liver. It may have a role in the post-transcriptional regulation of gene expression. It downregulates the expression of several microRNAs, including miR-372. Expression of HULC is upregulated by CREB, there is a CREB-binding site in the promoter of HULC. miR-372 represses translation of the kinase PRKACB, so downregulation of miR-372 leads to increased levels of PRKACB. PRKACB activates CREB by phosphorylation, therefore leading to increased expression of HULC.

== See also ==
- Long noncoding RNA
