= Michael Gallagher (British politician) =

British politician and miner

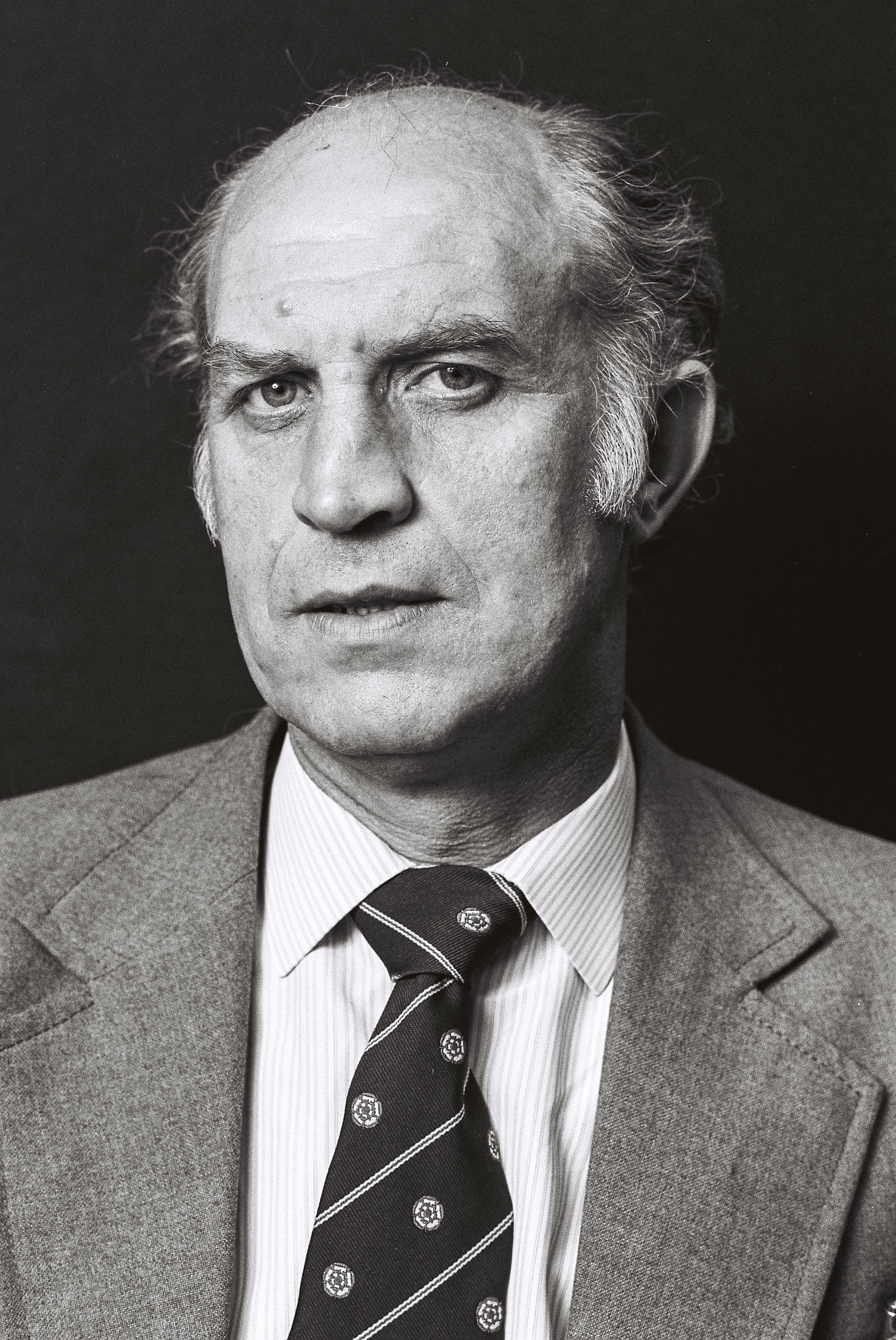
European Parliament portrait

Michael Gallagher (1 July 1934 – 10 June 2015) was a British miner, politician and software development company executive. He was the only Member of the European Parliament to have been a member of the original Social Democratic Party, when he left the Labour Party in 1984.

== Mining career ==
Gallagher was born in Seaham in the mining area of County Durham, and attended St Mary Magdalene Junior School and St Joseph's Secondary Modern School in the town. He himself became a miner on leaving school; he was employed in the Nottinghamshire coalfield.

== Education ==
He was a member of the National Union of Mineworkers and was a Branch Official of the Union from 1967 to 1970. Through the auspices of the Union he went on a day release course at the University of Nottingham from 1967 to 1969. He then obtained a Trades Union Congress scholarship to the University of Wales from 1970 to 1972 and to the University of Nottingham (Workers Educational Association section) from 1972 to 1974.

== Politics ==
Active in the Labour Party, in 1970 Gallagher was elected to Mansfield Borough Council, and in 1973 to Nottinghamshire County Council. He fought Rushcliffe at the February 1974 general election. As a supporter of British membership of the European Communities, Gallagher became interested in membership of the European Parliament at the first direct elections; he was sponsored by the NUM and in the 1979 elections he was elected as Labour MEP for Nottingham with a very small majority.

== European Parliament ==
He used his position at the European Parliament to call for more development of the mining industry. However, the change of policy of the Labour Party in the early 1980s led to his increasing disillusionment with the state of politics. In December 1983 Gallagher resigned from the Labour Party, and on 5 January 1984 he joined the Social Democratic Party. He described the Labour group of MEPs at the time as "really two groups of people who don't see eye to eye on anything".

The Nottingham constituency was subject to boundary changes at the 1984 elections, and Gallagher chose to abandon it and seek re-election as an SDP candidate in Lancashire Central. This was not a target seat for the SDP and Gallagher came third in the poll.

== Subsequent career ==
Gallagher then went into business. He was a Director of Simple Solutions 4 U, a business management and website marketing company based in the East Midlands.

He died in June 2015, aged 80.
