= Hull University Union =

Students' union for the University of Hull in England

Hull University Students' Union
- Institution: University of Hull
- Location: Kingston upon Hull, England
- Website: Hull University Students' Union website

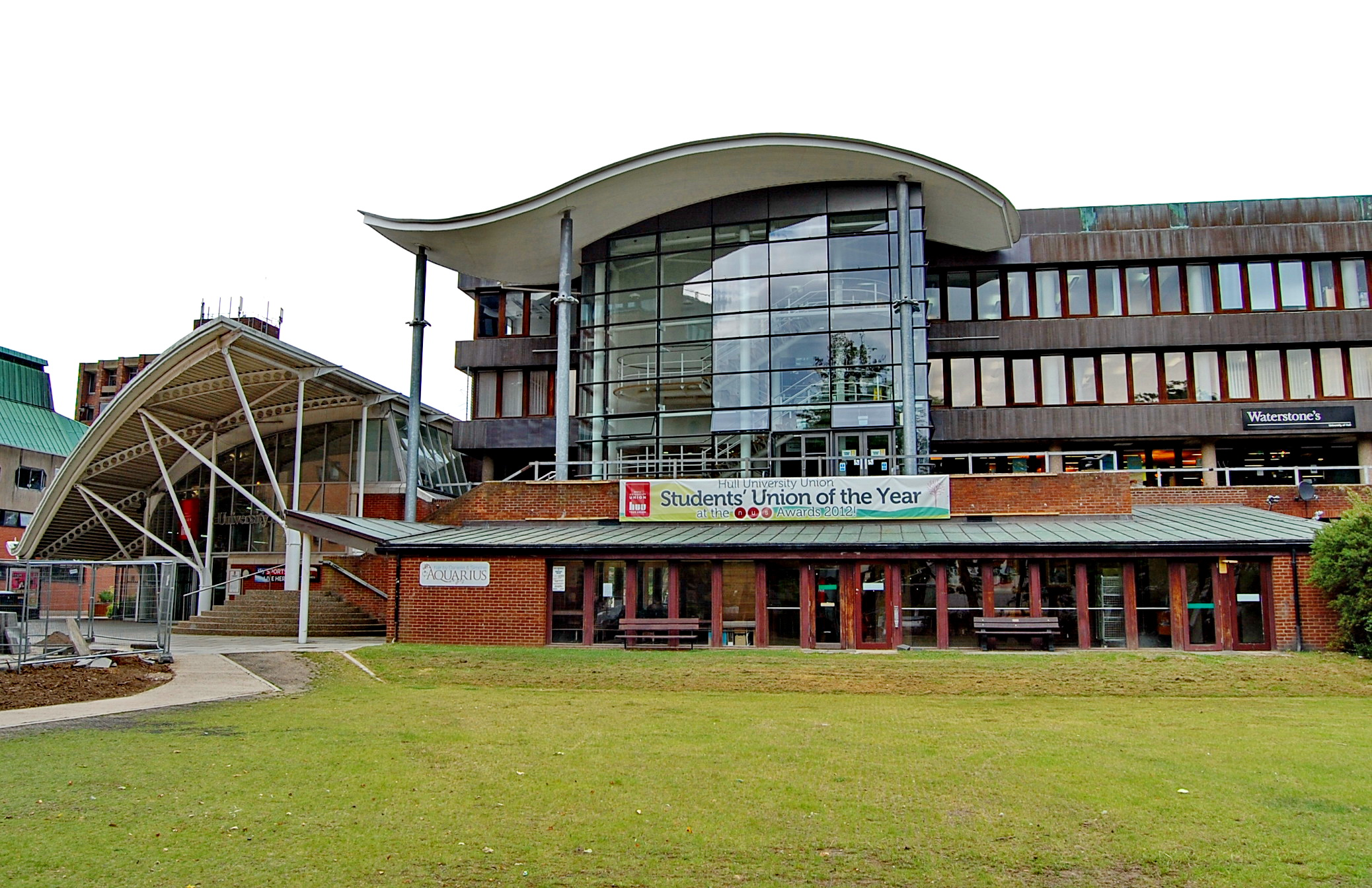
Hull University Students' Union

Hull University Students' Union (HUSU) is the students' union for the University of Hull in Kingston upon Hull, England. It is run as a completely separate entity to the university itself but enjoys a close working partnership with the University of Hull. There is a Union Executive Committee (UEC) chaired by one of the Presidents, which consists of four full-time Student Presidents, and the Chief Executive as an advisor to the Sabbatical Officers.

Union Council is the major scrutinizing body of Hull University Students' Union, meeting every month to scrutinize the decisions of the UEC.

On Tuesday 24 May 2016, Hull University Students' Union announced its intention to disaffiliate from the National Union of Students following a referendum where 811 students voted to leave against 476 to stay.

== Structure of the Union Executive Committee ==
HUSU is a registered charity and the supervisory body is the Charities Commission.

Some changes have already come into effect, for example, the trustee structure has already changed. There are now four student trustees, four external trustees and all five Student Presidents are also trustees.

The Union Executive Committee structure changed as of 29 June 2010. There will be five full-time Student Presidents. The new UEC is (* denotes trustee of Hull University Students' Union)

There are currently four full-time Student President positions within HUSU, President of Union Development, President of Opportunities, President of Inclusivity & Diversity and President of Education. Each president is supported by a body of student part-time officers that fall into 4 zones; Union Development, Opportunities, Inclusivity & Diversity and Education.

=== Regulations ===
Like any student union, there are regulations governing the way it runs. The biggest recent issue regarding these was the change of the union's constitution so it complies with the Charities Act – a bill which expected to have royal assent either this year or the next. The new constitution came into force on 1 August 2007. Alongside the constitution, there are also Bye-Laws, Standing Orders and Policies & Procedures. The Bye-Laws and Standing Orders are also going through a period of change.

For the likes of Standing Orders and other regulations, they must first pass through the Union Executive Committee (a regular meeting of all sabbatical officers) and then be discussed and/or ratified by Union Council. In the case of the constitution, it has to also go through University Senate and finally University Council.

== Entertainments ==
HUSU provides a variety of events for all groups of people. One of the biggest events is the End of Year Ball. HUSU also holds other regular events such as AU night, Tower on Wednesdays, and live music performances.

=== Asylum ===
HUSU is one of the few student unions in the country to have its own nightclub, Asylum, and is the Union's £3.6 million purpose-built centre of entertainment. It holds events and tours that are also open to the public. Asylum was voted the best student venue by HullVibe.

=== Bars ===
The Sanctuary Bar holds a Karaoke and quiz night and has outdoor seating. In 2022 Hull University Students' Union entered into a partnership with JD Wetherspoon to create the first campus Wetherspoons of its kind in a licensing deal in which the students union own and operate the bar and nightclub under the Wetherspoon brand.

== The Athletic Union (A.U.) ==
The Athletic Union is a large part of HUSU, which has roughly 50 sports clubs to which students can add by creating their own. It has its own executive committee, the president of which is also a President in the Union as the VP Sports & Leisure, and several of the teams compete in the National BUCS (formally BUSA) leagues. HUSU is one of the few unions in the country to provide the sport – it is common for universities to offer it instead. There are recently created 3G football pitches, astroturf (known as Fort Inglemire) for hockey, two large sports halls, six squash courts which have been renovated in 2013 as it hosts an international tournament later in 2013 and a state of the art Sports Science facility. There is also a gym which has received heavy investment over the years and can cater for all students' needs.

=== Hull University Swimming Club cheating scandal ===
In 2018, it was discovered that Hull University Swimming Club had cheated at the A.U.'s annual varsity competition with Lincoln by entering ineligible swimmers. The team was made to forfeit the competition, after complaints were made to HUSU about participants that were not students at the university.

== Scarborough campus ==
Hull University also had a campus in Scarborough until 2017, which was part of Hull University Union. The Union building was on the ground floor of the Scarborough Campus.

HUUSC was run by an executive team, chaired by the VP Scarborough Campus, who was part of the HUSU Union Executive Committee (UEC). This "exec", as it was known, was made up of five part-time volunteer student officers who were elected in week 5 of semester 2, alongside sabbatical officers. The roles were Scarborough Education Officer, Scarborough Sports Officer, Scarborough Welfare Officer, Scarborough Community Officer and Scarborough Campaigns Officer.

Each officer was responsible for a particular area of the Students' Union in Scarborough, and worked alongside their sabbatical colleagues from the Hull Campus to ensure that Scarborough Campus students had access to the same facilities, services and opportunities as their Hull-based counterparts.

BassMent! Radio, Scarborough Campus's radio station, was a joint venture operated by HUUSC and Hull University's Creative Music Technology Department, housed across the road from the campus in the "Filey Road Studios" building.

The student magazine, Scarborough Tide, was run by students and edited by the Scarborough Tide Editor. Responsibility for the Scarborough Tide lay ultimately on the shoulders of VP Scarborough as Editor in Chief.

== Volunteering in HUSU ==
There are many areas that students of Hull University can get involved in. Each area has its own Student President or part-time UEO. The responsibilities of the officers of these areas and student opportunities are mentioned below.

=== Academic Representation ===
The current set of responsibilities that the President, Education has are mainly the recruiting and guidance of:

- Student Reps (of which there are over 450)
- The Postgraduate Society
- The Mature Students Committee.
- Part-time Student Committee

This Student President also attends a large number of university committees so that the student voice can be heard. One of those committees is University Senate (one of the top committees in the University), of which, as well the President, Education, the President of Union Development, the VP Scarborough and VP Welfare and 6 elected Faculty Student Representatives and the Chair of the ISA attend to represent the Students to the top staff members of the university.

Recent developments in this area include activities related to PDP, IT, the National Student Survey, improving representation on the Scarborough campus, mature students and eLearning.

In the past, this position was known as "VP Education and Representation" and "VP Education & Welfare". The Welfare responsibilities eventually separated from this role to become VP Welfare Support Services and later on, VP Welfare & Equality.

=== Media ===
The Student President in charge of this area is responsible for:

- JAM Radio – The union-run student radio station broadcasts over the internet on from Hull University Students' Union's website. It is a standing committee in the union and mixes mainstream shows with a large selection of specialist shows.
- The Hullfire – In the past, The Hullfire has been in both magazine and newspaper form and is currently in the latter. Until 2007–2008 the VP Media & Communications was the Editor-In-Chief, however, due to increased responsibilities of the VP M&V, the editorial role has been taken over by an elected student volunteer along with a team of student sub-editors. The newspaper can now boast a circulation of 2000 per month and is generally considered to have improved year-on-year, most notably in 2012/13 after a major overhaul which was focused towards a higher quality of article and a more rounded presentation.

=== Welfare ===
The Student President in charge of this area is responsible for the Advice Centre, Job shop, LINKS (An operational unit of St John Ambulance), LGBT+ Committee, the Women's Officer, BAME Officer and Students with Disabilities officer.

VP Welfare also attends meetings of 'The Scheme' exec. The Scheme is a student accommodation setup in Hull to regulate landlords. However, the Union has recently noted that it will withdraw from 'The Scheme.'

This set of responsibilities used to be part of the role 'VP Education & Welfare' – a position seen in many student unions. However, due to the size of the remit, it split into two sabbatical positions several years ago (the other being VP Education).

=== HUSSO ===
Hull University Social Services Organisation/Student Community Action, often shortened to HUSSO, was formerly a registered charity in its own right. However, HUSSO is now a part of the HUU charity in the Community zone. It allows students to participate in a variety of activities which benefit the wider community (kids, older people, people with disabilities). Currently, there are over 200 volunteers involved in HUSSO. The Chair of HUSSO was formerly a part-time member of the Union Executive Committee but now is part of the Community Zone.

=== Community volunteering ===
CV is a referral service for students wishing to volunteer for external community projects (unlike HUSSO where the projects are student-led). There is a wide range of projects available and CV will offer support and advice to all volunteers using its services throughout their volunteering. CV is based in the Union on both Hull and Scarborough campuses.

=== Awards ===
In March 2011 the union was re-audited by the Student Union Evaluation Initiative after receiving a silver in 2008. In June 2011 it was announced that HUU had become the third student union to be awarded a Gold award in the UK, joining Sheffield and Leeds. Shortly after this Bath were also awarded Gold.

In May 2012 the Union was shortlisted for NUS HE innovative student engagement award at the NUS HE awards held in Nottingham and received the award for its work in using innovative techniques to engage traditionally hard to reach groups, techniques based upon monitoring of online memberships and online ticket purchases.

In July 2012 the Union was shortlisted for two NUS awards, the Community Relations Award and the Higher Education Student Union of the Year Award for the community work, academic wins such as the refurbishment of the library and the successful campaigns for changes to the Access Agreement and the continuation of lifelong learning. The Union received both awards at the awards night on 4 July at Exeter university.

== See also ==
- Jam 1575
- National Union of Students of the United Kingdom
