= Bertrand Russell Peace Foundation =

Peace, social justice, and human rights nonprofit

The Bertrand Russell Peace Foundation, established in 1963, continues the work of the philosopher and activist Bertrand Russell in the areas of peace, social justice, and human rights, with a specific focus on the dangers of nuclear war. Ken Coates was its director. Ralph Schoenman was its general secretary until 1969.

Spokesman Books is the publishing imprint of the Bertrand Russell Peace Foundation, and publishes books on politics, peace and disarmament, and history. It is based in Nottingham. The Spokesman is the journal of the Bertrand Russell Peace Foundation, which reached its 100th issue in August 2008.

== Publications ==
- Ken Coates and Tony Topham, Participation or Control? (1967)
- Jo O'Brien, Women's Liberation in Labour History (1972)
- After the Chilean Coup (1973)
- Salvador Allende, Chile: No More Dependence! (1973)
- CIA: The Pike Report (1977)
- Ken Coates, Democracy in the Labour Party (1977)
- Ken Coates and Tony Topham, The Shop Steward's Guide to the Bullock Report (1977)
- Peter Jenkins, Where Trotskyism Got Lost (1977)
- Alan Roberts and Zhores Medvedev, Hazards of Nuclear Power (1977)
- Brian Sedgemore, The How and Why of Socialism (1977), ISBN 0851241964
- Michael Barratt Brown et al., ed., Full Employment (1978)
- Berufsverbote Condemned (1978)
- Trident - Nuclear Proliferation the British Way (2008)
- Obama's Afghan Dilemma (2008)
- Democracy Old and New (2008)
- Tskhinvali: Shock and Awe (2008). ISBN 9780851247571. Edited by Ken Coates, with contributions from Gareth Peirce, Moazzam Begg, Vladimir Putin, Mahmoud Darwish, Saifedean Ammous, Stephen F. Cohen, Andrew Mackinlay MP, Mahmoud Darwish, Jean Ziegler, James Petras, Mike Cooley, Trevor Griffiths and Ann Talbot.
- Mike Cooley, 'Architect or Bee? The Human Price of Technology', Foreword by Frances O'Grady (2017)
- Mike Cooley, 'Delinquent Genius: The Strange Affair of Man and His Technology' Foreword by Michael D. Higgins. ISBN 978 085124 878 3 (2018).
- Mike Cooley, 'The Search for Alternatives, Liberating Human Imagination: A Mike Cooley Reader. ISBN 978-085124-8851 (2020)

In the Spokesman Pamphlets series there are 94 titles as of 2000.

== See also ==
- Russell Tribunal, for activities of Bertrand Russell Peace Foundation during Vietnam War
