= Nottingham (European Parliament constituency) =

Former European Parliament constituency

- European Parliament constituency
- Boundary within the East Midlands (1979-1984)
- Member state: United Kingdom
- Created: 1979
- Dissolved: 1994
- MEPs: 1

Prior to its uniform adoption of proportional representation in 1999, the United Kingdom used first-past-the-post for the European elections in England, Scotland and Wales. The European Parliament constituencies used under that system were smaller than the later regional constituencies and only had one Member of the European Parliament each, of which the constituency of Nottingham was one.

Boundary within the East Midlands (1984-1994)

== Boundaries ==
1979-1984: Ashfield; Bassetlaw; Beeston; Mansfield; Nottingham East; Nottingham North; Nottingham West.

1984-1994: Broxtowe; Gedling; Mansfield; Nottingham East; Nottingham North; Nottingham South; Rushcliffe; Sherwood.

== MEPs ==
Elected	Member	Party
1979	Michael Gallagher	Labour
1984	Michael Gallagher	SDP
1984	Michael Kilby	Conservative
1989	Ken Coates	Labour
1994	Constituency abolished	

== Election results ==
European Parliament election, 1979: Nottingham
Party	Candidate	Votes	%	±%
Labour	Michael Gallagher	66,279	45.9	
Conservative	J. D. Taylor	64,728	44.8	
Liberal	D. J. Chambers	13,515	9.3	
Majority		1,551	1.1	
Turnout		144,522	28.6	
Labour win (new seat)				

European Parliament election, 1984: Nottingham
Party	Candidate	Votes	%	±%
Conservative	Michael Kilby	82,500	45.3	+0.5
Labour	Ken Coates	66,374	36.5	−9.4
Liberal	Keith M. Melton	33,169	18.2	+8.9
Majority		16,126	8.8	N/A
Turnout		182,043	32.8	
Conservative gain from Labour		Swing		

European Parliament election, 1989: Nottingham
Party	Candidate	Votes	%	±%
Labour	Ken Coates	92,261	43.7	+7.2
Conservative	Michael Kilby	77,748	36.9	−8.4
Green	Mrs. Sue E. Blount	34,097	16.2	New
SLD	Andrew J. Swift	6,693	3.2	−15.0
Majority		14,513	6.8	N/A
Turnout		182,043	32.8	0.0
Labour gain from Conservative		Swing		
