= Pat Jordan =

British Trotskyist

Pat Jordan (17 July 1928 – 1 September 2001) was a British Trotskyist who was central to founding the International Marxist Group.

Jordan was born in Chelsea, London, the son of an electrical engineer. On 21 October 1950 he married Leonora May Comrie, but the marriage was annulled in 1958 and she went on to marry Rodney Kay-Kreizman.

Jordan was a full-time organiser in the Communist Party of Great Britain in Nottingham, but he left the party with Ken Coates after the Soviet invasion of Hungary in 1956. After a brief period working with the Socialist Review Group in 1956, they joined the Revolutionary Socialist League (RSL) in 1957. Jordan edited the RSL's paper Socialist Fight before leaving to form the International Group in 1961. From 1964 to 1968 he edited and printed a weekly duplicated magazine, The Week, at his tiny bookshop at 4 Dane Street, Nottingham. It was largely financed by his skill in retailing second-hand books and comics.

A short-lived reunification of Jordan's International Group with the RSL in 1964 ended early in 1965, partly in protest at the RSL's support for the expulsion of members of the Socialist Labour League from the Wandsworth Labour Party. Working with Tony Southall, Charlie van Gelderen, Ken Coates and a group of students from the University of Nottingham, Jordan relaunched the International Group, which became the International Marxist Group in 1968.

In the 1970s Jordan worked full-time for the International Marxist Group as its national secretary and then for the Fourth International, when he helped in the work of the Africa Commission.

In 1985 he was struck by a chronically disabling stroke and removed from active political involvement. He died in August 2001.
