= Tony Topham =

Anthony John Topham (27 October 1929 – 2 March 2004) was a British academic and writer. He was an active trade unionist and campaigner for workers rights.

Topham was born in Hull. He was educated at Beverley Grammar School, and earned a degree in politics and economics from University of Leeds.

He was married to Karen, and they had two sons, Ralph and Nigel.
