= Association of Communist Workers =

British political party (1969–1997)

The Association of Communist Workers was an anti-revisionist political party in the United Kingdom.

It originated in 1969 as a split from the Revolutionary Marxist-Leninist League around Harpal Brar, together with his close comrades Kathy Sharp, Ella Rule, Iris Cremer and Godfrey Cremer. Prominent Marxists Ranjeet Brar and Joti Brar were also members of this organisation and also Carlos Martinez. Initially regarded as Maoist, it spent time working in the women's movement through its "Union of Women for Liberation". Through Brar, the group was closely linked with the Indian Workers Association, the Association of Indian Communists and the Stalin Society.

The group increasingly moved from Maoism to anti-revisionism, and in 1997 they officially dissolved the ACW and joined the Socialist Labour Party (SLP). When many of them left the SLP in 2004, they founded the Communist Party of Great Britain (Marxist–Leninist). The CPGB-ML was the founder of the broad electoral front of the Workers Party, together with George Galloway in 2019. The organisations formally separated, however in 2021.

== See also ==
- Communist Workers League of Britain (Marxist–Leninist)
- List of anti-revisionist groups
