= V P Hansrani =

Indian freedom fighter

V P Hansrani was an Indian Freedom Fighter who was based in Britain. He held leading positions in both the Indian Workers Association and the India League. He was a prolific author who worked with Krishna Menon and Sardar Ajit Singh.

== Early life ==
Hansrani was born in the late 1910s in a Rurka Kalan, a village in the 'Jullunder' (Jalandhar) district of Panjab. During his birth a 'Sheshnag' (snake) appeared, a sign of good fortune. This good fortune served him well as despite being ill as a young child, he survived and lived a life of adventure. He studied in D.A.V. College, Lahore but due to the Great Depression of the 1930s yearned to travel abroad to make a living for himself. The opportunity soon presented itself in 1939 as his best-friend, Ujagar Singh Rurka who had just returned to India from Singapore, was planning to travel to England. Upon getting a made-to-measure suit and a few shirts, he packed his belongings and bedding into an iron trunk and started his journey to England. He left his village on 5 May and arrived on the 25th, paying 212 Rupees for the Anchor Line ship voyage.

== The India League and The Indian Workers' Association (IWA) ==
Hansrani stayed in an Indian workers commune - No. 13 Sandy's Row, E.1. London. Here he met other likeminded revolutionaries. It was the men who lived, ate, and slept in this commune who then eventually founded the Indian Workers' Association (Hindustani Mazdoor Sabha). The jobs of these men varied but Hansrani was a peddlar and started life in England with only 50 shillings, £2.50. They would send remittances back to their families in India, and in return receive news about the dire situation in the country. This would often stimulate discussions amongst those in the commune, and the highly political situation in Europe in 1939 would turn these men into revolutionaries. One IWA revolutionary in particular stands out and that is Udham Singh, the man who avenged the 1919 Jallianwala Bagh Massacre.

While the Phoney War was in full swing, Hansrani moved to Coventry where he and others set-up the IWA. In 1942, at the age of 23, he was elected their president. Hansrani organised marches as a part of the Quit India Movement in the English Midlands and was the Editor of the IWA's premier news bulletin, Azad Hind. The bulletin was written in Urdu, and used to educate Indian migrants about events back home, for example, the Bengal famine. Hansrani was influenced by the young revolutionaries of the Hindustan Socialist Republican Association, especially Bhagat Singh. For many years, he was one of the IWA's commanders and organised Indian workers in support of the independence movement. This attracted the attention of Special Branch and he soon came under police surveillance for his satyagraha (non-violent protests).

He was in touch with other revolutionaries such as Sardar Ajit Singh (Bhagat Singh's uncle) with whom he exchanged many personal letters and Krishna Menon. From hosting Krishna Menon at IWA events in the mid-1940s, Hansrani developed a long working-relationship with him. In the 1940s, the IWA and the India League worked closely together as the former would organise the working classes. Such organisations worked with native British people who were also anti-imperialist, notable names include Bertrand Russell and Michael Foot.

After India won independence and then was hastily partitioned, Hansrani got involved with other activities of the IWA. Opting to make England his home, he worked on helping new migrants settle into English living. This involved ensuring that they were treated fairly at work and by landlords. He also got heavily involved with the India League and became a President of it, a position that he would cyclically have until 1975. Here he was focused on building bridges between the two communities in the U.K. This would entail putting on events to mark key dates such as Basakhi, Divali, and Gandhi's birthday, and additionally, providing free English classes to new arrivals from India and working on anti-racism campaigns. Hansrani had a love of penmanship and history, and thus documented everything. Unfortunately, he trusted a researcher from Canada with important documents relating to the IWA and the League, who then lost them.

== Personal life ==
Hansrani went back to India in 1949 to see his family and also got married. The newly weds soon arrived in England. In addition to his work in the 'Liberation of India', he successfully founded a wholesale knitwear business and was a member of the National Secular Society.
