= CWLB =

CWLB may refer to the:

- Canada Worker Lockdown Benefit
- Communist Workers League of Britain (Marxist–Leninist)
