= RMLL =

RMLL may stand for:

- Rocky Mountain Lacrosse League
- Rencontres Mondiales du Logiciel Libre, the French name of the Libre Software Meeting
- Revolutionary Marxist–Leninist League
