= Opposition to the National Front (UK) =

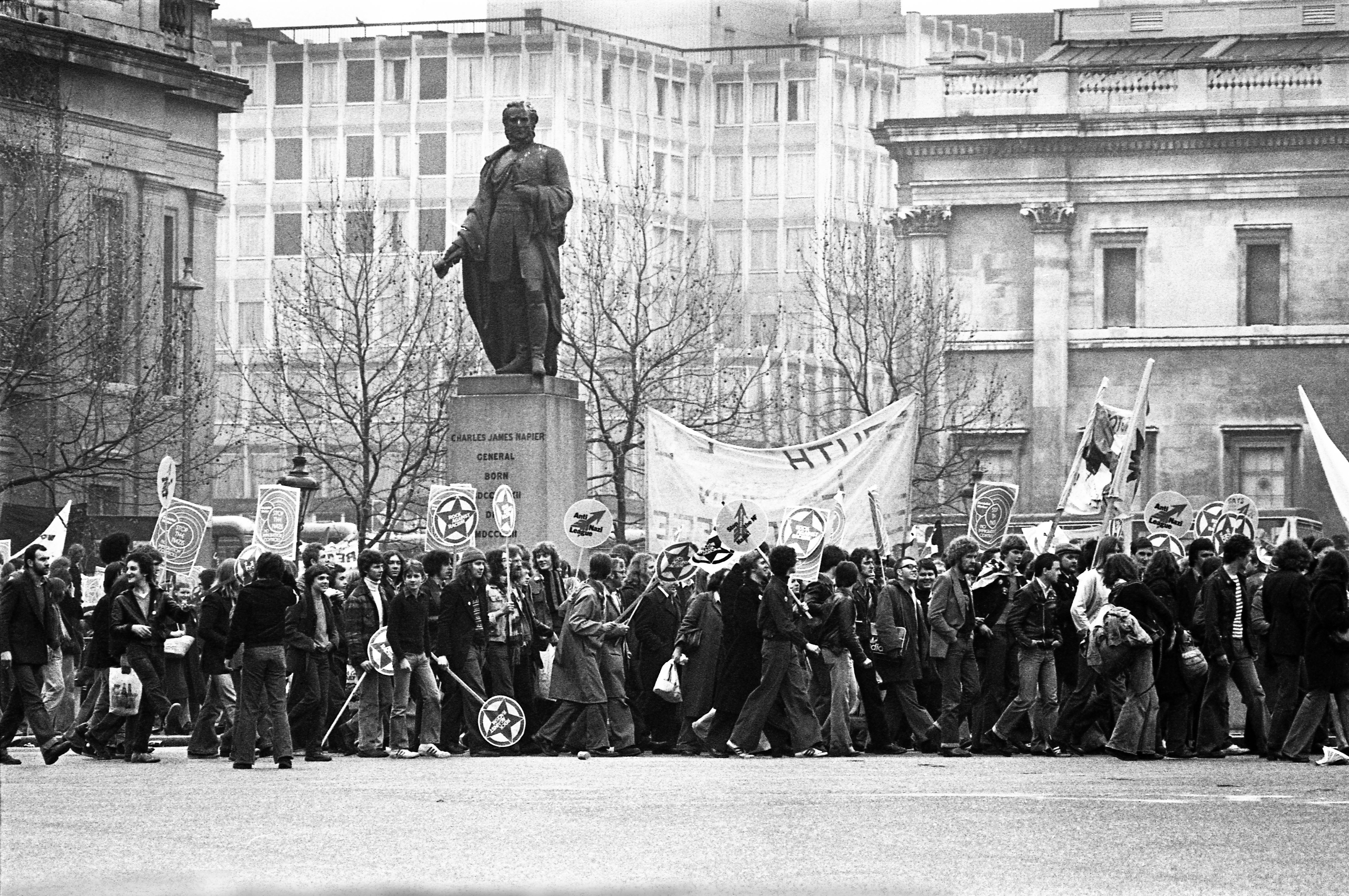
The Rock Against Racism movement was established to combat the National Front in the 1970s.

The existence of the United Kingdom's National Front, of a far-right "avowedly racialist nationalist party" was a provocation both to the political left and the "whole range of established political opinion", with the NF's opponents perceiving it as "a loathsome graveyard echo of the old Nazism". The NF's rise in 1973–74 was noticed by the leaders of major social and political groups but they generally ignored it, hoping that depriving it of additional publicity would hasten its decline.

Two groups that took a different approach were the Jewish community and the far-left. Concerned by the Front's anti-Semitism, the Board of Deputies of British Jews for instance produced anti-NF literature. The British far-left followed the older arguments of Marxist thinkers like Leon Trotsky that a fascist movement was being prepared by the ruling bourgeois amid capitalist crisis to replace the liberal democratic order with an authoritarian state that could crush the working-class movement. Approaches to the NF differed among far-left groups. The Communist Party of Great Britain and Labour Party Young Socialists sought to mobilise the labour movement against racism to diffuse the NF's appeal. The International Marxist Group and International Socialists/Socialist Workers Party instead favoured direct action to disrupt the NF, holding to the slogan: "No platform for fascists".

At its April 1974 annual conference, the National Union of Students—then influenced by the International Marxist Group—adopted a 'no platform' policy regarding the NF. The National Union of Mineworkers called for a government ban of the party. By the October 1974 election, the Labour Party forbade its candidates to share public platforms, radio, or television slots with NF candidates. 120 Labour-controlled councils banned the party from using local municipal halls. In the mid-1970s, Labour and the Trades Union Congress (TUC) helped mobilise the trade union movement at the grassroots level against the NF. The TUC had previously been reticent about launching large-scale anti-racist campaigns, but agreed to do so amid growing far-left pressure and an awareness of the threat to trade unionism posed by a resurgent fascist movement. In 1977, a joint Labour/TUC project launched a political broadcast that interspersed footage of the NF with that of Hitler and Italian Fascist leader Benito Mussolini; it also issued a leaflet titled "The National Front is a Nazi Front" containing the phrase: "Yesterday – the Jews; today coloured people; tomorrow you".

In these months before the general election the Nazis will seize every opportunity to spread their propaganda. During the election itself, National Front candidates might receive equal TV and radio time to the major parties. The British electorate will be exposed to Nazi propaganda on an unprecedented scale. This must not go unopposed. Ordinary voters must be made aware of the threat which lies behind the National Front. In every town, in every factory, wherever the Nazis attempt to organize, they must be countered.

— The Anti-Nazi League's founding statement, 1977

Anti-fascist and anti-racist groups appeared in response to the NF and other racist activities, co-ordinating their efforts through the National Co-Ordinating Committee founded in September 1977. In November 1977, various left and far-left groups launched the Anti-Nazi League (ANL); it attracted public endorsements from several Labour politicians, trade union leaders, academics, actors, and sports people. Some of these later distanced themselves from it amid concerns that its sub-campaign, School Kids Against the Nazis, was politicising school pupils with far-left propaganda. In 1976 Rock Against Racism was launched, holding two well-attended music festivals in London in 1978; performers included The Clash and Steel Pulse. In 1977, the British Council of Churches assembly agreed to launch its own anti-fascist and anti-racist organisation, resulting in the creation of Christians Against Racism and Fascism in January 1978.

Many opposed to the NF were cautious about joining groups with prominent far-left contingents, and as a more moderate alternative to the ANL, in December 1977 the MP Joan Lestor founded the Joint Committee Against Racialism (JCAR), which united Labour, Conservative, and Liberal Party members. JCAR was endorsed by Labour, the Liberal Party, the Executive Council of the National Union of the Conservative Party, the National Union of Students, the Board of Deputies of British Jews, the British Council of Churches, the Supreme Council of the Sikhs, the Federation of Bangladeshi Organisations, the Indian Workers' Association, the West Indian Standing Conference, and the British Youth Council. Taylor noted that by the end of 1977, an "unprecedented range of groups from almost every section of British society spreading right across the political spectrum had declared an intention to oppose the NF and the racism upon which it fed". In June 1978, the Anti-Racist Anti-Fascist Coordinating Committee (ARAFCC) and the National Co-ordinating Committee held a joint conference to which delegates came from student unions, trades councils, political parties, and groups representing women, ethnic minorities, and the gay community. Although designed to organise a united front against the NF and racism, it failed to do so amid arguments about tactics and approach.

Far-left activists demonstrated outside NF meetings and encouraged landlords to bar the NF from using their premises; in some instances, they physically attacked NF members. Many anti-fascists and leftists seeking to obstruct the NF were basing their strategy on a quote attributed to Hitler: "Only one thing could have stopped our movement – if our adversaries had understood its principle and from the first day smashed with the utmost brutality the nucleus of our new movement."
