= Harpal Brar =

Indian Communist politician (1939–2025)

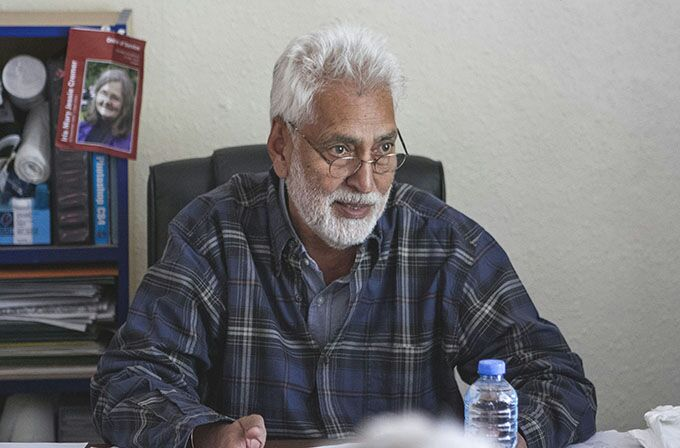
- Brar speaking in 2015
- Born: 5 October 1939; Muktsar, Punjab Province, British India
- Died: 25 January 2025 (aged 85); Mohali, Punjab, India
- Education: University of Westminster
- Occupations: Former Chairman of the CPGB-ML, Businessman, University lecturer
- Known for: Anti-imperialist activism, CPGB-ML founder, support of Irish republicanism and Palestinian solidarity
- Notable work: Inquilab Zindabad: India's Liberation Struggle (2014)
- Political party: Communist Party of Great Britain (Marxist-Leninist)
- Children: Joti Brar (daughter); Ranjeet Brar (son); Carlos Martinez (son)

Harpal Brar (5 October 1939 – 25 January 2025) was an Indian communist, politician, writer and businessman, based in the United Kingdom. He was the founder and chairman of the Communist Party of Great Britain (Marxist–Leninist), a role from which he stood down in 2018.

Born in Muktsar, Punjab, British India, Brar lived and worked in Britain from 1962, first as a student, then as a lecturer in law at Harrow College of Higher Education (later merged into the renamed University of Westminster), and later in the textile business. Brar owned buildings in West London which he used for CPGB-ML party activity, and he part-owned an online shop called "Madeleine Trehearne and Harpal Brar" which sells shawls.

Brar was the editor of a left-wing political newspaper Lalkar, the former journal of the Indian Workers' Association. Brar has written multiple books on subjects such as communism, Indian republicanism, imperialism, anti-Zionism, anti-colonialism, and the British General Strike. He was also a co-founder of the 2008 "Hands Off China" campaign.

== Political activities ==
Brar joined the Maoist Revolutionary Marxist-Leninist League but soon left to become a founder member of a small group, the Association of Communist Workers, as well as being a member of the Association of Indian Communists.

He and his comrades officially dissolved the ACW in 1997 to join Arthur Scargill's Socialist Labour Party, a breakaway from the Labour Party after its abandonment of the original version of Clause IV. Brar was the parliamentary candidate in Ealing Southall in 2001, coming eighth with 921 votes. He had previously come fourth in the 1997 general election, with 2107 votes. Brar and his comrades worked to bring what they described as an Anti-Revisionist Marxist-Leninist programme to the SLP, but were eventually expelled seven years later.

Scargill expelled the entire Yorkshire Regional Committee and five members of the National Executive Committee. From this, in July 2004, the Communist Party of Great Britain (Marxist-Leninist) was formed, and Brar was its chairman.

Adopting positions maintained by Brar and his comrades since the 1960s, the CPGB-ML has been vigorously opposed to all those who work with or in any way endorse the Labour Party since its inception. Its stated aim on formation was to oppose opportunism in the working-class movement, revive the "class against class" programme embodied by the Communist Party of Great Britain during the 1920s, and to work for the establishment of socialism in Britain.

The Communist Party of Great Britain (Marxist–Leninist) was registered with the Electoral Commission in 2008 under the name "Proletarian", which is the title of the bi-monthly newspaper of the CPBG-ML. The party was registered "to prepare for standing in elections".

At the eighth congress of the CPGB-ML in September 2018, Brar announced that he would step down as chairman of the party, to be replaced by Ella Rule.

== Views on China ==
On 19 July 2008, Harpal Brar was one of the people who founded the "Hands Off China" campaign, dedicated to defending the People's Republic of China and to defending "China's sovereignty and territorial integrity" and "the country's just stance on issues of its vital national interest such as Taiwan and Tibet."

== Views on India ==
Brar strongly disagreed with the popular belief that the Indian independence movement was peaceful and pacifist, and was led entirely by Mahatma Gandhi and the Indian National Congress. In his book Inquilab Zindabad: India's Liberation Struggle he argues that a violent and bloody class struggle involving the masses took place. He accuses Gandhi and Congress of supporting British imperialism, describing the latter as "the most compromising, cowardly and obscurantist representatives of the India bourgeoisie".

== Views on the Soviet Union ==
Brar defended the governments and leaders of the USSR until the appearance of Khrushchevite revisionism during the 20th Congress of the Communist Party of the Soviet Union in 1956. Lalkar, the newspaper edited by Brar, criticises The British Road to Socialism (the programme of the original Communist Party of Great Britain) from its earliest version in 1951 as "un-Marxist" and regards the claim that Joseph Stalin approved it as a "fiction". Brar is seen as an admirer of Stalin and has been attacked as an "anachronism" in the Weekly Worker publication of the Communist Party of Great Britain (Provisional Central Committee), which Brar in turn regarded as Trotskyite propaganda.

He has chaired and was an active member of the Stalin Society, along with his daughter Joti Brar (deputy leader of the Workers Party of Britain). The Society denies Soviet wrongdoing in the Katyn massacre which they blame on the Nazis, the Soviet famine of 1932–33 which they blame on foreign sanctions, kulak sabotage and weather patterns, and the Moscow Trials which they describe as fair process.

== Publications ==
For many years, he was on the executive of the Indian Workers Association (GB) and was the editor of that organisation's journal Lalkar. He continued to publish the journal, but the IWA cut its ties with the paper in 1992, when members of the executive committee with Communist Party of India (Marxist) affiliations objected to Brar's publishing of an article that was mildly critical of the adoption of market socialism in China.

From 1992, Brar himself published 14 books on various aspects of Marxism, imperialism and revisionism. These works are a combination of original material and articles previously published in Lalkar and have been translated and distributed internationally by a number of sympathetic communist parties around the world.

== Death ==
Brar died in Mohali, Punjab, India on 25 January 2025, at the age of 85.

== Works ==
- Perestroika: The Complete Collapse of Revisionism, 1992
- Trotskyism or Leninism?, 1993
- Social Democracy: The Enemy Within, 1995
- Imperialism: Decadent, Parasitic, Moribund Capitalism, 1997
- Bourgeois Democracy and Fascism, 2000
- Imperialism in the Middle East: With Specific Reference to the Struggle of the Palestinian People for National Self-Determination, with Ella Rule, 2002
- The Soviet Victory Over Fascism, 2006
- 60th Anniversary of the Victory Over Fascism, 2006
- Imperialism: The Eve of the Social Revolution of the Proletariat, 2007
- Nato's Predatory War Against Yugoslavia, 2009
- The 1926 British General Strike, 2009
- Revisionism and the Demise of the USSR, 2011
- Inquilab Zindabad: India's Liberation Struggle, 2014
- World War One: An Interimperialist War to Redivide the World, with Ella Rule, 2015
- Zionism: A Racist, Antisemitic and Reactionary Tool of Imperialism, 2015
- Socialism with Chinese Characteristics: Marketization of the Chinese Economy, 2020
- Imperialism and War
- Bourgeois Nationalism or Proletarian Internationalism?

=== As editor ===
- Chimurenga! The Liberation Struggle in Zimbabwe, 2004

== Elections contested ==
UK Parliament elections

Date of election	Constituency	Party	Votes	%
1997	Ealing Southall	SLP	2,107	3.9
2001	Ealing Southall	SLP	921	2.0

European Parliament elections

Year	Region	Party	Votes	%	Result	Notes
1999	London	SLP	19,632	1.7	Not-elected	Multi-member constituency; party list

London Assembly elections (Entire London city)

Date of election	Party	Votes	%	Results	Notes
2000	SLP	17,401	1.0	Not elected	Multi-members party list
