= Stalin Society =

British discussion group honouring Joseph Stalin

The Stalin Society is a British discussion group for individuals who see Joseph Stalin as a great Marxist–Leninist and wish to preserve his legacy. The society originated as a consequence of the dissolution of the Soviet Union and what the members perceived as a subsequent increase in the criticism of Stalin. According to the Stalin Society's website, "[t]he Stalin Society was formed in 1991 to defend Stalin and his work on the basis of fact and to refute capitalist, revisionist, opportunist and Trotskyist propaganda directed against him".

== Organisation ==
The society is based on individual membership but political groups such as the Revolutionary Communist Party of Britain (Marxist–Leninist), and the Communist Party of Great Britain (Marxist–Leninist) are notably prominent within it. Many have pointed to a considerable overlap of membership with Arthur Scargill's Socialist Labour Party, including Scargill himself. The Stalin Society's chair, Harpal Brar, for instance, was at one time a member of both organisations (although he subsequently left the SLP to head the CPGB-ML). Through Brar, the society was also linked to the Association of Communist Workers. One of the Stalin Society's founders, Bill Bland, was expelled in an organizational dispute. Kamal Majid, a founding member of the Stalin Society, is a patron of the Stop the War Coalition.

== Views on excess mortality during Stalin’s leadership ==
The Stalin Society upholds traditional Soviet views on a number of controversial events that took place in the Soviet Union under Stalin's leadership. The Holodomor, a famine that killed millions of Ukrainians in 1932–33 and which was part of the Soviet famine of 1930–1933, is said to have resulted from poor weather conditions and sabotage by rich peasants. The belief that Stalin intentionally brought the Holodomor about in order to break the Ukrainian national spirit is attributed to 1930s anti-Soviet propaganda perpetuated by Ukrainian nationalists and McCarthyists. The Great Purge, a campaign of political repression in the Soviet Union in 1936–38, is regarded as a fair legal process designed to thwart an anti-Soviet coup, for which the numbers of imprisoned and dead have been exaggerated by anti-Soviet propagandists. The Katyn massacre, a mass execution of Polish figures in 1940, is said to have been committed by Nazi German forces who captured Polish prisoners of war held by the Soviets. Nazi propaganda is said to have been responsible for its attribution to the Soviets.

== 21st century ==
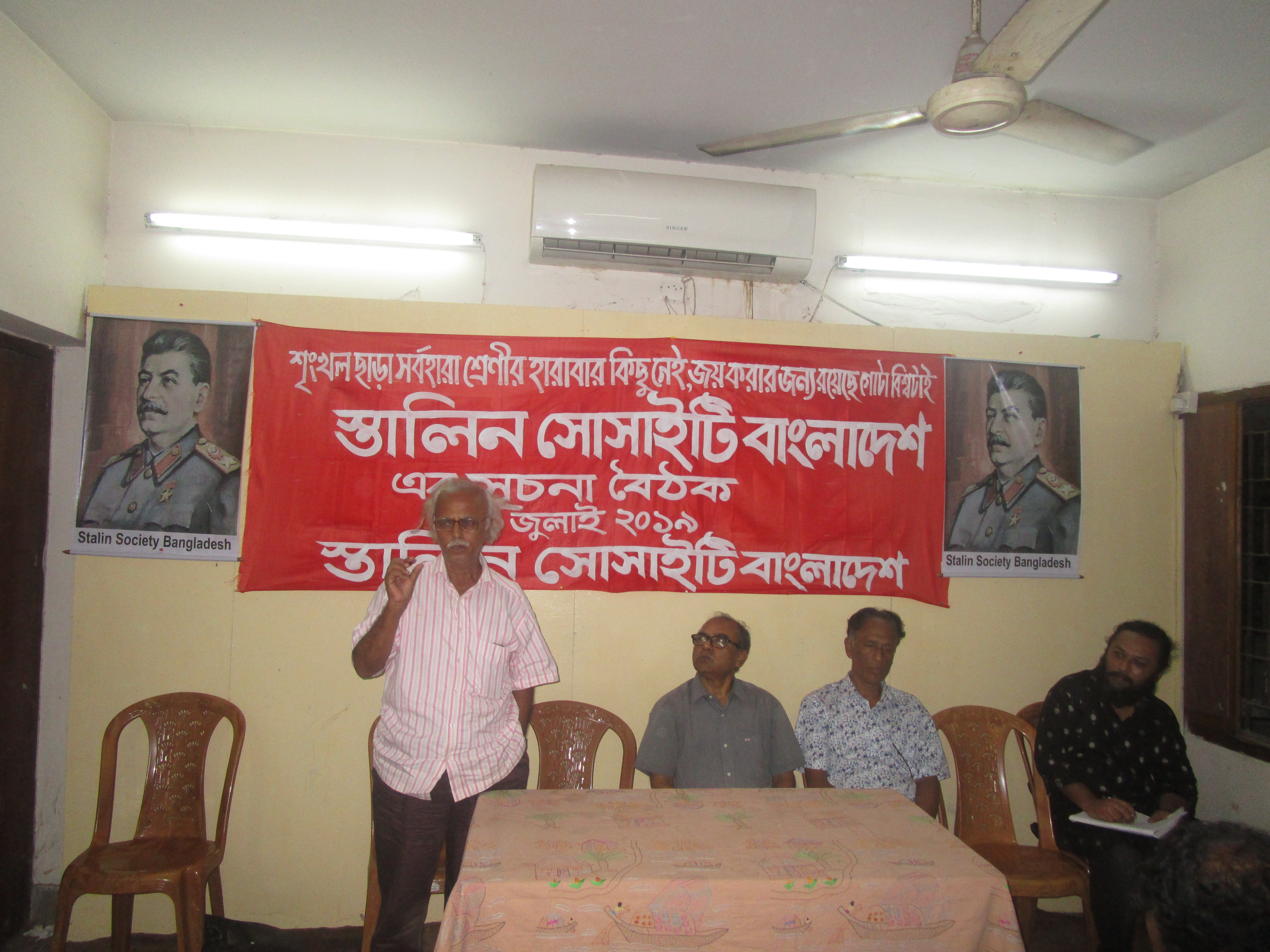
Hasan Fakri addressing a meeting of the Stalin Society, Bangladesh

The society continues to hold public meetings. The Stalin Society has produced many booklets on subjects including CPSU purges, famines and George Orwell.

== Other groups ==
The "Stalin Society of Pakistan" was formed in 2013 and has a website and Facebook account. The society has claimed on Facebook that it "stands for communist revolution in Pakistan" and on its website it states that it is "not a political party but an academic venture" which aims to "refute anti-Stalin propaganda and revisionism". Stalin Societies have also been formed in the United States and Canada, Tunisia, India, Italy, Ireland, and Argentina, and an International Stalin Society was formed in 2014.

== See also ==
- Anti-revisionism
- Neo-Stalinism
- Holodomor denial
- Cult of personality
- List of anti-revisionist groups
