= Communist Party of Great Britain (Marxist–Leninist) =

Political party in the United Kingdom

- Abbreviation: CPGB-ML
- Chairperson: Ella Rule
- Vice Chairpersons: Joti Brar; Zane Carpenter
- Founder: Harpal Brar
- Founded: 3 July 2004; 22 years ago Southall, London, England
- Split from: Socialist Labour Party
- Preceded by: RCLB; RMLL; CDRCU; ACW
- Headquarters: London (currently); before the CPGBML–WPB split in November 2022 it was in Birmingham, West Midlands, England
- Newspaper: Proletarian
- Ideology: Communism; Marxism–Leninism; Anti-revisionism; Hard Euroscepticism
- Political position: Far-left
- International affiliation: World Anti-Imperialist Platform
- Colours: Red; Yellow; White (customary)

Party flag

Website
- thecommunists.org

The Communist Party of Great Britain (Marxist–Leninist), abbreviated CPGB-ML, is an anti-revisionist Marxist–Leninist communist party in the United Kingdom, active in England, Scotland, and Wales. The CPGB-ML was founded by Harpal Brar after a split from the Socialist Labour Party (SLP) on 3 July 2004. The CPGB-ML publishes the bimonthly newspaper Proletarian, and the Marxist–Leninist journal Lalkar (originally associated with the Indian Workers' Association) is also closely allied with the party. The party chair is Ella Rule.

== History ==
The party's origins were in the Association of Communist Workers (ACW), formed by Indian communist writer and politician Harpal Brar in 1969 as a Maoist breakaway from the Revolutionary Marxist–Leninist League, itself a Maoist split from the Communist Party of Great Britain (CPGB) in 1965. The ACW joined the Socialist Labour Party (SLP), led by former miners' leader Arthur Scargill, but split from it because of Scargill's refusal to accept support for North Korea and other states. As a result, Scargill chose to expel a number of members of the party's central committee and its entire Yorkshire region. Those expelled, along with others who resigned, founded the CPGB-ML in 2004 in Southall, London.

== Policies and ideology ==
The CPGB-ML adheres to Marxism–Leninism, the political theory adopted by the Communist Party of the Soviet Union (CPSU). It has been described as "pro-Juche" and "arch-Stalinist", and its stances have been described as left-nationalist, espousing "conservative (anti-'woke') social policies", and pro-Lexit. The CPGB-ML praises communist leaders such as Vladimir Lenin, Karl Marx, Joseph Stalin, Mao Zedong, Kim Il Sung, Enver Hoxha and Fidel Castro. The party opposes Trotskyism, social democracy, democratic socialism and what they term revisionist (including Khruschevite) parties. In 1995 former CPGB-ML chairman Harpal Brar published a book titled Social Democracy: The Enemy Within.

=== Domestic policy ===
==== Scottish independence ====
The party accepted a position at its 2012 congress that there are no separate English and Scottish nations, but rather, when those nations were at the point of developing as modern capitalist economies, their ruling classes joined to form a British nation. Though the CPGB-ML believes in local/workers democracy, it sees the Scottish independence movement as diversionary from building a working-class movement across the historic nation of Great Britain and therefore opposes it. It claims that proposals set forward for Scottish independence will not break the Union, the British state, or the British army in any significant manner. In its opposition to Scottish independence, it stands at odds with the Scottish Socialist Party, the Socialist Workers Party and the Socialist Party (England and Wales).

==== Northern Ireland ====
On Northern Ireland, the CPGB-ML has called for the withdrawal of British troops from Ireland and for a unified 32-county Irish state to be formed. It supports Sinn Féin's leadership of the Good Friday Agreement, which it believes falls within this framework.

==== Brexit ====
The CPGB‑ML supported a pro‑Leave ("Lexit") position in the 2016 United Kingdom European Union membership referendum, arguing that withdrawal from the EU would curb the influence of British, European and US imperialism.

After Article 50 was invoked in March 2017, the party welcomed the step, describing it as a setback for Britain’s finance‑capitalist elite.

During the 2018 discussion over a possible second referendum, CPGB‑ML publications characterised the proposed "people’s vote" as an attempt by finance capital to reverse the Leave result.

For the 2019 European Parliament election the party advised supporters to cast a tactical vote for the Brexit Party in order to intensify internal divisions within Britain’s ruling class.

Following the December 2019 United Kingdom general election, the CPGB‑ML argued that the working‑class gave a renewed mandate to complete Brexit and described itself as "a motive force in launching the Workers Party of Britain", noting that party vice‑chair Joti Brar was elected WPB deputy leader at its founding congress.

=== Workers Party of Britain (2019 – 2022) ===
The CPGB‑ML was a driving force behind the creation of the Workers Party of Britain (WPB) in January 2020, forming what it described as an "alliance" with former Respect Party MP George Galloway. At the founding congress, CPGB‑ML vice‑chair Joti Brar was elected WPB deputy leader.

Initially the party encouraged members to build WPB branches, presenting the new organisation as a vehicle for breaking working‑class allegiance to Labour. A statement issued in February 2022 argued, however, that "developments since that time have led the party to withdraw our members’ efforts from the Workers Party project", describing the WPB as "a left‑social‑democratic vehicle for bourgeois parliamentarism and anticommunism".

=== Foreign policy ===
The CPGB-ML supports a number of governments around the world, such as those of China, Venezuela, Russia, Cuba, Zimbabwe, and Iran. Delegations from the Chinese, Cuban, Venezuelan, North Korean, and Laotian embassies have attended meetings of the CPGB-ML.

The party is Anti-Zionist and has called for the dissolution of the State of Israel, which it calls an apartheid state. It called for a defeat of British troops in Iraq and Afghanistan and a movement of direct action and non-cooperation among British working people in order to exert political influence. It was one of many anti-war parties which opposed NATO's 2011 military intervention in Libya and the 2014 United States intervention in Syria and supported the governments of Muammar Gaddafi and Bashar al-Assad.

In 2011, the CPGB-ML party chairman Harpal Brar visited Libya during the war to express solidarity with the Libyan people in their fight against NATO. The CPGB-ML joined the Stop the War Coalition shortly after the CPGB-ML's formation in 2004, but was ultimately expelled from the coalition. The CPGB-ML said that this was due to its attacks on the STWC leadership's positions on Libya and Syria, which it characterised as "pro-imperialist".

The CPGB-ML's foreign policy stance includes the defence of the legacy of the late ousted President of Zimbabwe, Robert Mugabe.

The CPGB-ML also supports the government of North Korea and what it called its anti-imperialist stance in April 2013, as well as its opposition to Western efforts to discourage North Korea from acquiring nuclear weapons.

The CPGB-ML has shown support for the yellow vests movement in France, which it perceives as a grass-roots working-class movement opposed to capitalism and the European Union. In a similar vein, the party supported the Canada convoy protest in late 2021.

The CPGB-ML regards the 2022 Russian invasion of Ukraine as a defensive war against "state-sanctioned neo-Nazis" and the "spread of Western hegemony".

=== Other positions ===
The CPGB-ML did not condemn the 2011 England riots, but instead characterised them as a rudimentary form of anti-capitalist resistance that lacked adequate leadership and direction. The CPGB-ML is opposed to immigration controls, which it holds are measures to misdirect workers and blame each other for the crisis rather than the bourgeoisie.

==== LGBT+ and identity politics ====
The party has been described as left-nationalist and socially conservative. At its 8th congress in September 2018, the party adopted a motion opposing "discrimination on grounds of race, sex or sexual proclivity" but condemning "identity politics, including LGBT ideology" as "reactionary and anti-working class", and declaring members promoting what they define as identity politics liable to expulsion. The party's congress declared that "the propagation of identity politics, including LGBT ideology, being reactionary and anti-working class and a harmful distraction and diversion from the class struggle of the proletariat for its social emancipation, is incompatible with membership of the party, rendering those involved in its promotion liable to expulsion." The CPGB-ML have described identity politics as a "reactionary nightmare" imposed by the bourgeoisie. This had led to allegations of transphobia by other organisations belonging to the British left. The party has also stated its opposition to feminism as a bourgeois movement. It has argued that intersectionality undermines Marxism instead of complementing it.

== Activities ==
The CPGB-ML is involved in a number of British political movements such as Palestinian solidarity, anti-austerity, anti-war, anti-Maidan, and opposed to the use of drone strikes by the US and NATO against civilians.

The CPGB-ML holds three annual events:

- Participation in the London May Day Organising Committee’s May Day march to Trafalgar Square every year on 1 May.
- An international barbecue which invites members from friendly parties, unionists, and representatives from countries the party supports, particularly North Korea and Cuba, as the barbecue is held near the anniversary of the Korean War and the storming of the Moncada Barracks.
- A celebration of the October Revolution, the first successful Marxist–Leninist revolution, which resulted in the creation of the Soviet Union, the world's first constitutionally communist state.
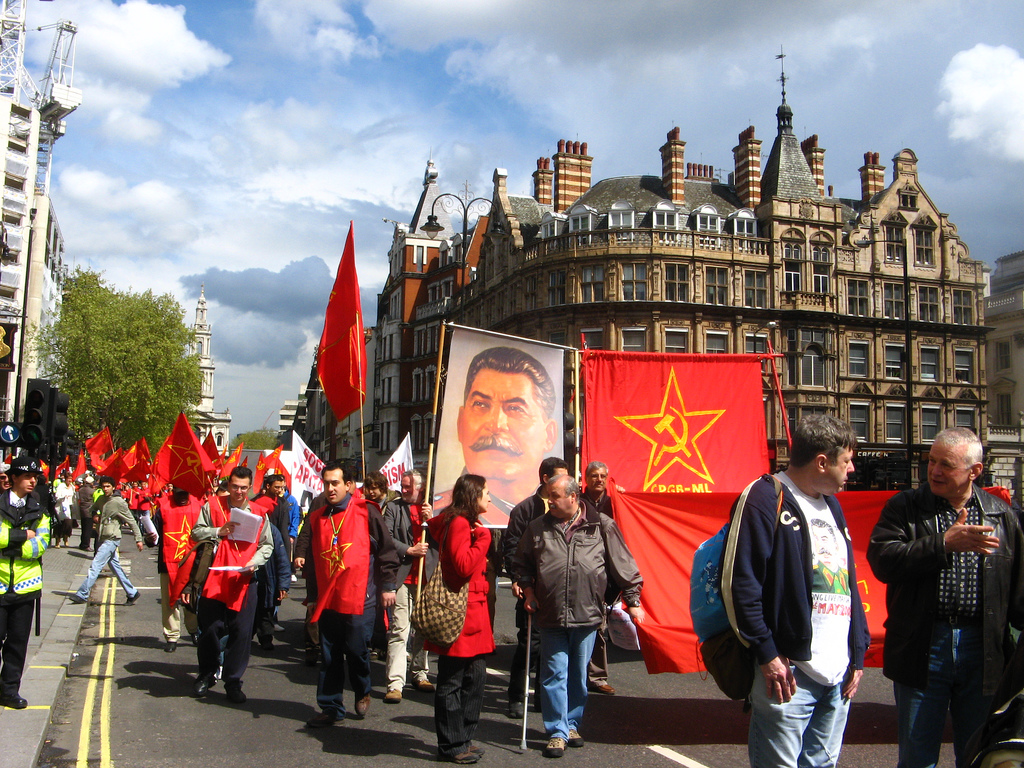

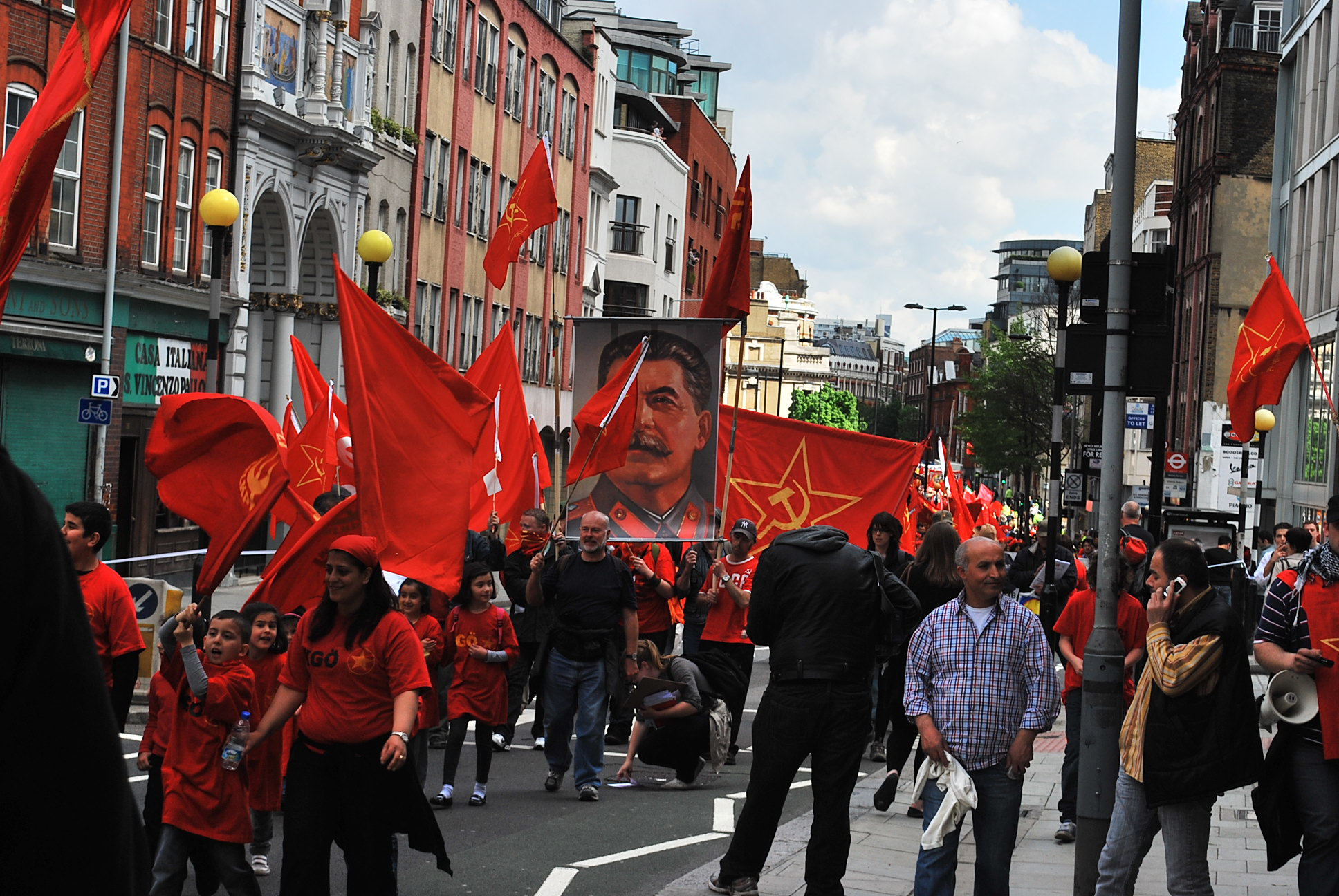
The CPGB-ML participates in May Day parades with Joseph Stalin's portrait in London, such as in 2008 and 2010, respectively.

The party was known for being the only party to carry a banner of Joseph Stalin, including a quote from Stalin, every year, until 2019, on 1 May International Workers' Day march in London. The quote is from Foundations of Leninism, a 1924 book written by Stalin, saying: "Either place yourself at the mercy of capital, eke out a wretched existence as of old and sink lower and lower, or adopt a new weapon – this is the alternative imperialism puts before the vast masses of the proletariat. Imperialism brings the working class to revolution."

The first election fought by party members was the 2018 Birmingham city council election. Three member-candidates stood under the registered label/sub-party "Birmingham Worker". Their best result was in the Balsall Heath West ward with 6.1% of the vote and third place, ahead of the local Greens and Conservatives. In the Brandwood & King's Heath and Stirchley wards the others gained 0.89% and 1.62%, beating the local TUSC candidate in the former.

The CPGB-ML welcomed the founding of the Workers Party of Britain (WPB) by former Labour and Respect party MP George Galloway. Many CPGB-ML members were active in the WPB. The vice-chair of the CPGB-ML, Joti Brar, was also the deputy leader of the WPB.

== Prominent members ==
The CPGB-ML has a few members from the early days of the British communist movement and the original CPGB. Isabel Crook, wife of David Crook, served as Honorary President before she died in 2023 aged 107. Both were communists who were in Spain during the Spanish Civil War and later went to work for Mao Zedong and the Chinese communists. Veteran British communist Jack Shapiro, a veteran of the anti-revisionist movement and lifelong communist, was a member of the CPGB-ML until his death.

For fourteen years, from the party's founding in 2004 until 2018, the party chairman was the retired university law lecturer, writer and businessman Harpal Brar. The party's vice-chairman and international secretary was Ella Rule, while the party's general secretary was Zane Carpenter. At the 8th party congress in Birmingham in 2018 Harpal Brar stepped down as party chair and was replaced by Ella Rule. Zane Carpenter and Joti Brar became the party's vice chairs.

Russian National Bolshevik, Beness Aijo, was a member during his time living in London.

Despite not being a member, the politician, writer and broadcaster George Galloway has delivered multiple speeches to CPGB-ML events and conferences.

== See also ==
- Far-left politics in the United Kingdom
- Neo-Stalinism
- Stalin Society
- List of anti-revisionist groups
