= India Club, London =

Social club in London, England

Coordinates: 51.5115°N 0.1184°W

The India Club
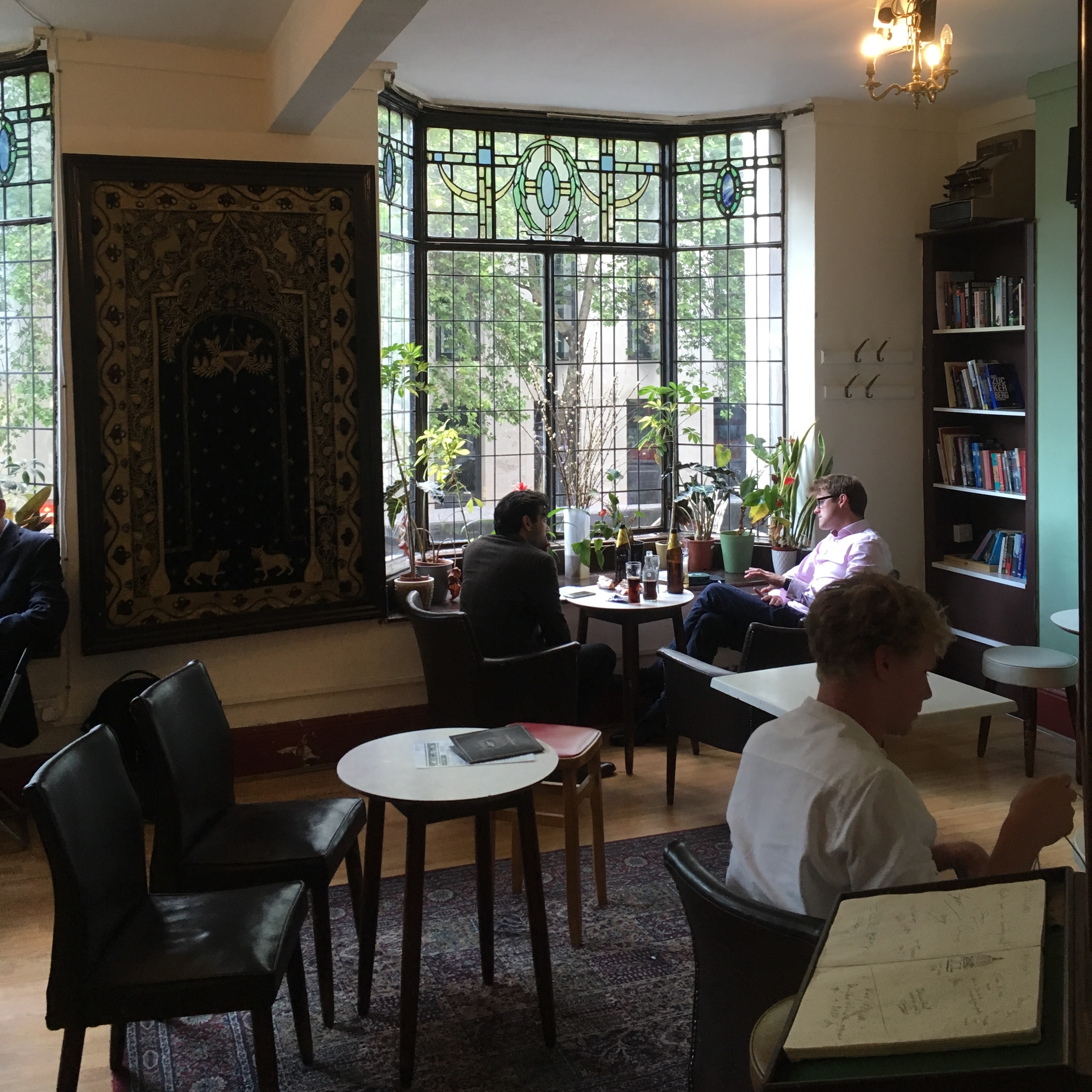
- Formation: 1951
- Defunct: September 2023
- Location: 143 Strand London, WC2R 1JA

The India Club was a social and dining club on the Strand in London, England. It was established in 1951 by members of the India League under the leadership of Krishna Menon. It closed in September 2023.

== History ==
The India Club traced its roots back to the India League, a historic organisation which played a prominent role in the Indian independence movement. The League resolved following India's independence in 1947 that its future role would be to focus on relations between India and the United Kingdom. The India Club was formally set up in 1951 to serve this purpose, under the leadership of V. K. Krishna Menon; founding members included Lady Mountbatten and Jawaharlal Nehru.

The club was originally located in Craven Street off Charing Cross before moving in 1964 to its present home at nearby 143-145 Strand, inside the Hotel Strand Continental.

The India League ran a Free Legal Advice Bureau at the club, which served as a welcoming base for newly arrived migrants from the Indian sub-continent during the mid-twentieth century. The venue was also used as an events space by the Indian Journalist Association, the Indian Workers Association and the Indian Socialist Group of Britain.

Later the space ceased to be a members' club and became open to all. From the 1950s, it served as a home away from home for members of the Indian diaspora, in its early days one of few places in London serving familiar food. Yadgar Marker and his daughter Phiroza became its owners in the 1990s. The building retained original colonial features from the time of occupation by the India League. By the 21st century it was the only building in London connected to the India League which had been neither re-developed nor re-purposed. Portraits and photographs of famous historical figures from the Indian independence movement adorned the walls. The National Trust staged an exhibition about the venue's history in 2019.

== Closure ==
In September 2017 plans were submitted to Westminster City Council for the building to be partially demolished, replacing the India Club with en-suite hotel bedrooms. In May 2018, Historic England rejected an application for listed status, which would have saved the club, but later that year the council rejected the redevelopment plans after a petition to save the club reached more than 26,000 signatures.

In August 2023, the owners announced that the India Club would close after 17 September 2023.
