= Lalkar (magazine) =

London Magazine

Lalkar is a London-based bi-monthly political magazine. The word "lalkar" means "challenge" in Punjabi and the expression "lal kar" means "red work".

== History and profile ==
Lalkar was founded in 1967. Formerly the official journal of the Indian Workers' Association, it is now an independent Marxist-Leninist journal previously edited by the late Harpal Brar, the founder and former chairman of the Communist Party of Great Britain (Marxist-Leninist).

== See also ==
- Proletarian (magazine)
