= Communist Workers League of Britain (Marxist–Leninist) =

Maoist political party

The Communist Workers League of Britain (Marxist–Leninist) (CWLB) was a Maoist political party in Britain.

The CWLB arose from a split in the Revolutionary Marxist–Leninist League (RMLL), with the new group founded by Ed Davoren in 1969. Like the RMLL, the CWLB saw solidarity work as the key to party-building. It set up and initially worked only within the Irish National Liberation Solidarity Front (INLSF). It presumably decided this was a dead end, for, without any acknowledgement of its activities within the INLSF, the CWLB commenced in 1972 to work under its own name, publishing a journal Voice of the People. Around this time, like the Revolutionary Communist League of Britain a few years later, it decided that it must devote all its practical activities to industrial work. In 1974 it published Building Revolutionary Communist Bases at the Place of Work. The CWLB had had few contacts with other Maoists, but in 1976 it published Hey! It’s Up to Us! Draft Theses, Conclusions and Proposals of the Communist Workers League of Britain (Marxist-Leninist) on the Central Question of Party Building, a call to the rest of the movement to collectively study and apply the international experience of party-building. Hey! It’s Up to Us! was launched at a well-attended public meeting in London. Members of the Communist Federation of Britain (Marxist–Leninist), then in the process of rejecting the federalist approach, attended the conference to criticise the CWLB's proposals as an incorrect federalist party-building strategy. The CFB published its criticisms as "Active Ideological Struggle is the Key Link in Party-Building", Revolution, no. 3 (January 1977). A commission on party-building was launched after the conference, but withered away within a few months. It is unclear who participated in it, but its positivist outlook inspired the later proposal of the Nottingham Communist Group that a Programme Commission was the way forward.

The CWLB dissolved itself in 1981.

== See also ==
- Association of Communist Workers
