= Indian Workers' Association =

Political organisation of Indian immigrants to Britain

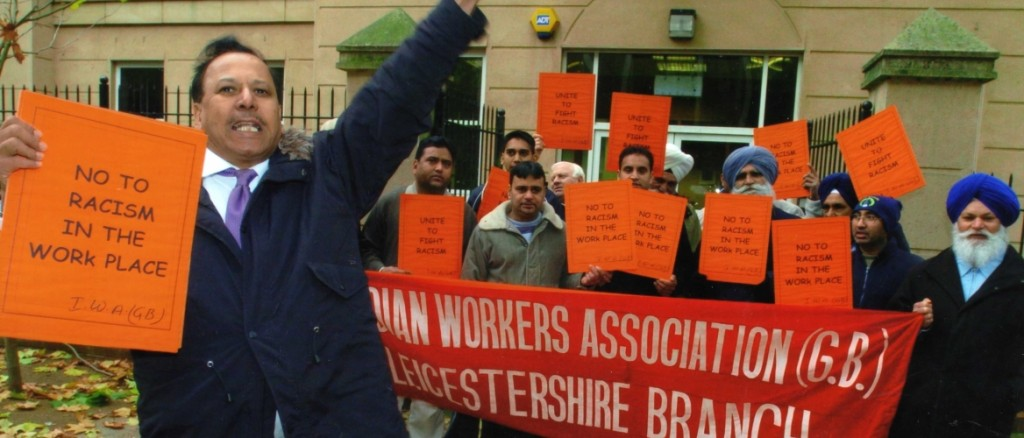
The IWA(G.B)’s Leicestershire branch at a protest against racial discrimination in the workplace

The Indian Workers' Association (IWA) is a political organisation in Great Britain which consists of Indian immigrants to Britain and their descendants. IWA branches are organised in some major cities such as Birmingham and London. As one of the oldest and most active groups of immigrants, the organisation has been working in the fields of politics, race relations, industrial relations and social welfare, as well as many cultural issues. At the forefront of the struggle within trade unions, it has campaigned tirelessly against racism and on civil liberties issues.

Pamphlets, memorandum and statements are frequently issued by the IWA and the press regularly interview IWA leaders. Azad Hind was its earliest publication written by V P Hansrani with assistance from Kartar Nagra. By doing such publications and statements, the IWA remains permanently in the public eye. Their activity includes anti-racism campaigning, industrial action, social work within immigrant communities, and film shows. Their members included Udham Singh, and they focused on agitating for Indian independence. After this was achieved, the groups became largely moribund. The IWA (GB) continues to support struggles among workers in the Asian community in the UK and revolutionary change in India.

The journal Lalkar, which used to be linked to the IWA, is now independent (it is edited by Harpal Brar of the Communist Party of Great Britain (Marxist–Leninist)).

== Foundation ==
The Indian Workers' Association (Hindustani Mazdoor Sabha) has its foundations in London in the 1930s and was formalised in Coventry by immigrant workers from India. It was formalised on 24 December 1939 at 46 Welgarth Avenue Coventry, by men such as VP Hansrani and its first President was Chanan Kooner.

Shaheed Udham Singh, a member of the famous Ghadar Party also facilitated the founding of the Indian Workers Association by his activities in London. The stated aim of the IWA was the establishment of an independent India, and the organisation worked with the India League in this particular endeavour. The IWA published bulletins in Urdu and Panjabi called Azad Hind to educate Indian migrants about the independence movement and the need for an independent India. This publication was written and edited by Vidya Parkash Hansrani with assistance from Kartar Singh Nagra. After the execution of Udham Singh in 1940, up until the late 1950s, prominent activists of the IWA included - Surat Alley, V P Hansrani, Ujagar Singh Rurka, Kartar Singh Nagra, Thakur Singh Basra, Charan Singh Chima, Mohammed Fazal Hussein, G. D. Ramaswamy, V. S. Sastrya, and Akbar Ali Khan. Many of who became chapter Presidents during this period.

The organisation has been fairly active in supporting working class struggles amongst Asians in Britain and struggles for genuine freedom for working people in India. The second generation of notable activists have included Jagmohan Joshi and Harpal Brar. Jagmohan Joshi, a leader of the IWA from the early 1960s until his death in 1979 is widely considered to have been a central figure in black political action in the 1960s and 1970s. Sivanandan refers to him as "the man who had initiated so many of the black working class and community movements of the early years and clarified for us all the lines of roll/class struggle". Remembering patriots of the Ghadar Party and supporting struggles for creation of a society in line with vision of Shaheed Udham Singh, Shaheed Bhagat Singh, Shaheed Kartar Singh Sarabha and other Patriots of the Ghadar Party has been the focus of activity.

The IWA's roots extend back to various socialist, communist and anti-capitalist organisations founded in British India which waged a struggle for an independent Indian nation, frequently in concert with other organisations involved in the independence movement. These organisations were opposed to both colonial rule and the domination of the Indian economy by quasi-feudal landlords known as zamindars which owned cash crop plantations (primary producing tea and jute, coal mines, and textile factories throughout India.

The IWA also drew inspiration from the Ghadar Movement, an early 20th century, international political movement founded by expatriate Indians to overthrow British rule in India. The Ghadar Movement was heavily socialist and communist in nature, and a British branch was founded in the early 20th century. In 1928, Krishna Menon founded the India League, an English-based organisation which peacefully campaigned for the full independence and self-governance of India, which would also influence the goals of the IWI over the next decades. The League was established in 1928 by Krishna Menon and has been described as "the principal organisation promoting Indian nationalism in pre-war Britain".

== IWA (GB) ==
In 1958, the Indian Workers' Association (GB) (IWA (GB)) was set up to provide a central national body coordinating the activities of the local groups. The Association aimed to improve conditions for immigrant workers, working alongside the mainstream British labour movement. The IWA was an organization founded and controlled primarily by Indians from the Punjab. DeWitt Johan wrote in his book, "wherever there are Punjabi immigrants in Britain, there is an Indian Workers' Association with an impressive membership".

An increasing number of activists, in particular from the Punjabi community, joined including Avtar Singh Jouhl. The Communist Party of Great Britain also gained influence, as some of the immigrants had formerly been members of the Communist Party of India. However, the large group in Southall distanced itself from the national body, supporting Labour Party candidates, joined the Campaign Against Racial Discrimination and supported the National Committee for Commonwealth Immigrants. Piara Khabra became President of the Southall group, and later, Labour MP for Ealing Southall.

== Split in the IWA (GB) ==
In 1961, the first split occurred in the IWA (G.B) at the national meeting in Birmingham. A difference of opinion between the IWA Southall leadership and the leadership of the IWA (G.B). This was the first time that the IWA of Southall withdrew from the national organisation. At that time Vishnu Sharma, a leader of the Southall IWA said "the Communist-dominated group which was completely in control of the IWA (G.B) was leading the organisation into a sectarian direction which he did not wish to follow. For this reason he decided to take Southall out of the national association". It is also said that the IWA of Southall is dominated by the Congress Party, which is possibly the main cause of the division. As proof some point to the fact that Tarsem Singh Toor, general Secretary of IWA Southall, who was assassinated in 1986, was at the same time Secretary of the Indian Overseas Congress. The IWA Southall's invitation to the former Congress prime minister Indira Gandhi, to speak in Southall in 1979, and the opposition to this raised by Joshi's IWA (GB) are also given as evidence to support this suggestion. However, the reason for the split with the IWA (GB) was fundamentally a class split. The Southall position was one of not wanting to align with the communist party but wishing to unite with all Indian people, considering that all have something significant in common by virtue of being Indian.

There was a dual system in Southall where a large section of membership came under the leadership of Vishnu Sharma and all the supporters of the midland IWA (GB) branches under the leadership of Jagmohan Joshi. However dual system broke down when a further split took place with the IWA (GB) in 1967. This split was related in a clear way to domestic Indian politics. One, led by Prem Singh, supported the Communist Party of India (Marxist), while the other, under Jagmohan Joshi, supported Naxalbari Movement. This second group began working with Black Power activists, but later disappeared. The Singh group thus became the only IWA (GB), joining the Black People's Alliance. The organisation later supported the Anti-Nazi League. This split was related in a clear way to domestic Indian politics. Indian communists worked in the IWA (GB), as well as working within the Association of Indian Communists. There were a number of differences between both organisations on a variety of issues regarding Britain, India and the wider international scene. The major difference concerned the Naxalbari Uprising in West Bengal in 1967. The uprising was not supported by the Communist Party of India (Marxist). The Communist Party of India (Marxist–Leninist) was formed by those Indian Communists who did back the rising. Two members of the politburo of the CPI (M) came to Britain to take part in a number of meetings of the Association of Indian Communist and the IWA (GB). They could not influence all the members of IWA (GB) and the Association of Indian Communists to stay with CPI (M). The outcome was a split between Jagmohan Joshi and his group, who backed the uprising, and those who were behind the CPI (M).

The position of Joshi's supporters regarding racism was that the black working class, through their struggles against imperialism in Africa and economic exploitation in the West, had become more politically aware. Black workers were therefore the group destined to lead the struggle; once they were involved, white workers would join with them too. Singh's opposition argued that black workers did not have any special role to play and the initiative for the struggle had to come from the white working class. Joshi's group saw black workers as having a special role, and believed in forging an alliance with other black groups. The other side were, however, against this kind of alliance as they considered it a kind of inverted racism which would distance them from ordinary white workers who, they felt, were the most important allies of all. The difference in these two positions was fundamental and led to Joshi's group becoming concerned with the black power issue and the other group being more committed to a traditional class analysis. The black power dimension is a fairly controversial one and the IWA had to tread carefully in defining what it meant in order not to lose Indian members.

Joshi's group also believed in defence committees (which the other group thought were suicidal) and were strongly opposed to affiliating with Commission for Racial Equality Committees or other government bodies and so was against accepting state funding. Prem Singh's group were more ambivalent on this issue.

In the 1990s they worked with the Shaheed Udham Singh Welfare Trust to campaign for the public release of last words of Udham Singh, after he was sentenced to death for assassinating Michael O'Dwyer, the former lieutenant governor of the Punjab in India, at the time of the Jallianwala Bagh massacre in Amritsar in 1919. This campaign succeeded in 1996.

The organisation is still quite active in supporting struggles for socialism in the UK and India. At national level, the IWA campaign stands against all kinds of racism and they offer a service to members on immigration, social services, housing benefits, language, policing and crime matters, as well as encouraging the membership of unions. Where there are no unions, they have helped workers to form their own. At the international level, they have always supported oppressed people and opposed child labour; and have continued campaigning against the death sentence in India and worldwide, in addition to speaking out against the violation of human rights. Currently, IWA (G.B) is campaigning for an inquiry into the actions of the British government in giving advice to the Indian government when the latter launched an attack on the Harmandir Sahib in 1984. The Indian Workers Association (G.B) remains active to this day.

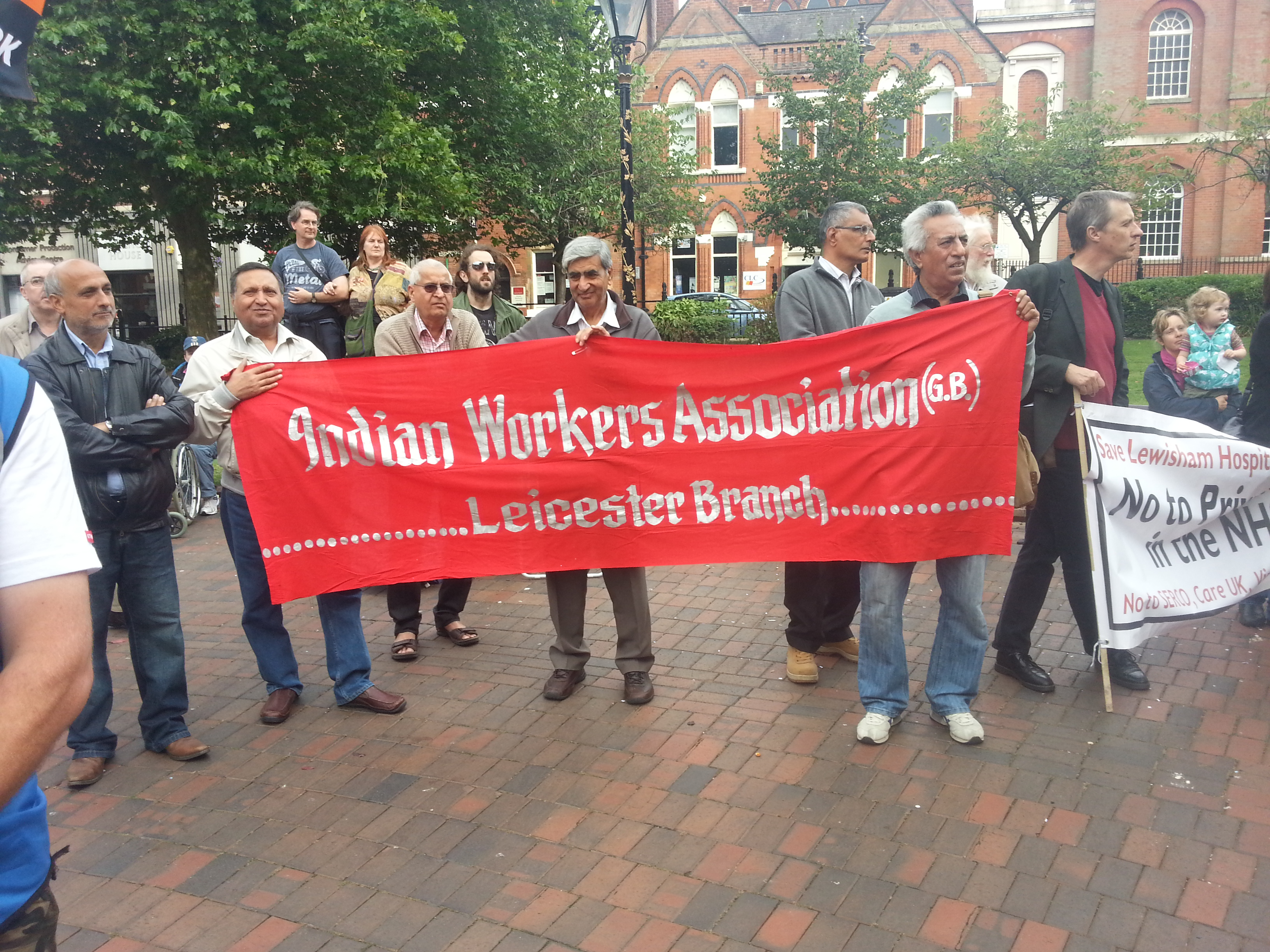
Indian Workers' Association Leicester branch 2014

== Branches in the UK ==
In Leicester an IWA branch was set up around 1954. Until mid-1960 there were more Punjabi people than any other immigrant community in Leicester. However, with the arrival in 1968-69 of Gujarati people from East Africa, their numbers overtook those of the Punjabi community. Nevertheless, Punjabi Indians continued to dominate the IWA both in Leicester and nationally. One of the reasons for the prominence of the Leicester IWA branch is the relatively large resident Indian community. According to the 1991 Census figures, the Indian population in Leicester was 60,297 of a total city population of 270,493, amounting to 22.3 per cent.

== See also ==
- British Indian
- Harpal Brar
- Lalkar
