= Socialist Labour Party (UK) =

- Abbreviation: SLP
- Leader: Jim McDaid
- President: John Tyrrell
- General Secretary: Allistair Lomax
- Deputy leader: Arthur Scargill
- Vice-President: Kathrine Jones
- Treasurer: Allistair Lomax
- Founded: 24 June 1996; 30 years ago
- Split from: Labour Party
- Membership (2022): 325
- Ideology: Socialism; Fiscal localism; Republicanism; Hard Euroscepticism
- Political position: Left-wing
- Colours: Red

Website
- socialistlabourparty.org.uk

The Socialist Labour Party (SLP) is a socialist political party in the United Kingdom. The party was established in 1996 and was led by Arthur Scargill, a former Labour Party member and the former leader of the National Union of Mineworkers. The party's name highlights its commitment to socialism and acknowledges Clause IV of the Labour Party's former constitution, as fundamental to the party's identity. As of 2024, it is led by Jim McDaid.

The SLP advocates economic localism, supported Britain's exit from the European Union and is in favour of reopening the mines.

According to accounts filed with the Electoral Commission for 2022, the Socialist Labour Party had 325 members.

== History ==
The Socialist Labour Party was founded in 1996 by Arthur Scargill. The party was founded as a reaction to Tony Blair's abandonment of Clause IV in the Labour Party's manifesto a year earlier, widely interpreted as a final rejection of a commitment to public ownership. The SLP advocates the nationalisation of leading industries privatised under Conservative Prime Minister Margaret Thatcher during the 1980s.

In 2004, a purge of a Marxist-Leninist faction, the previously external Association of Communist Workers, over the issue of lack of support for relations with North Korea, led to the formation of the Communist Party of Great Britain (Marxist–Leninist).

The party attracted trade union figures such as Mick Rix and Bob Crow.

So far, the party's only councillors have been defectors from Labour. In early-2014, three Labour councillors in Barking and Dagenham attracted attention by joining the SLP though all those who crossed the floor subsequently lost their seats at the 2014 United Kingdom local elections to Labour.

On 2 April 2019, two Labour Party councillors sitting on Hartlepool Borough Council, one of them the ceremonial mayor, defected to the SLP; complaining of racism and homophobia within Hartlepool Constituency Labour Party (CLP). Another councillor resigned and joined the party after being suspended by Hartlepool CLP amidst claims he helped one of the defectors in his election campaign. The defections gave the Socialist Labour Party its first councillors since 2014. While in the 2019 United Kingdom local elections both Hartlepool councillors lost their seats, a week later, with Labour having lost overall control of the council, the SLP gained a further three councillors, including the leader of the council. However, the party contested only one Hartlepool seat at the 2021 local elections, finishing in last place, and no longer has any elected representation.

The Socialist Labour Party campaigned for the United Kingdom to Leave the European Union at the 2016 United Kingdom European Union membership referendum. The party had also previously advocated a unilateral withdrawal from the membership bloc without invoking Article 50.

== Election results ==
=== House of Commons ===
House of Commons of the United Kingdom
Election year	Total votes	% of overall vote	Seats contested	Seats won
1997	52,109 ▲	0.2% ▲	63	0
2001	57,288▲	0.2% ▲	112	0
2005	20,167 ▼	0.1% ▼	50	0
2010	7,196 ▼	0.0% ▼	23	0
2015	3,481 ▼	0.0%	6	0
2017	1,154 ▼	0.0%	3	0
2019	494 ▼	0.0%	1	0
2024	3,609 ▲	0.0%	12	0

At the 2001 general election, the party took about 3% of the vote in seats it contested.

The party received its highest share to date of the vote in a single constituency at the 2005 general election, when it gained a 14.2% share of all the votes cast at Glasgow North East. Michael Martin, the Speaker of the House of Commons, was running in that election, and so (following British political tradition) none of the major national parties – Labour, the Conservatives or the Liberal Democrats – put forward a candidate against him.

The Socialist Labour Party did not contest the 2004 European Parliament election, but fielded a full list of candidates for England, Scotland and Wales at the 2009 European Parliament election, where it took 173,115 votes, or a 1.1% share of the vote nationwide.

=== 2010 United Kingdom general election ===
The Socialist Labour Party ran 23 candidates at the 2010 UK general election, who received a total of 7,196 votes, less than a 0.1% share of the overall vote. All candidates lost their deposits. The best results were those of Kai Andersen in Liverpool West Derby (614 votes - 1.7%) and Ken Capstick in Barnsley East (601 votes - 1.6%). At the local elections held on the same day, Andersen also received 244 votes (4.2%) in the Croxteth ward of Liverpool and in 2012 received 410 votes (14.76%) finishing in second place in the same ward.

=== 2011 Scottish Parliament general election ===
The Socialist Labour Party contested all electoral regions of the Scottish Parliament in 2011, increasing its share of the vote from 0.7% in 2007 to 0.9%. Most other political parties saw a decrease in their vote share due to the landslide victory by the Scottish National Party (SNP). The SLP beat all other left-wing opposition for the first time, as well as far-right parties like the British National Party (BNP).

=== 2011 National Assembly for Wales election ===
The Socialist Labour Party doubled its share of the vote from 1.2% in 2007 to 2.4% in 2011, giving the SLP the second-biggest percentage gain of the total votes cast in the election. It outperformed other small left-wing parties as well as the far-right BNP. The SLP also received more votes than the Welsh Green Party in two of the five regions of Wales. At the 2011 local elections on the same day, the SLP's Kenny Spain received 251 votes (equivalent to a 27% share) finishing in second place at the Rossmore ward of Cheshire West and Chester.

=== UK local elections 2014 ===
Although the SLP's three councillors, defectors from Labour in the Borough of Barking and Dagenham, lost their seats, the party's vote in the local elections of 22 May showed an upward trend. Its highest votes were polled in Barnsley where Terry Robinson received 105 votes (8.5%) in Worsborough ward while Frank Watson received 178 (9%) in Stairfoot. Elsewhere, John Tyrrell received 392 votes (6.6%) in Birmingham's Handsworth Wood ward while Barbara Bryan received 129 (6.3%) in the Linacre ward of Sefton.

=== UK general elections 2015 and 2017 ===
At the 2015 UK general election, the SLP contested seven seats in Wales. Its best result, with 697 votes (1.8%), was achieved in Torfaen by John Cox. In 2017, the best result at that year's general election, out of the SLP's three candidates put forward, was at the Birmingham Perry Barr constituency; where Shangara Bhatoe received 592 votes (equivalent to a share of 1.3%).

=== UK local elections 2018 ===
The party fielded only three candidates, all in the North West of England. Share of the vote ranged between 4 and 9%. Its best result at the Appleton ward of Halton, where a former Independent candidate, Vic Turton, obtained a 9.3% share of the vote and received 97 votes.

=== UK general election 2019 ===
The SLP only stood a single candidate at the 2019 general election, Kevin Cranney at Hartlepool. Cranney received 494 votes (equivalent to a 1.2% share).

=== UK general election 2024 ===
At the 2024 UK general election, the Socialist Labour Party achieved their best result in terms of votes cast since 2015, with 3,609 votes and contested 12 seats, the most candidates they have stood since 23 in 2010. However, despite candidates from a record thirteen different political parties elected to the UK House of Commons at the 2024 general election, no representatives were elected from the Socialist Labour Party.

The best result the SLP achieved in 2024, was once again at Birmingham Perry Barr constituency, Shangara Singh polled in last place out of eight candidates, with 453 votes and a 1.2% share of the vote.

The twelve constituencies contested by the SLP at the 2024 UK general election were: Ayrshire Central, Ayrshire North & Arran, Bangor Aberconwy, Barnsley South, Birmingham Perry Barr, Camborne & Redruth, Derbyshire South, Edinburgh North & Leith, Forest of Dean, Gloucester, Mansfield and Plymouth Sutton & Devonport.

== See also ==
- List of Labour Party breakaway parties (UK)
