= India League =

Indian nationalist organisation

Harold Laski, dominant LSE Fabian professor and president of the India League

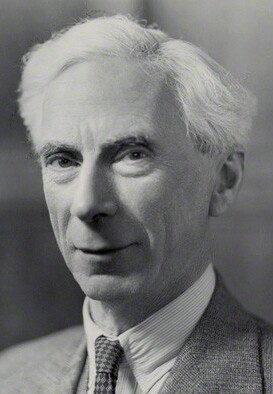
Bertrand Russell, president of the India League, frequent patron, host, and intellectual cover for events

The India League was an England-based organisation established by Krishna Menon in 1928. It campaigned for the full independence and self-governance of British India. It has been described as "the principal organisation promoting Indian nationalism in pre-war Britain".

== History ==
The India League emerged from the Commonwealth of India League, which was established in 1922 and itself emerged from the Home Rule for India League, established in 1916. When Menon became joint secretary of the Commonwealth of India League, he rejected its previous objective of dominion status for India and instead set the goal of full independence. During the 1930s, the organisation expanded and established branches in cities across Britain.

In 1930s, Menon along with other contributors had created a 554-page report on the situation in India. The report was banned in India. In 1931, Mahatma Gandhi praised the efforts of the Indian League for its "hurricane propaganda on the danger to world peace of a rebellious India in bondage".

Members of the League were largely drawn from the British elite, such as Edwina Mountbatten, Countess Mountbatten of Burma, Bertrand Russell, Harold Laski, Sir Stafford Cripps, Henry Brailsford, Leonard Matters, and Michael Foot, although a branch was established in the East End of London in the early 1940s, in order to attract more supporters from the South Asian community there. According to historian Nicholas Owen, British audiences were reluctant to believe accounts of colonial repression and social conditions in India given by Indians, and so the League sent a British delegation to India to validate its arguments, resulting in the publication in 1933 of The Condition of India. Historian Jack Bowman has shown how this report changed how the India League was viewed, partly due to the inclusion of Labour Party MPs in the delegation that was sent to India to report for The Condition of India.

In 1944, Menon reported that total membership of the league stood approximately at 1,400 members, and that 70 trade and 118 unions and other organisations are affiliated with the league.

The organisation continued to operate after India's independence in 1947 and while it focused mainly on India, "the League was internationalist in its outlook throughout, perceiving India's struggle for freedom as part of a larger struggle against imperialism and capitalism". Following Indian independence, the organisation focused on fostering relations between the UK and India and supporting Indian immigrants in the UK. It held regular meetings at the India Club, London. Latterly, its public presence faded.

In 1947 it was reported that the minimum subscription to the India League was five shillings. Branches could be established by groups of five or more people, subject to the approval of the League's executive committee. Branches were required to pay £2 6 shillings per year to the executive committee.

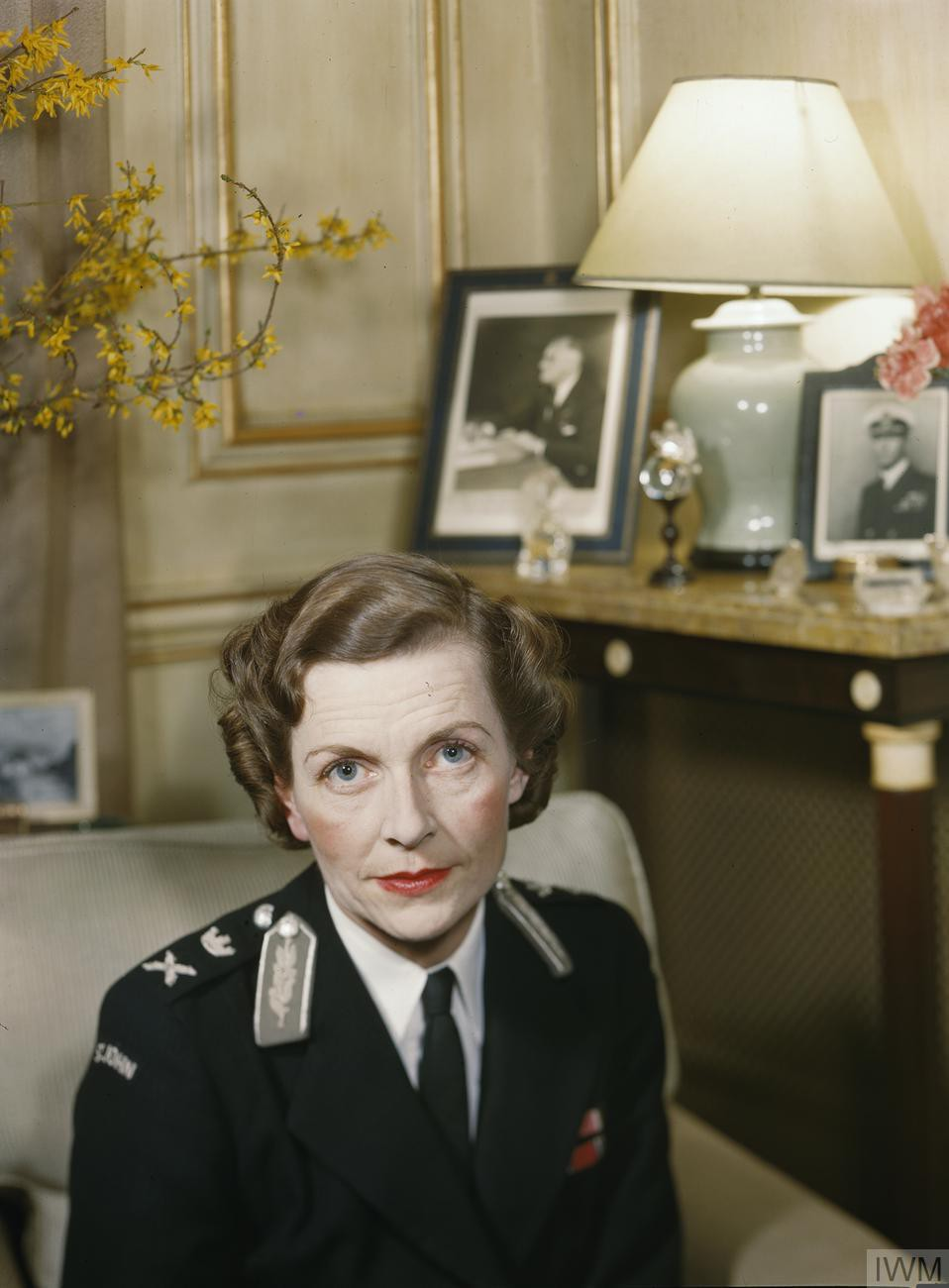
Edwina Mountbatten, Countess Mountbatten of Burma - early friend and patron of the India League

== Other members ==
- Aneurin Bevan
- Fenner Brockway
- H. N. Brailsford
- Leonard Matters
- Ellen Wilkinson
- Monica Whately
- Bhicoo Batlivala
- Shyamji Krishna Varma
- Bhikaiji Cama
- Harold Laski
