= List of left-wing political parties =

The following is a list of left-wing political parties. It includes parties from the centre-left to the far-left.

== Active ==
=== A ===
Afghanistan

- Afghanistan Liberation Organization (banned)
- Communist (Maoist) Party of Afghanistan (banned)
- National United Party of Afghanistan (National Coalition of Afghanistan)
- Pashtoons Social Democratic Party
- Progressive Democratic Party of Afghanistan
- Solidarity Party of Afghanistan
- Watan Party of Afghanistan (banned)

Åland Islands

- Åland Social Democrats
- Sustainable Initiative

Albania

- Albanian Socialist Alliance Party
- Albanian Workers Movement Party
- Communist Party of Albania
- Communist Party of Albania 8 November
- G99
- Green Party of Albania
- Reorganised Party of Labour of Albania
- Social Democracy Party of Albania
- Social Democratic Party of Albania
- Socialist Movement for Integration
- Socialist Party of Albania
- Lëvizja Bashkë

Algeria

- Algerian Party for Democracy and Socialism
- Berber Socialism and Revolution Party
- Democratic and Social Movement (Forces of the Democratic Alternative)
- Socialist Forces Front (Forces of the Democratic Alternative)
- Socialist Workers Party (Forces of the Democratic Alternative)
- Workers' Party (Forces of the Democratic Alternative)

Andorra

- Democratic Renewal
- Greens of Andorra
- Parochial Union of Independents Group
- Social Democracy and Progress
- Social Democratic Party

Angola

- CASA–CE
- MPLA
- New Democracy Electoral Union
  - Angolan Union for Peace, Democracy and Development
  - Independent National Alliance of Angola
  - Independent Social Party of Angola
  - Liberal Socialist Party
  - Movement for the Democracy of Angola
  - National Union for Democracy
- Party of the Angolan Communist Community
- Social Democratic Party
- Social Renewal Party
- UNITA

Antigua and Barbuda

- Barbuda People's Movement
- United Progressive Party

Argentina

- Authentic Socialist Party (Federal Consensus)
- Freemen of the South Movement (Federal Consensus)
- Frente de Todos
  - Broad Front
  - Civic Front for Santiago
  - Communist Party of Argentina
  - Communist Party of Argentina (Extraordinary Congress)
  - Evita Movement
  - Federal Commitment
  - FORJA Concertation Party
  - Humanist Party
  - Intransigent Party
  - Kolina
  - National Alfonsinist Movement
  - New Encounter
  - Patria Grande Front
  - Popular Unity
  - Proyecto Sur
  - Revolutionary Communist Party
  - Solidary Party
  - Victory Party
- Front for Change/Social Pole
- Generation for a National Encounter (Juntos por el Cambio)
- Liberation Party
- Movement for Socialism
- Progressive, Civic and Social Front
- Self-determination and Freedom
- Socialist Party (Federal Consensus)
- Solidarity and Equality
- United Socialist Workers' Party
- Workers' Left Front
  - Socialist Left
  - Socialist Workers' Party
  - Workers' Party
  - Workers' Socialist Movement

Armenia

- Armenia Alliance
  - Armenian Revolutionary Federation
    - All Armenian Labour Party
- Armenian Communist Party
- Citizen's Decision
- Democratic Party of Armenia
- Green Party of Armenia (Free Homeland Alliance)
- National Progress Party of Armenia (National Democratic Pole)
- People's Party of Armenia
- Progressive United Communist Party of Armenia
- Social Democrat Hunchakian Party (Armenian National Congress)
- United Communist Party of Armenia
- United Labour Party (Civil Contract)

Aruba

- People's Electoral Movement

Australia

- Australian Greens
  - ACT Greens
  - Victorian Greens
  - Greens New South Wales
  - Greens South Australia
  - Greens Western Australia
  - Northern Territory Greens
  - Queensland Greens
  - Tasmanian Greens
- Australian Labor Party
  - ACT Labor Party
  - New South Wales Labor Party
  - Territory Labor Party
  - Queensland Labor Party
  - South Australian Labor Party
  - Tasmanian Labor Party
  - Victorian Labor Party
  - Western Australian Labor Party
- Communist Party of Australia
- Communist Party of Australia (Marxist–Leninist)
- Socialist Action
- Socialist Alliance
- Socialist Alternative
- Socialist Equality Party
- Solidarity
- Victorian Socialists

Austria

- Greens – The Green Alternative, The
- KPÖ Plus
  - Communist Party of Austria
- Party of Labour of Austria
- Pirate Party of Austria
- Social Democratic Party of Austria
- Socialist Left Party
- Wandel, Der
- Workers Viewpoint

Azerbaijan

- Azerbaijan Communist Party
- Azerbaijani Social Democratic Party
- Azerbaijan United Communist Party
- Civic Unity Party
- Coordination Council of Leftist Forces
- Modern Musavat Party

=== B ===
Bahrain

- National Democratic Action Society (Banned)
- National Justice Movement
- National Liberation Front – Bahrain
- Progressive Democratic Tribune

Bangladesh

- Bangladesh National Awami Party
- Communist Party of Bangladesh
- Communist Party of Bangladesh (Marxist–Leninist) (Barua)
- Communist Party of Bangladesh (Marxist–Leninist) (Dutta)
- Communist Party of Bangladesh (Marxist–Leninist) (Umar)
- Jatiya Gano Front
- Jatiya Samajtantrik Dal (Grand Alliance)
- Jatiya Samajtantrik Dal (Rab)
- Maoist Bolshevik Reorganisation Movement of the Purba Banglar Sarbahara Party
- National Awami Party
- National Awami Party (Bhashani) (20 Party Alliance)
- Purba Banglar Sarbahara Party
- Purbo Banglar Communist Party
- Revolutionary Workers Party of Bangladesh
- Sramik Krishak Samajbadi Dal
- Socialist Party of Bangladesh
- United Communist League of Bangladesh
- Workers Party of Bangladesh (Grand Alliance)

Barbados

- Barbados Labour Party
- Clement Payne Movement
- Democratic Labour Party
- People's Empowerment Party
- People's Party for Democracy and Development

Belarus

- Belarusian Agrarian Party (Republican Coordinating Council of Heads of Political Parties and Public Associations)
- Belarusian Green Party
- Belarusian Labour Party
- Belarusian Left Party "A Just World" (United Democratic Forces of Belarus)
- Belarusian Social Democratic Assembly
- Belarusian Social Democratic Party (Assembly) (United Democratic Forces of Belarus)
- Belarusian Social Democratic Party (People's Assembly)
- Belarusian Social Sporting Party (Republican Coordinating Council of Heads of Political Parties and Public Associations)
- Belarusian Women's Party "Nadzieja" (United Democratic Forces of Belarus)
- Communist Party of Belarus (Republican Coordinating Council of Heads of Political Parties and Public Associations)
- Republican Party of Labour and Justice (Republican Coordinating Council of Heads of Political Parties and Public Associations)
- Revolutionary Action
- Social Democratic Party of Popular Accord

Belgium

- Anticapitalist Left
- Committee for Another Policy
- Communist Party of Belgium
- DierAnimal
- Ecolo
- Groen
- International Workers' League
- Left Socialist Party
- Red!
- Socialist Party
- Team Fouad Ahidar
- Vivant
- Vooruit
- Workers' Party of Belgium

Belize

- Belize People's Front
- Belize Progressive Party
- Vision Inspired by the People

Benin

- Action Front for Renewal and Development
- Communist Party of Benin
- Democratic Renewal Party
- Social Democratic Party
- Union for Homeland and Labour

Bermuda

- Progressive Labour Party

Bhutan

- Bhutan Kuen-Nyam Party
- Bhutan Peoples' Party
- Communist Party of Bhutan (Marxist–Leninist–Maoist)
  - Bhutan Tiger Force
- Druk Nyamrup Tshogpa
- People's Democratic Party (Bhutan)

Bolivia

- Communist Party of Bolivia
- Communist Party of Bolivia - Marxist Leninist Maoist
- Free Bolivia Movement
- Movement for Socialism
- Movement for Sovereignty
- Pachakuti Indigenous Movement
- People's Revolutionary Front (Marxist−Leninist−Maoist)
- Revolutionary Left Front
- Revolutionary Left Movement
- Revolutionary Liberation Movement Tupaq Katari
- Revolutionary Workers' Party
- Socialist Aymara Group
- Socialist Party-1
- Workers' Socialist Movement

Bonaire

- Bonaire Democratic Party

Bosnia and Herzegovina

- Alliance of Independent Social Democrats
- Bosnian-Herzegovinian Initiative
- Bosnian Party
- Communist Party
- Democratic Front (Bosnia and Herzegovina)
- For New Generations
- Labour Party of Bosnia and Herzegovina
- Our Party (Bosnia and Herzegovina)
- Social Democratic Party
- Socialist Party
- Workers' Communist Party of Bosnia and Herzegovina

Botswana

- Botswana Alliance Movement
- International Socialist Organization
- MELS Movement of Botswana
- Umbrella for Democratic Change
  - Botswana National Front
  - Botswana People's Party

Brazil

- Brazilian Communist Party
- Brazilian Socialist Party
- Communist Party of Brazil (Brazil of Hope)
- Democratic Labour Party
- Green Party (Brazil of Hope)
- Popular Unity
- Socialism and Liberty Party (PSOL REDE Federation)
- Sustainability Network (PSOL REDE Federation)
- United Socialist Workers' Party
- Workers' Cause Party
- Workers' Party (Brazil of Hope)

Brittany

- Breton Democratic Union (Régions et Peuples Solidaires)
- Brittany Movement and Progress
- Emgann

Brunei

- Brunei People's Party

Bulgaria

- Agrarian Union "Aleksandar Stamboliyski"
- BSP – United Left
  - Alternative for Bulgarian Revival
  - Bulgarian Social Democracy – EuroLeft
  - Bulgarian Socialist Party
  - Communist Party of Bulgaria
  - Eco Voice
  - European Security and Integration
  - Movement 21 (de facto)
  - Movement for Social Humanism
  - Podem [bg]
  - Political Club "Thrace" [bg]
- Bulgarian Communist Party
- Bulgarian Communist Party – Marxists
- Bulgarian Left
- Bulgarian Social Democratic Party
- Bulgarian Workers' Party (Communist)
- Bulgarian Workers & Peasants Party bg
- Bulgarian Progressive Line
- Nepokorna Bulgaria
- MIR [bg]
- Movement of Non-partisan Candidates [bg]
- My Bulgaria
  - Green Party
  - New Force [bg]
- Party of the Bulgarian Communists
- Party of Bulgarian Social Democrats
- Progressive Bulgaria
  - Progressive Bulgaria
  - Political Movement Social Democrats
  - Social Democratic Party [bg]
  - Our City Movement
  - Stand Up Bulgaria (de facto)
- Union of Communists in Bulgaria
- United Social Democracy [bg]

Burkina Faso

- Burkinabé Party for Refoundation
- Collective of Democratic Mass Organizations and Political Parties
- Congress for Democracy and Progress
- Convergence for Social Democracy
- Convergence of Hope
- Democratic and Popular Rally
- February 14th Group
  - Group of Patriotic Democrats
  - Party for Democracy and Progress / Socialist Party
  - Party for Democracy and Socialism
  - Patriotic Front for Change
  - Union for Rebirth / Sankarist Party
- Movement for Tolerance and Progress
- National Patriots' Party
- New Alliance of Faso
- New Era for Democracy
- Party for Democracy and Socialism/Metba
- Party of Independence, Labour and Justice
- People's Movement for Progress
- Rally for Democracy and Socialism
- Sankarist Democratic Front
- Social Forces Front
- Socialist Alliance
  - Unified Socialist Party
- Voltaic Revolutionary Communist Party

Burundi

- Front for Democracy in Burundi
- Pan Africanist Socialist Movement – Inkinzo

=== C ===
Cambodia

- Beehive Social Democratic Party
- Grassroots Democratic Party
- League for Democracy Party
- Cambodian People's Party (factions)

Cameroon

- Social Democratic Front
- Union of the Peoples of Cameroon

Canada

- BC Ecosocialists
- Bloc Québécois
- Coalition of Progressive Electors
- Communist Party of Canada
  - Communist Party of British Columbia
  - Communist Party of Canada (Manitoba)
  - Communist Party of Canada (Ontario)
  - Communist Party of Canada (Saskatchewan)
  - Communist Party – Alberta
- Communist Party of Canada (Marxist–Leninist)
  - Marxist–Leninist Party of Quebec
- Go Vegan
- Green Party of Alberta
- Green Party of British Columbia
- Green Party of New Brunswick
- Green Party of Ontario
- Green Party of Quebec
- International Socialists
- New Democratic Party
  - Alberta New Democratic Party
  - British Columbia New Democratic Party
  - New Brunswick New Democratic Party
  - New Democratic Party of Manitoba
  - New Democratic Party of Prince Edward Island
  - Newfoundland and Labrador New Democratic Party
  - Nova Scotia New Democratic Party
  - Ontario New Democratic Party
  - Saskatchewan New Democratic Party
  - Yukon New Democratic Party
- New Democratic Party of Quebec
- OneCity Vancouver
- Parti Québécois
- Peoples Political Party, The
- Progressive Conservative Association of Nova Scotia
- Progressive Senate Group
- Projet Montréal
- Québec solidaire
  - Gauche Socialiste
- Socialist Action
- Socialist Alternative
- Socialist Alternative (Quebec)
- Socialist Party of Canada
- Socialist Party of Ontario
- Your Political Party of British Columbia

Cape Verde

- African Party for the Independence of Cape Verde
- Labour and Solidarity Party

Catalonia

- Republican Left of Catalonia
- Socialists' Party of Catalonia
- Pirate Party of Catalonia
- Popular Unity Candidacy
  - Endavant
  - Poble Lliure
- Catalunya en Comú
  - Barcelona en Comú
  - Green Left
- United and Alternative Left
  - Communists of Catalonia
  - Revolutionary Workers' Party
- Left Movement

Cayman Islands

- People's Progressive Movement

Central African Republic

- Central African Democratic Rally
- Movement for the Liberation of the Central African People
- National Convergence "Kwa Na Kwa"
- Patriotic Front for Progress
- Social Democratic Party
- United Hearts Movement

Chad

- Chadian Action for Unity and Socialism
- National Union for Democracy and Renewal
- Socialist Party without Borders

Chile

- Apruebo Dignidad
  - Broad Front
    - Common Force
    - Commons
    - Democratic Revolution
    - Social Convergence
    - Unir Movement
  - Chile Digno
    - Communist Party of Chile
    - Libertarian Left
    - Social Green Regionalist Federation
- Chilean Communist Party (Proletarian Action)
- Liberal Party of Chile (New Social Pact)
- List of the People, The
- New Deal (New Social Pact)
- Non-Neutral Independents
- Party for Democracy (New Social Pact)
- Patriotic Union
- Progressive Party
- Radical Party of Chile (2018)
- Revolutionary Left Movement
- Revolutionary Workers Party
- Socialist Party of Chile (New Social Pact)
- Wallmapuwen

China

- New Democracy Party of China (Banned)
- Maoist Communist Party of China (Banned)
- United Front (Note: The Chinese Communist Party and its satellite parties are also described as left-conservatives and social conservatives, mostly due to its conservative stance on socio-cultural issues.)
  - China Association for Promoting Democracy
  - China Democratic League
  - China National Democratic Construction Association
  - China Zhi Gong Party
  - Chinese Communist Party (factions)
  - Chinese Peasants' and Workers' Democratic Party
  - Jiusan Society
  - Revolutionary Committee of the Chinese Kuomintang
  - Taiwan Democratic Self-Government League
- Zhi Xian Party (Banned)

Colombia

- Colombian Communist Party
- Colombian Communist Party – Maoist
- Colombian Liberal Party
- Communist Party of Colombia (Marxist–Leninist)
- Democratic Unity Party
- Historic Pact for Colombia
  - Alternative Democratic Pole
  - Commons
  - Humane Colombia
  - Patriotic Union
- Independent Social Alliance Movement (Coalition of Hope)
- Indigenous Authorities of Colombia
- Presentes por el Socialismo
- Revolutionary Communist Group of Colombia
- Revolutionary Independent Labour Movement
- Unionist Movement

Comoros

- Convention for the Renewal of the Comoros

Congo, Democratic Republic of the

- Common Front for Congo
  - People's Party for Reconstruction and Democracy
- Heading for Change
  - Union for Democracy and Social Progress
  - Union for the Congolese Nation
- Social Movement for Renewal
- Unified Lumumbist Party

Congo, Republic of the

- Action and Renewal Movement
- Congolese Party of Labour
- Pan-African Union for Social Democracy
- Union for the Republic

Corsica

- Corsica Libera
- Party of the Corsican Nation
- Rinnovu

Costa Rica

- Broad Front
- Citizens' Action Party
- Patriotic Alliance
- Popular Vanguard Party
- Workers' Party

Croatia

- Bandić Milan 365 – Labour and Solidarity Party
- Bosniak Democratic Party of Croatia
- Civic Liberal Alliance (Restart Coalition)
- Croatian Labourists – Labour Party
- Croatian Party of Pensioners
- Croatian Peasant Party
- Croatian Social Democrats
- Croatian Workers Party
- Democratic Alliance of Serbs
- Democrats
- Green Alternative – Sustainable Development of Croatia
- Green–Left Coalition
  - New Left
  - We can!
  - Zagreb is OURS
- Independent Democratic Serb Party
- Istrian Social Democratic Forum
- Left of Croatia
- Lista za Rijeku - Lista per Fiume
- Red Action
- Serb People's Party
- Social Democratic Party of Croatia (Restart Coalition)
- Socialist Labour Party of Croatia
- Workers' Front

Cuba

- Communist Party of Cuba
- Cuban Democratic Socialist Current
- Democratic Social-Revolutionary Party of Cuba

Curaçao

- Partido MAN
- People's Crusade Labour Party
- Sovereign People
- Workers' Liberation Front

Cyprus

- Cyprus Social Ecology Movement
- EDEK Socialist Party
- Jasmine Movement
- LASOK
- Movement of Ecologists – Citizens' Cooperation
- New Cyprus Party
- Progressive Party of Working People
- United Cyprus Party
- Workers' Democracy

Czech Republic

- Social Democracy
- Green Party
- Left, The
- Democratic Party of Greens
- Czech Sovereignty of Social Democracy
- Future
- Socialist Alternative Future
- Socialist Organisation of Working People
- Socialist Solidarity
- Stačilo!
  - Communist Party of Bohemia and Moravia
  - Czech National Social Party

=== D ===
Denmark

- The Alternative
- Communist Party
- Communist Party of Denmark
- Independent Greens
- International Socialists
- Red–Green Alliance
- Social Democrats
- Socialist People's Party
- Workers' Communist Party

Djibouti

- Union for the Presidential Majority
  - Front for the Restoration of Unity and Democracy
  - National Democratic Party
  - People's Rally for Progress
  - Social Democratic People's Party
  - Union of Reform Partisans

Dominica

- Dominica Labour Party

Dominican Republic

- Broad Front
- Civic Renovation Party (Progressive Bloc)
- Communist Party of Labour
- Country Alliance
- Democratic Choice (Alliance for Democracy)
- Green Socialist Party
- International Communist Party
- People's Force
- Revolutionary Social Democratic Party
- Social Democratic Institutional Bloc

=== E ===
Ecuador

- Communist Party of Ecuador
- Communist Party of Ecuador – Red Sun
- Democratic Left
- Pachakutik Plurinational Unity Movement – New Country
- Revolutionary and Democratic Ethical Green Movement
- Popular Unity
  - Marxist–Leninist Communist Party of Ecuador
- Socialist Party – Broad Front of Ecuador
- Union for Hope
  - Citizen Revolution Movement
- Workers' Party of Ecuador

Egypt

- Arab Democratic Nasserist Party (Egypt, National Front Alliance)
- Civil Democratic Movement
  - Bread and Freedom Party
  - Constitution Party
  - Dignity Party (National Front Alliance)
  - Egyptian Social Democratic Party
  - Freedom Egypt Party
  - Socialist Popular Alliance Party
- Egyptian Arab Socialist Party
- Egyptian Communist Party
- Egyptian Green Party
- Egyptian Islamic Labour Party (Anti-Coup Alliance)
- Egyptian Popular Current
- Free Social Constitutional Party
- Homeland Defenders Party (Call of Egypt)
- National Progressive Unionist Party (National Front Alliance)
- Revolutionary Socialists
- Social Justice Party
- Socialist Party of Egypt
- United Nasserist Party
- Workers and Peasants Party
- Workers Democratic Party

El Salvador

- Democratic Change
- Farabundo Martí National Liberation Front

Equatorial Guinea

- Convergence for Social Democracy
- Movement for the Self-Determination of Bioko Island (Banned)

Eritrea

- Eritrean National Salvation Front
- Eritrean People's Democratic Front
- People's Front for Democracy and Justice

Estonia

- Estonian Greens
- Estonian United Left Party
- Social Democratic Party

Eswatini

- Communist Party of Swaziland
- Ngwane National Liberatory Congress
- People's United Democratic Movement
- Swazi Democratic Party

Ethiopia

- Afar Revolutionary Democratic Unity Front
- All-Ethiopia Socialist Movement
- Coalition of Ethiopian Federalist Forces
- Ethiopian People's Revolutionary Party
- Medrek
  - Arena Tigray
- Ogaden National Liberation Front
- Oromo Liberation Front
- Tigray People's Liberation Front (United Front of Ethiopian Federalist and Confederalist Forces)

=== F ===
Faroe Islands

- Republic
- Social Democratic Party (Social Democrats)

Fiji

- Fiji Labour Party

Finland

- Communist Party of Finland
- Communist Workers' Party – For Peace and Socialism (Unregistered)
- Feminist Party
- Green League
- Kansalaisliitto
- Left Alliance
- Social Democratic Party of Finland
- Socialist Alternative

Flanders

- Anticapitalist Left
- Groen
- Left Socialist Party
- Red!
- Vivant
- Vooruit
- Workers' Party of Belgium

France

- Alternative libertaire
- Anarchist Federation
- Ecologist Party
- Ligue trotskyste de France
- Lutte Ouvrière
- Marxist–Leninist Communist Organization – Proletarian Way
- New Popular Front
  - Citizen and Republican Movement
    - Republican and Socialist Left
  - Ensemble!
  - Ecological Revolution for the Living
  - Ecologist Group
    - Ecologists, The
    - Ecology Generation
    - Génération.s
    - L'Après
  - France Insoumise, La
    - Left Party
  - French Communist Party
  - Independent Workers' Party
  - Movement of Progressives
  - New Anticapitalist Party
  - New Deal
  - Socialist Party
- Occitan Party
- Place Publique
- Pole of Communist Revival in France
- Progressives, The
- Radical Party
- Radical Party of the Left
- Revolutionary Left
- Territories of Progress (Ensemble Citoyens)
- Union communiste libertaire
- Workers' Communist Party of France

French Guiana

- Decolonization and Social Emancipation Movement
- Guianese Socialist Party
- Walwari

French Polynesia

- Tahoera'a Huiraatira (Union of Democrats and Independents)
- Tavini Huiraatira (Democratic and Republican Left group)

=== G ===
Gabon

- African Forum for Reconstruction
  - Gabonese Socialist Party
- Gabonese Progress Party
- Social Democratic Party
- Union of the Gabonese People

Gambia, The

- National Convention Party
- People's Democratic Organisation for Independence and Socialism

Georgia

- Communist Party of Georgia
- European Socialists
- For the People
- Georgian Labour Party
- Georgian Troupe
- Intellectuals League of Georgia
- Movement for Social Democracy
- New Communist Party of Georgia
- Social Democrats for the Development of Georgia
- Unified Communist Party of Georgia
- Unity

Germany

- Alliance 90/The Greens
- Association for Solidarity Perspectives
- Bündnis Sahra Wagenknecht
- Communist Party of Germany
- Communist Party of Germany (Roter Morgen)
- Democracy in Motion
- German Communist Party
- Human Environment Animal Protection
- Left, The
  - Socialist Alternative
- Marxist–Leninist Party of Germany
- MERA25
- PARTEI, Die
- Social Democratic Party of Germany
- Ecological-Left Liberal Democratic Party
- Socialist Equality Party
- Workers' Power

Ghana

- Convention People's Party
- Democratic People's Party
- Ghana Union Movement
- National Democratic Congress
- National Democratic Party
- People's National Convention

Gibraltar

- GSLP–Liberal Alliance
  - Gibraltar Socialist Labour Party
- Together Gibraltar

Greece

- Active Citizens
- Antarsya
  - New Left Current
  - Organization of Communist Internationalists of Greece–Spartacus
  - Revolutionary Communist Movement of Greece
  - Socialist Workers' Party
- Christian Democracy
- Communist Organization of Greece
- Communist Party of Greece
- Communist Party of Greece (Marxist–Leninist)
- Communist Renewal
- Course of Freedom
- Democratic Regional Union
- Democratic Social Movement
- Ecologist Greens
- Fighting Socialist Party of Greece
- Free Citizens
- Greens - Solidarity
- Internationalist Workers' Left
- Kosmos
- Marxist–Leninist Communist Party of Greece
- MeRA25
- Movement for Change
  - Movement of Democratic Socialists
  - PASOK
    - Agreement for the New Greece
- Movement for the Reorganization of the Communist Party of Greece 1918–1955
- New Left
- Organization for the Reconstruction of the Communist Party of Greece
- Organisation of Internationalist Communists of Greece
- Panhellenic Citizen Chariot
- Popular Unions of Bipartisan Social Groups
- Popular Unity
  - I Don't Pay Movement
  - Left Anti-capitalist Group
  - Left Recomposition
  - New Fighter
- Social Agreement
- Syriza
  - Democratic Left
  - Movement for the Unity of Action of the Left
  - Radicals
  - ROZA
  - Society First
- Workers Revolutionary Party

Greenland

- Inuit Ataqatigiit
- Nunatta Qitornai
- Siumut (Social Democrats)

Grenada

- Grenada United Labour Party
- National Democratic Congress

Guadeloupe

- Guadeloupe Communist Party

Guatemala

- Guatemalan National Revolutionary Unity
- Movement for the Liberation of Peoples
- National Unity of Hope
- Semilla
- Winaq

Guinea

- Democratic Party of Guinea – African Democratic Rally
- Rally of the Guinean People

Guinea-Bissau

- African Party for the Independence of Guinea and Cape Verde
- Madem G15
- Party for Social Renewal
- Socialist Party of Guinea-Bissau
- United Social Democratic Party
- Workers' Party

Guyana

- A Partnership for National Unity
  - Guyana Action Party
  - People's National Congress
  - Working People's Alliance
- People's Progressive Party

=== H ===
Haiti

- Fanmi Lavalas
- Fusion of Haitian Social Democrats (Coalition of Progressive Parliamentarians)
- Struggling People's Organization (Coalition of Progressive Parliamentarians)

Honduras

- Communist Party of Honduras
- Democratic Unification Party
- FAPER
- Innovation and Unity Party
- Liberty and Refoundation

Hong Kong

- April Fifth Action (Pro-democracy camp)
- Civic Act-up (Pro-democracy camp)
- The Frontier (Pro-democracy camp)
- Hong Kong Association for Democracy and People's Livelihood (Pro-democracy camp)
- Hong Kong Federation of Trade Unions (Pro-Beijing camp)
- Labour Party (Pro-democracy camp)
- Land Justice League (Pro-democracy camp)
- League of Social Democrats (Pro-democracy camp)
- Neighbourhood and Worker's Service Centre (Pro-democracy camp)
- People Power (Pro-democracy camp)
- Revolutionary Communist Party of China (Pro-democracy camp)
- Socialist Action (Pro-democracy camp)

Hungary

- Democratic Coalition
- Dialogue – The Greens' Party
- Hungarian Social Green Party
- Hungarian Socialist Party
- Hungarian Socialist Workers' Party
- Hungarian Workers' Party
- LMP – Hungary's Green Party
- Social Democratic Party of Hungary
- Spark Movement
- Táncsics – Radical Left Party
- Tisza Party
- Workers' Party of Hungary 2006 – European Left
- Yes Solidarity for Hungary Movement

=== I ===
Iceland

- Humanist Party
- Icelandic Socialist Party
- Left-Green Movement
- People's Front of Iceland
- Rainbow
- Social Democratic Alliance

India

- All India Anna Dravida Munnetra Kazhagam
- Dravidar Kazhagam
- Dravida Munnetra Kazhagam
- Indian National Congress
- All India Forward Bloc
- Bahujan Samaj Party
- Bharatiya Minorities Suraksha Mahasangh
- Communist Party of India
- Communist Party of India (Maoist)
- Communist Party of India (Marxist)
- Communist Party of India (Marxist–Leninist) Liberation
- Janata Dal (Secular)
- Janata Dal (United)
- Janganotantrik Morcha
- Janta Congress Chhattisgarh
- Kangleipak Communist Party
- Loktantrik Janata Dal
- Maoist Communist Party of Manipur
- Marumalarchi Dravida Munnetra Kazhagam
- Pragatisheel Samajwadi Party (Lohiya)
- Rashtriya Janata Dal
- Revolutionary Communist Party of India
- Revolutionary Socialist Party
- Samajwadi Party
- Sikkim Democratic Front
- Socialist Party (India)
- Socialist Unity Centre of India (Communist)
- Tamilaga Vettri Kazhagam
- Tamil Maanila Congress
- Trinamool Congress
- Viduthalai Chiruthaigal Katchi
- Vikassheel Insaan Party

Indonesia

- Indonesian Democratic Party of Struggle
- Indonesian Green Party
- Indonesian Solidarity Party
- Labour Party
- NasDem Party

Iran

Will of the Iranian Nation Party

- Assembly of the Forces of Imam's Line (Council for Coordinating the Reforms Front (Iranian Reformists))
- Communist Party of Iran
- Communist Party of Iran (Marxist–Leninist–Maoist)
- Council of Nationalist-Religious Activists of Iran (Iranian dissidents)
- Democratic Party of Iranian Kurdistan (Congress of Nationalities for a Federal Iran)
- Fedaian Organisation (Minority)
- Islamic Association of Teachers of Iran (Council for Coordinating the Reforms Front (Iranian Reformists))
- Iran Party (National Front (Iranian dissidents))
- Iranian People's Fedai Guerrillas
- Islamic Iran Solidarity Party (Council for Coordinating the Reforms Front (Iranian Reformists))
- Komala Party of Iranian Kurdistan (Congress of Nationalities for a Federal Iran)
- Komalah (CPI)
- Kurdistan Democratic Party
- Kurdistan Free Life Party
- Laborers' Party of Iran
- Labour Party of Iran (Toufan)
- Mojahedin of the Islamic Revolution of Iran Organization (Council for Coordinating the Reforms Front (Iranian Reformists))
- NEDA Party (Iranian Reformists)
- Office for Strengthening Unity (Council for Coordinating the Reforms Front (Iranian Reformists))
- Organization of Iranian People's Fedai Guerrillas
- Organization of Iranian People's Fedai Guerrillas – Followers of the Identity Platform
- Organization of Iranian People's Fedaian (Majority)
- Southern Azerbaijan National Awakening Movement (Congress of Nationalities for a Federal Iran)
- Tudeh Party of Iran
- Union of People's Fedaian of Iran
- Worker House (Council for Coordinating the Reforms Front (Iranian Reformists))
- Worker-communist Party of Iran
- Worker-communist Party of Iran – Hekmatist
- Worker's Way
- Workers Left Unity – Iran

Iraq

- Arab Socialist Ba'ath Party – Iraq Region
- Arab Revolutionary Workers Party (National Democratic Rally)
- Assyrian Socialist Party
- Civil Democratic Alliance
  - National Democratic Party
- Communist Party of Kurdistan – Iraq (Kurdistan List)
- Iraqi Communist Party (Alliance Towards Reforms)
- Iraqi National Accord (Al-Wataniya)
- Kurdistan Democratic Solution Party
- Kurdistan Socialist Democratic Party
- Kurdistan Toilers' Party
- Kurdistan Workers' Party
- Left Worker-communist Party of Iraq
- Nasserist Socialist Vanguard Party
- Patriotic Union of Kurdistan (Kurdistani Coalition)
- Popular Unity Party
- Worker-communist Party of Iraq
- Worker-communist Party of Kurdistan

Ireland

- 32 County Sovereignty Movement
- Communist Party of Ireland
- Éirígí
- Fís Nua
- Green Party
- Independent Left
- Independents 4 Change
- Irish Republican Socialist Party
- Irish Socialist Network
- Kerry Independent Alliance
- Labour Party
- People Before Profit–Solidarity
  - People Before Profit
    - Socialist Workers Network
    - RISE
  - Solidarity
    - Socialist Party
      - Cross-Community Labour Alternative
- Rabharta
- Republican Network for Unity
- Republican Sinn Féin
- Right to Change
- Saoradh
- Sinn Féin
- Social Democratic and Labour Party
- Socialist Democracy
- Social Democrats
- Workers and Unemployed Action
- Workers' Party

Israel

- Arab Democratic Party (Joint List)
- Balad (Joint List)
- Da'am Workers Party
- Green Party
- Hadash (Joint List)
  - Maki
- Ihud Bnei HaBrit
- Israeli Labor Party
  - Habonim Dror
  - HaNoar HaOved VeHaLomed
- Meimad
- Meretz
  - Hashomer Hatzair
  - Meretz Youth
  - Young Meretz
- Socialist Struggle Movement
- The Democrats (Israel)
- U'Bizchutan

Italy

- Anticapitalist Left
- Centre-left coalition
  - Democratic Party
  - Five Star Movement
  - Greens and Left Alliance
    - Green Europe
    - Greens of South Tyrol
    - Italian Left
    - Possible
    - Progressive Party
  - Italian Socialist Party
  - Solidary Democracy
- Communist Alternative Party
- Communist Party
- Democratic Party – Democratic and Progressive Italy
- Democracy and Autonomy
- Fatherland and Constitution
- Italia in Comune
- Italian Communist Party
- Italian Marxist–Leninist Party
- Italia Viva
- Peace Land Dignity
  - August 24th Movement
  - Communist Refoundation Party
  - MERA25 Italia
- Power to the People
- Social Democracy
  - Sicilian Socialist Party
- Workers' Communist Party

Ivory Coast

- Ivorian Popular Front
- Ivorian Workers' Party
- People's Socialist Union
- Revolutionary Communist Party of Ivory Coast

=== J ===
Jamaica

- Marcus Garvey People's Political Party
- People's National Party

Japan

- Greens Japan
- Japan Revolutionary Communist League
- Japan Revolutionary Communist League (Revolutionary Marxist Faction)
- Japanese Communist Party
- Japanese Communist Party (Action Faction)
- Japanese Communist Party (Left Faction)
- New Socialist Party of Japan
- Okinawa Social Mass Party
- Reiwa Shinsengumi
- Revolutionary Communist League, National Committee
- Social Democratic Party

Jersey

- Reform Jersey

Jordan

- Civil Alliance Party
- Jordanian Communist Party
- Jordanian Democratic People's Party
- Jordanian Democratic Popular Unity Party
- Ma'an List

=== K ===
Kazakhstan

- Auyl People's Democratic Patriotic Party
- Communist Party of Kazakhstan
- People's Party of Kazakhstan
- Nationwide Social Democratic Party
- Socialist Resistance of Kazakhstan

Kenya

- Communist Party of Kenya
- Madaraka People's Movement
- National Super Alliance
  - Chama Cha Uzalendo
  - Forum for the Restoration of Democracy – Kenya
  - Muungano Party
  - Orange Democratic Movement
  - Wiper Democratic Movement – Kenya
- Safina

Kosovo

- Green Party of Kosovo
- Movement for Unification
- Social Democratic Initiative
- Social Democratic Party of Kosovo
- Social Democratic Union
- Vetëvendosje

Kuwait

- Kuwait Democratic Forum
- Kuwaiti Progressive Movement

Kyrgyzstan

- Ata Meken Socialist Party
- Communist Party of Kyrgyzstan
- Party of Communists of Kyrgyzstan
- Social Democrats (Kyrgyzstan)
- Social Democratic Party of Kyrgyzstan

=== L ===
Laos

- Lao People's Revolutionary Party

Latvia

- Latvian Russian Union
- Latvian Social Democratic Workers' Party
- New Harmony
- Progressives, The
- Social Democratic Party "Harmony"
- Socialist Party of Latvia

Lebanon

- Al-Mourabitoun (March 8 Alliance)
- Arab Democratic Party (March 8 Alliance)
- Arab Socialist Movement
- Armenian Revolutionary Federation in Lebanon (March 8 Alliance)
- Citizens in a State
- Communist Action Organization in Lebanon
- Democratic Left Movement (March 14 Alliance)
- Lebanese Communist Party
- Lebanese Social Democratic Party
- Nasserist Unionists Movement (March 8 Alliance)
- People's Movement (March 8 Alliance)
- Popular Nasserist Organization (March 8 Alliance)
- Progressive Socialist Party
- Revolutionary Communist Group
- Social Democrat Hunchakian Party (March 14 Alliance)
- Solidarity Party (March 8 Alliance)
- Syrian Social Nationalist Party in Lebanon (March 8 Alliance)
- Toilers League (March 8 Alliance)
- Union Party (March 8 Alliance)

Lesotho

- Alliance of Democrats (Lesotho)
- Basotho Action Party
- Basutoland Congress Party
- Communist Party of Lesotho
- Democratic Congress
- Lesotho People's Congress
- Lesotho Congress for Democracy
- Lesotho Workers' Party
- Popular Front for Democracy
- Socialist Revolutionaries (Lesotho)

Liberia

- Liberian People's Party
- National Democratic Coalition
- United People's Party

Libya

- Libyan National Movement
- Libyan Popular National Movement
- National Front Party

Liechtenstein

- Free List

Lithuania

- KArtu
- Lithuanian People's Party
- Lithuanian Regions Party
- Social Democratic Party of Lithuania
- Socialist People's Front

Luxembourg

- Communist Party of Luxembourg
- Greens, The
- Left, The
- Luxembourg Socialist Workers' Party

=== M ===
Madagascar

- Congress Party for the Independence of Madagascar
- Madagascar Green Party
- Malagasy Revolutionary Party
- Social Democratic Party of Madagascar
- Young Malagasies Determined

Malawi

- Alliance for Democracy

Malaysia

- Democratic Action Party
- Parti Rakyat Malaysia
- Socialist Alternative
- Socialist Party of Malaysia

Mali

- African Solidarity for Democracy and Independence
- Alliance for Democracy in Mali
- Rally for Mali

Malta

- AD+PD
- Labour Party

Isle of Man

- Manx Labour Party
- Mec Vannin

Martinique

- Martinican Communist Party
- Martinican Independence Movement
- Martinican Progressive Party

Mauritania

- Alliance for Justice and Democracy/Movement for Renewal
- People's Progressive Alliance
- Rally of Democratic Forces

Mauritius

- Labour Party
- Lalit
- Mauritian Militant Movement
- Militant Socialist Movement
- Muvman Liberater
- Parti Malin
- Plateforme Militante
- Reform Party
- Rodrigues Movement
- Rodrigues People's Organisation

Mexico

- Citizens' Movement
- Coalition of Workers, Peasants, and Students of the Isthmus
- Communist Party of Mexico
- Communist Party of Mexico (Marxist–Leninist)
- Communists' Party
- Ecologist Green Party of Mexico
- Labor Party
- Morena
- Party of the Democratic Revolution
- Popular Socialist Party
- Popular Socialist Party of Mexico
- Progressive Party of Coahuila
- Socialist Party of Mexico
- Socialist Unity League
- Socialist Workers Movement

Moldova

- Alternative (factions)
  - Common Action Party – Civil Congress
  - National Alternative Movement
- Agrarian Party of Moldova
- Centrist Union of Moldova
- Ecologist Green Party
- European Social Democratic Party
- Party of Regions of Moldova
- Patriotic Electoral Bloc
  - Future of Moldova Party
  - Heart of Moldova Party
  - Party of Communists of the Republic of Moldova
  - Party of Socialists of the Republic of Moldova
- People's Party of the Republic of Moldova
- Socialist Party of Moldova
- Working People's Party

Mongolia

- Mongolian Green Party
- Mongolian People's Party
- Mongolian Social Democratic Party
- Motherland Party
- Right Person Electorate Coalition

Montenegro

- New Left
- Social Democratic Party of Montenegro
- Social Democrats of Montenegro
- United Reform Action (In Black and White)
- Yugoslav Communist Party of Montenegro

Morocco

- Action Party
- Authenticity and Modernity Party
- Democratic Way
- Federation of the Democratic Left
- Front of Democratic Forces
- National Ittihadi Congress
- Party of Progress and Socialism
- Socialist Democratic Vanguard Party
- Socialist Union of Popular Forces
- Unified Socialist Party

Mozambique

- FRELIMO
- Optimist Party for the Development of Mozambique

Myanmar

- Communist Party of Burma
- Democratic Party for a New Society
- National League for Democracy
- National Unity Party
- Shan Nationalities League for Democracy
- United Wa State Party

=== N ===
Namibia

- Affirmative Repositioning
- All People's Party
- Congress of Democrats
- Landless People's Movement
- Namibian Economic Freedom Fighters
- Rally for Democracy and Progress
- SWANU
- SWAPO
- Workers Revolutionary Party

Nepal
Major parties

- Communist Party of Nepal (Maoist Centre)
- Communist Party of Nepal (Marxist–Leninist)
- Communist Party of Nepal (Unified Marxist–Leninist)
- Communist Party of Nepal (Unified Socialist)
- Minor parties
- Communist Party of Nepal
- Minor parties
- Jana Jagaran Party Nepal
- Khambuwan Rashtriya Morcha, Nepal
- Lokdal
- Madhesi Janadhikar Forum Madhesh
- Nepali Congress
- Nepal Samajbadi Party (Lohiyabadi)
- Nepal Samajwadi Janata Dal
- Nepal Sukumbasi Party (Loktantrik)
- Nepal Workers Peasants Party
- Nepali Jantantra Party
- People's Socialist Party, Nepal (2020)
- Rastriya Jana Ekta Party
- Rastriya Janamorcha
- Rastriya Janamukti Party
- Rastriya Janata Dal Nepal
- Sanghiya Loktantrik Rastriya Manch

Netherlands

- Bij1
- Communist Party of the Netherlands
- Democrats 66
- Denk
- Group of Marxist–Leninists/Red Dawn
- International Socialists
- Party for the Animals
- Peace for Animals
- Political Party for Basic Income
- Progressief Nederland
- Revolutionary Socialist Party
- Socialist Alternative Politics
- Socialist Party
- The Greens
- Ubuntu Connected Front
- United Communist Party
- Water Natuurlijk

New Caledonia

- Caledonian Union
- Kanak Socialist Liberation
- Kanak and Socialist National Liberation Front
- Labour Party
- Party of Kanak Liberation
- Renewed Caledonian Union

New Zealand

- Alliance
- Communist League
- Green Party of Aotearoa New Zealand
- Mana Movement
- New Zealand Labour Party
- Social Credit Party
- Socialist Aotearoa
- Te Pāti Māori
- Workers Party of New Zealand

Nicaragua

- Communist Party of Nicaragua
- Marxist–Leninist Popular Action Movement
- Nicaraguan Socialist Party
- Sandinista National Liberation Front
- Sandinista Renovation Movement

Niger

- Nigerien Party for Democracy and Socialism
- Party for Socialism and Democracy in Niger
- Sawaba
- Social Democratic Party
- Social Democratic Rally

Nigeria

- African Action Congress
- All Progressives Congress
- Communist Party of Nigeria
- Labour Party
- Social Democratic Party
- Socialist Party of Nigeria
  - Democratic Socialist Movement

North Korea

- Chondoist Chongu Party
- Korean Social Democratic Party
- Workers' Party of Korea (Disputed)

North Macedonia

- Communist Party of Macedonia
- Democratic Union for Integration
- Left, The
- Party of United Democrats of Macedonia (VMRO-DPMNE)
- Social Democratic Party of Macedonia
- Social Democratic Union of Macedonia
  - New Social Democratic Party
- Socialist Party of Macedonia (VMRO-DPMNE)
- Union of Tito's Left Forces

Northern Cyprus

- Communal Democracy Party
- Communal Liberation Party New Forces
- Republican Turkish Party

Northern Mariana Islands

- Democratic Party

Norway

- Communist Party of Norway
- Green Party
- Labour Party
- Red Party
- Socialist Left Party

=== P ===
Pakistan

- Awami National Party
- Awami Tahreek
- Awami Workers Party
- Baloch Republican Party
- Balochistan National Party (Mengal)
- Barabri Party Pakistan
- Communist Party of Pakistan
- Communist Party of Pakistan (Thaheem)
- Hazara Democratic Party
- Jamhoori Wattan Party
- Mazdoor Kisan Party
- Muttahida Qaumi Movement
- National Democratic Movement
- National Party
- Pak Sarzameen Party
- Pakistan Peoples Party
- Pakistan Peoples Party Workers
- Pakistan Peoples Party (Shaheed Bhutto)
- Qaumi Watan Party
- Shia Ulema Council
- Sindh Taraqi Pasand Party
- Socialist Movement Pakistan

Palestine

- Palestine Liberation Organization
  - Democratic Front for the Liberation of Palestine
  - Fatah
  - Palestinian Arab Front
  - Palestinian Democratic Union
  - Palestinian Liberation Front
  - Palestinian People's Party
  - Palestinian Popular Struggle Front
  - Popular Front for the Liberation of Palestine
- Palestinian Communist Party
- Palestinian National Initiative
- Revolutionary Palestinian Communist Party
- Socialist Struggle Movement

Panama

- Broad Front for Democracy
- Democratic Revolutionary Party
- People's Party of Panama

Papua New Guinea

- Papua New Guinea Greens
- People's Labour Party
- Social Democratic Party

Paraguay

- Christian Democratic Party
- Great Renewed National Alliance
- Guasú Front
- National Encounter Party
- Paraguayan Communist Party
- Partido Patria Libre
- Party for a Country of Solidarity
- Progressive Democratic Party
- Revolutionary Febrerista Party
- Tekojoja People's Party
- Workers' Party

Peru

- Broad Front
  - Communist Party of Peru – Red Fatherland
  - Peruvian Communist Party
  - Socialist Party
- Communist Party of Peru (Marxist–Leninist)
- Direct Democracy
- Free Peru
- National United Renaissance
- Peruvian Nationalist Party
- Revolutionary Socialist Party
- Shining Path
- Socialist Workers Party
- Socialist Workers Party (1992)
- Together for Peru

Philippines

- Akbayan
- Aksyon Demokratiko
- Bayan Muna
- Communist Party of the Philippines
- Gabriela Women's Party
- Labor Party Philippines
- Liberal Party of the Philippines
- Partido Komunista ng Pilipinas-1930
- Partido Lakas ng Masa
- PDP–Laban
- People's Reform Party
- Philippine Democratic Socialist Party
- Philippine Green Republican Party
- Pwersa ng Masang Pilipino
- Revolutionary Workers' Party
- Sanlakas

Poland

- Better Poland
- Democratic Left Alliance
- Feminist Initiative
- Freedom and Equality
- Greens, The (Civic Coalition)
- Left, The
  - Labour Union
  - New Left
  - Polish Socialist Party
- Partia Razem
- National Party of Retirees and Pensioners
- Polish Communist Party
- Polish Initiative (Civic Coalition)
- Polish Labour Party - August 80
- Polish Left
- Self-Defence of the Republic of Poland
- Social Democracy of Poland
- Socialist Alternative
- Workers' Democracy
- Your Movement

Portugal

- Left Bloc
- LIVRE
- People Animals Nature
- Portuguese Labour Party
- Portuguese Workers' Communist Party
- Socialist Alternative Movement
- Socialist Party
- Together for the People
- Unitary Democratic Coalition
  - Ecologist Party "The Greens"
  - Portuguese Communist Party
- Workers' Party of Socialist Unity

Puerto Rico

- Hostosian National Independence Movement
- Movimiento Unión Soberanista
- Movimiento Victoria Ciudadana
- Puerto Rican Communist Party
- Puerto Rican Independence Party
- Puerto Rican Workers' Revolutionary Party
- Puerto Ricans for Puerto Rico Party
- Socialist Front
- Workers' Socialist Movement
- Working People's Party

=== Q ===
Québec

- Parti Québécois
- Québec solidaire
- Option nationale
- Socialist Alternative

=== R ===
Réunion

- Communist Party of Réunion
- Democratic and Republican Left
- La France Insoumise – New Popular Front
- Socialists (parliamentary group)

Rojava

- Assyrian Democratic Organization
- Democratic Socialist Arab Ba'ath Party
- Honor and Rights Convention
- Kongreya Star
- Democratic Union Party (TEV-DEM)
- Syrian National Democratic Alliance

Romania

- Communitarian Party of Romania
- Democracy and Solidarity Party
- Green Party
- National Union for the Progress of Romania
- Party of the Roma
- PRO Romania
- Romanian Socialist Party
- Social Democratic Party
- Social Liberal Humanist Party

Russia

- A Just Russia
- All-Union Communist Party (Bolsheviks)
- All-Union Communist Party of Bolsheviks
- Civilian Power
- Communist Party of Social Justice
- Communist Party of the Russian Federation
- Communists of Russia
- Green Alternative
- Labour Russia
- Left Front
  - Russian Communist Workers' Party of the Communist Party of the Soviet Union
  - Vanguard of Red Youth
- Party of Business
- Party of Peace and Unity
- Party of Russia's Rebirth
- Party of the Dictatorship of the Proletariat
- Pyotr Alexeyev' Resistance Movement
- Revolutionary Workers' Party
- Russian Maoist Party
- Russian Socialist Movement
- Russian United Labour Front
- Socialist Alternative

=== S ===
Saba

- Saba Labour Party

Saint Kitts and Nevis

- Saint Kitts and Nevis Labour Party

Saint Lucia

- Saint Lucia Labour Party

Saint Vincent and the Grenadines

- Unity Labour Party

San Marino

- Party of Socialists and Democrats
- Active Citizenship
  - United Left
  - Civic 10

São Tomé and Príncipe

- MLSTP/PSD

Saudi Arabia

- Arab Socialist Action Party – Arabian Peninsula

Scotland

- Scottish National Party
- Scottish Labour Party
- Scottish Socialist Party
- Scottish Green Party
- Solidarity
- Socialist Party Scotland
- Communist Party of Scotland

Senegal

- Socialist Party of Senegal,
- Party of Independence and Labor
- And-Jëf/African Party for Democracy and Socialism
- Authentic Socialist Party
- African Independence Party – Renewal
- Social Democratic Party/Jant Bi

Serbia

- Communist Party
- Democratic Party
- Green–Left Front
- Greens of Serbia
- League of Social Democrats of Vojvodina
- Movement of Socialists
- New Communist Party of Yugoslavia
- Party of Freedom and Justice
- Party of Labour
- Party of United Pensioners of Serbia
- Reformists of Vojvodina
- Social Democracy
- Social Democratic Party
- Social Democratic Party of Serbia
- Social Democratic Union
- Socialist Party of Serbia
- Socialist People's Party
- Student List
- Together for Serbia

Seychelles

- People's Party

Singapore

- Workers' Party of Singapore
- Socialist Front

Slovakia

- Direction – Social Democracy
- Voice – Social Democracy
- Communist Party of Slovakia
- 99 Percent – Civic Voice
- Socialists.sk

Slovenia

- Freedom Movement
- Left, The
- Social Democrats
- Vesna – Green Party

Solomon Islands

- Solomon Islands Labour Party

Somaliland

- Peace, Unity, and Development Party
- For Justice and Development
- Wadani

South Africa

- African National Congress (Tripartite Alliance)
- African People's Convention
- Azanian People's Organisation
- Black First Land First
- Democratic Left Front
- Democratic Socialist Movement
- Economic Freedom Fighters
- Keep Left
- Pan Africanist Congress of Azania
- Socialist Party of Azania
- South African Communist Party (Tripartite Alliance)
- Workers and Socialist Party
- Workers International Vanguard League
- Zabalaza Anarchist Communist Front

South Korea

- Democratic Party (South Korea, 2015)
- Green Party Korea
- Justice Party
- Labor Party
- Mirae Party
- Progressive Party

South Ossetia

- Communist Party of South Ossetia

South Sudan

- Communist Party of South Sudan

Spain

- Actúa
- Carlist Party
- EH Bildu
- For a Fairer World
- Podemos
- Popular Unity Candidacy
- Spanish Socialist Workers' Party
  - Socialists' Party of Catalonia
- Sumar
  - Catalunya en Comú
  - Coalició Compromís
  - Greens Equo
  - Más Madrid
  - United Left
    - Communist Party of Spain
    - Republican Left
    - Revolutionary Workers' Party
    - Unitarian Candidacy of Workers
- Revolutionary Socialism
- Republican Alternative
- Republican Left of Catalonia
- Zero Cuts

Sri Lanka

- Janatha Vimukthi Peramuna
- Lanka Sama Samaja Party
- National People's Power
- Sri Lanka Freedom Party
- Tamil National Alliance

Sudan

- Arab Socialist Ba'ath Party – Organization of Sudan
- Arab Socialist Ba'ath Party – Region of Sudan
- Islamic Socialist Party
- Sudanese Ba'ath Party
- Sudanese Communist Party
- Sudanese Socialist Union

Suriname

- National Democratic Party
- Surinamese Labour Party

Sweden

- Feminist Initiative
- Communist League
- Communist Party
- Communist Party Of Sweden
- Green Party
- Left Party
- Socialist Party
- Socialist Justice Party
- Swedish Social Democratic Party
- Örebro Party

Switzerland

- Alternative Left
- Alternative List
- Communist Party
- Green Party of Switzerland
- Social Democratic Party of Switzerland
- Solidarity
- Swiss Party of Labour

Syria

- National Coordination Committee for Democratic Change
  - Democratic Union Party
  - National Democratic Rally
    - Syrian Democratic People's Party
    - Arab Revolutionary Workers Party
    - Arab Socialist Movement
    - Communist Labour Party
    - Democratic Arab Socialist Union
    - Democratic Socialist Arab Ba'ath

=== T ===
Republic of China (Taiwan)

- Pan-Green Coalition
  - Democratic Progressive Party
  - New Power Party
  - Taiwan Statebuilding Party
  - Taiwan Solidarity Union
- Green Party Taiwan
- Labor Party
- Social Democratic Party (Taiwan)
- Taiwan Communist Party

Tajikistan

- Communist Party of Tajikistan

Tanzania

- Chama Cha Mapinduzi
- Tanzania Labour Party

Thailand

- Move Forward Party
- New Democracy Party (Thailand)
- People's Party

Timor-Leste

- Christian Democratic Party
- Frenti-Mudança
- Fretilin
- National Congress for Timorese Reconstruction
- Socialist Party of Timor

Togo

- Workers' Party
- Communist Party of Togo

Transnistria

- Transnistrian Communist Party
- Proriv

Trinidad and Tobago

- People's Empowerment Party
- Congress of the People
- United National Congress
- Movement for Social Justice
- Progressive Party

Tunisia

- Congress for the Republic
- Democratic Current
- Democratic Forum for Labour and Liberties
- Democratic Patriots' Unified Party (Popular Front)
- Green Tunisia Party
- Movement of Socialist Democrats
- Nidaa Tounes
- People's Movement
- Popular Unity Movement
- Social Democratic Path (Union for Tunisia)
- Socialist Party
- Tunisian Ba'ath Movement (Popular Front)
- Unionist Democratic Union
- Wafa Movement
- Workers' Left League (Popular Front)
- Workers' Party (Popular Front)

Turkey

- Bolshevik Party (North Kurdistan – Turkey)
- Communist Labour Party of Turkey
- Communist Party of Kurdistan
- Communist Party of Turkey
- Communist Party of Turkey (Workers Voice)
- Communist Party of Turkey/Marxist–Leninist (Maoist Party Centre)
- Communist Revolution Movement/Leninist
- Communist Workers Party of Turkey
- Democratic Left Party
- Freedom and Socialism Party
- Movement for Change in Turkey
- National Party
- Patriotic Party
- People's Ascent Party
- Peoples' Democratic Congress
  - Democratic Regions Party
  - Green Left Party
  - Labour Party
  - Peoples' Democratic Party
  - Revolutionary Socialist Workers' Party
  - Socialist Democracy Party
  - Socialist Party of the Oppressed
  - Socialist Refoundation Party
- People's Liberation Party
- Peoples' United Revolutionary Movement
  - Communist Labour Party of Turkey/Leninist
  - Communist Party of Turkey/Marxist–Leninist
  - Devrimci Karargâh
  - Kurdistan Workers' Party
  - Maoist Communist Party
  - Marxist–Leninist Armed Propaganda Unit
  - Marxist–Leninist Communist Party
- Republican People's Party
- Revolutionary Communist Party of Turkey
- Revolutionary Party of Kurdistan
- Revolutionary People's Liberation Party/Front
- Revolutionary People's Party (illegal)
- Revolutionary People's Party (legal)
- Revolutionary Workers' Party
- Social Democratic People's Party
- Socialist Democratic Party
- Socialist Liberation Party
- Socialist Republican Party
- Socialist Workers' Party of Turkey
- United June Movement
  - Communist Movement of Turkey
  - Communist Party
  - Freedom and Solidarity Party
    - New Way
  - Labourist Movement Party
  - People's Communist Party of Turkey
- Women's Party
- Workers' Fraternity Party

Turkmenistan

- Agrarian Party of Turkmenistan
- Communist Party of Turkmenistan
- Democratic Party of Turkmenistan
- Party of Industrialists and Entrepreneurs of Turkmenistan

=== U ===
Ukraine

- Batkivshchyna
- Communist Party of Ukraine
- Democratic Party of Ukraine
- Justice Party
- Party of Greens of Ukraine
- Peasant Party of Ukraine
- Platform for Life and Peace
- Radical Party of Oleh Liashko
- Social Movement
- Socialist Party of Ukraine

United Kingdom

- Communist Party of Britain
- Communist Party of Great Britain (Provisional Central Committee)
- Communist Party of Great Britain (Marxist-Leninist)
- Co-operative Party
- Cross-Community Labour Alternative
- Green Party of England and Wales
- International Socialist Network
- Left Unity
- Labour Party (UK)
- Liberal Democrats (UK)
- Mebyon Kernow
- National Health Action Party
- No2EU
- Plaid Cymru
- Respect Party
- Scottish National Party
- Sinn Féin
- Social Democratic and Labour Party
- Socialist Party of Great Britain
- Socialist Party (Ireland)
- Socialist Resistance
- Socialist Workers Party
- Socialist Labour Party
- Social Justice Party
- Trade Unionist and Socialist Coalition
  - Socialist Party (England and Wales)
  - Socialist Party Scotland
- Transform Party
- Workers Power
- Workers' Party (Ireland)
- Workers Party of Britain
- Your Party (UK)

United States

- African People's Socialist Party
- All-African People's Revolutionary Party
- American Communist Party
- Black Riders Liberation Party
- California National Party
- Committees of Correspondence for Democracy and Socialism
- Communist Party USA
- Communist Party USA (Provisional)
- Democratic Socialists of America
- Freedom Road Socialist Organization
- Freedom Socialist Party
- Green Party of the United States
  - D.C. Statehood Green Party
  - Green-Rainbow Party
- Greens/Green Party USA
- International Socialist Organization
- International Workers Party
- Justice Party
- League for the Revolutionary Party
- Legal Marijuana Now Party
- Liberal Party of New York
- Liberty Union Party
- Movement for a People's Party
- Natural Law Party
- New Afrikan Black Panther Party
- Oregon Progressive Party
- Party for Socialism and Liberation
- Peace and Freedom Party
- Progressive Labor Party
- Revolutionary Communists of America
- Revolutionary Communist Party, USA
- Revolutionary Workers League
- Social Democrats, USA
- Socialist Action
- Socialist Alternative
- Socialist Equality Party
- Socialist Labor Party of America
- Socialist Party USA
- Socialist Workers Party
- Solidarity
- Spark
- Spartacist League
- U.S. Marxist–Leninist Organization
- Vermont Progressive Party
- Women's Equality Party
- Workers World Party
- Working Families Party
- World Socialist Party of the United States

Uruguay

- Frente Amplio
  - Socialist Party of Uruguay
  - Communist Party of Uruguay
  - Movement of Popular Participation
    - Tupamaro National Liberation Movement
  - Christian Democratic Party of Uruguay
  - New Space
  - Vertiente Artiguista
  - Party of the Communes
  - Broad Front Confluence
  - Progressive Alliance
  - Partido por la Victoria del Pueblo
- Popular Assembly
  - March 26 Movement

Uzbekistan

- People's Democratic Party of Uzbekistan
- Justice Social Democratic Party
- Ecological Movement of Uzbekistan
- Uzbekistan Liberal Democratic Party

=== V ===
Venezuela

- A New Era (Democratic Unity Roundtable)
- Alliance for Change (Great Patriotic Pole)
- Communist Party of Venezuela (Great Patriotic Pole)
- Democratic Action (Democratic Unity Roundtable)
- Democratic Republican Union
- Fatherland for All (Great Patriotic Pole)
- Fearless People's Alliance (Democratic Unity Roundtable)
- For Social Democracy (Great Patriotic Pole)
- Internationalism
- Justice First (Democratic Unity Roundtable)
- Marxist–Leninist Communist Party of Venezuela
- Movement for a Responsible, Sustainable and Entrepreneurial Venezuela (Democratic Unity Roundtable)
- Movement for Socialism (Democratic Unity Roundtable)
- New Revolutionary Road (Great Patriotic Pole)
- Organized Socialist Party in Venezuela (Great Patriotic Pole)
- People's Electoral Movement (Great Patriotic Pole)
- Popular Will (Democratic Unity Roundtable)
- Progressive Advance (Democratic Unity Roundtable)
- Radical Cause (Democratic Unity Roundtable)
- Red Flag Party
- Revolutionary Middle Class
- Revolutionary Socialism
- Tupamaro (Great Patriotic Pole)
- United Socialist Party of Venezuela (Great Patriotic Pole)
- Venezuelan Popular Unity (Great Patriotic Pole)

Vietnam

- Communist Party of Vietnam

=== W ===
Wales

- Welsh Labour
- Plaid Cymru
- Llais Gwynedd

Western Sahara

- Frente Polisario

=== Y ===
Yemen

- Arab Socialist Ba'ath Party – Yemen Region
- Democratic Nasserist Party
- Nasserist Reform Organisation
- Nasserist Unionist People's Organisation
- National Arab Socialist Ba'ath Party – Yemen Region
- Yemeni Socialist Party

=== Z ===
Zambia

- Citizens First
- Democratic Party (Zambia)
- Movement for Multi-Party Democracy
- Patriotic Front
- Resolute Party
- Zambia Must Prosper

Zimbabwe

- Citizens Coalition for Change
- Movement for Democratic Change – Ncube
- Movement for Democratic Change – Tsvangirai
- ZANU–PF
- Zimbabwe African People's Union
- Zimbabwe People's Democratic Party

== Ruling ==
Country	Logo	Name	Position	Ideology	Legislature	Notes
Albania		Socialist Party of Albania	Centre-left	Social democracy Pro-Europeanism	Parliament of Albania: 83 / 140	Alone holds the power of majority in Parliament
Albania		Social Democratic Party of Albania	Centre-left	Social democracy Pro-Europeanism	Parliament of Albania: 3 / 140	Supports the Socialist Party Government
Angola		People's Movement for the Liberation of Angola	Centre-left		National Assembly: 124 / 220	
Antigua and Barbuda		Antigua and Barbuda Labour Party	Centre-left		House of Representatives: 15 / 17	
Aruba		People's Electoral Movement			Parliament: 9 / 21	
Aruba		RAIZ			Parliament: 2 / 21	
Australia		Australian Labor Party			House of Representatives: 78 / 151	
Argentina		Communist Party of Argentina; Partido Comunista de la Argentina	Far-left	Marxism–Leninism; Internationalism	Chamber of Deputies: 0 / 257	Participates in the ruling Frente de Todos
Argentina		Communist Party of Argentina (Extraordinary Congress); Partido Comunista (Congreso Extraordinario)		Marxism–Leninism; Kirchnerism	Chamber of Deputies: 0 / 257	Participates in the ruling Frente de Todos
Argentina		Revolutionary Communist Party; Partido Comunista Revolucionario		Marxism–Leninism; Maoism; Anti-revisionism	Chamber of Deputies: 2 / 257	Participates in the ruling Frente de Todos
Argentina		Kolina		Kirchnerism		
Argentina		Victory Party		Social democracy Kirchnerism		
Argentina		New Encounter		Progressivism		
Argentina		Somos		Socialist feminism		
Argentina		Proyecto Sur		Progressivism		
Argentina		Broad Front		Kirchnerism; Social democracy Peronism		
Argentina		Solidary Party		Co-operatism; Socialism		
Argentina		Popular Unity		Socialism of the 21st century Left-wing nationalism		
Argentina		National Alfonsinist Movement		Social democracy K Radicalism		
Argentina		FORJA		Social democracy K Radicalism		
Argentina		Intransigent Party		Democratic socialism		
Argentina		Patria Grande Front		Socialism of the 21st century Feminism; Kirchnerism		
Argentina		Evita Movement		Kirchnerism		
Argentina		Protector Political Force		Social democracy		
Barbados		Barbados Labour Party			House of Assembly: 30 / 30	
Belarus		Communist Party of Belarus; Камуністычная партыя Беларусі		Marxism–Leninism; Belarusian–Russian unionism	House of Representatives: 11 / 110	Supports the government of president Alexander Lukashenko
Belgium		Socialist Party			Chamber of Representatives: 19 / 150	
Belgium		Groen			Chamber of Representatives: 8 / 150	
Belgium		Ecolo			Chamber of Representatives: 13 / 150	
Belgium		Vooruit			Chamber of Representatives: 9 / 150	
Belize		People's United Party			House of Representatives: 25 / 31	
Benin		Progressive Union			National Assembly: 44 / 83	
Bermuda		Progressive Labour Party			House of Assembly: 30 / 36	
Bhutan		Druk Nyamrup Tshogpa			National Assembly: 32 / 47	
Brazil		Communist Party of Brazil; Partido Comunista do Brasil	Left-wing to far-left	Communism; Marxism–Leninism	Chamber of Deputies: 7 / 513	Member of the ruling Brazil of Hope Federation
Brazil		Green Party; Partido Verde	Centre-left	Green politics Municipalism	Chamber of Deputies: 5 / 513	Member of the ruling Brazil of Hope Federation
Brazil		Workers' Party; Partido dos Trabalhadores	Centre-left to left-wing	Social democracy Progressivism; Lulism	Chamber of Deputies: 68 / 513	Member of the ruling Brazil of Hope Federation
Brazil		Brazilian Socialist Party; Partido Socialista Brasileiro	Centre-left	Social democracy Progressivism; Parliamentarianism	Chamber of Deputies: 14 / 513	Supports the government of president Lula da Silva
Brazil		Democratic Labour Party; Partido Democrático Trabalhista	Centre-left	Social democracy Labourism; Brazilian nationalism	Chamber of Deputies: 18 / 513	Supports the government of president Lula da Silva
Brazil		Socialism and Liberty Party; Partido Socialismo e Liberdade	Left-wing to far-left	Democratic socialism Eco-socialism; Socialism of the 21st century	Chamber of Deputies: 13 / 513	Member of the supporting PSOL REDE Federation
Brazil		Sustainability Network; Rede Sustentabilidade	Centre-left	Green politics Progressivism	Chamber of Deputies: 1 / 513	Member of the supporting PSOL REDE Federation
Bolivia		Movement for Socialism			Chamber of Deputies: 2 / 130	
Catalonia		Republican Left of Catalonia	Centre-left to Left-wing	Social democracy Catalan independence Republicanism	Parliament of Catalonia: 33 / 135	
Chile		Communist Party of Chile; Partido Comunista de Chile	Far-left	Marxism–Leninism	Chamber of Deputies: 12 / 155	Member of the ruling Apruebo Dignidad coalition
Chile		Social Convergence	Left-wing	Libertarian socialism, Autonomism	10	Member of the ruling Apruebo Dignidad coalition
Chile		Democratic Revolution	Centre-left to Left-wing	Social democracy, Democratic Socialism	7	Member of the ruling Apruebo Dignidad coalition
Chile		Commons	Left-wing	Socialism of the 21st century, Autonomism	6	Member of the ruling Apruebo Dignidad coalition
Chile		Social Green Regionalist Federation	Centre-left to Left-wing	Regionalism, Green politics	2	Member of the ruling Apruebo Dignidad coalition
Chile		Socialist Party of Chile	Centre-left	Social democracy	13	
Chile		Party for Democracy	Centre-left	Social democracy, Third Way	9	
Chile		Radical Party of Chile	Centre to Centre-left	Radicalism, Third Way	4	
Chile		Liberal Party	Centre-left	Social liberalism	4	
Colombia		Colombian Communist Party; Partido Comunista Colombiano		Marxism–Leninism; Bolivarianism	Chamber of Representatives: 0 / 172	Member of the ruling Historic Pact for Colombia
Colombia		Commons; Comunes		Marxism–Leninism; Bolivarianism	Chamber of Representatives: 5 / 172	Member of the ruling Historic Pact for Colombia
Nepal		Communist Party of Nepal (Maoist Centre) नेपाल कम्युनिष्ट पार्टी (माओवादी केन्द्र)		Prachanda Path; Left-wing nationalism	House of Representatives: 53 / 275	Member of the coalition government
Nepal		Communist Party of Nepal (Unified Socialist) नेपाल कम्युनिष्ट पार्टी (एकीकृत-समाजवादी)		Marxism–Leninism; People's Multiparty Democracy	House of Representatives: 25 / 275	Member of the coalition government
Nepal		National People's Front राष्ट्रिय जनमोर्चा		Marxism–Leninism; Anti-federalism	House of Representatives: 1 / 275	Supports the coalition government
Palestine		Popular Front for the Liberation of Palestine الجبهة الشعبية لتحرير فلسطين		Palestinian nationalism Marxism–Leninism; Revolutionary socialism One-state solution Anti-zionism	Legislative Council: 3 / 132	Member of the ruling PLO
Palestine		Democratic Front for the Liberation of Palestine الجبهة الشعبية لتحرير فلسطين		Marxism–Leninism; Palestinian nationalism Left-wing nationalism Anti-Zionism	Legislative Council: 1 / 132	Member of the ruling PLO
Palestine		Palestinian People's Party حزب الشعب الفلسطيني		Marxism; Scientific socialism Left-wing nationalism Palestinian nationalism	Legislative Council: 1 / 132	Member of the ruling PLO
Peru		Peruvian Communist Party; Partido Comunista Peruano		Marxism–Leninism; Mariáteguism	Congress: 0 / 130	Member of Together for Peru, which participates in the Free Peru-led government
Peru		Communist Party of Peru – Red Fatherland; Partido Comunista del Perú – Patria Roja		Marxism–Leninism; Mariáteguism; Socialist patriotism	Congress: 0 / 130	Member of Together for Peru, which participates in the Free Peru-led government
Peru		Free Peru; Perú Libre		Socialism; Marxism–Leninism; Mariáteguism	Congress: 32 / 130	In government
South Africa		African National Congress	Centre-left		National Assembly: 230 / 400	Participates in the ruling Tripartite Alliance
South Africa		South African Communist Party	Far-left	Marxism–Leninism; Left-wing nationalism	National Assembly: 0 / 400	Participates in the ruling Tripartite Alliance
Spain		Communist Party of Spain; Partido Comunista de España		Marxism–Leninism; Republicanism; Internationalism; Federalism	Congress of Deputies: 6 / 350	Participates in the United Left and Unidas Podemos, member of the PSOE-led government
Venezuela		Revolutionary Movement Tupamaro; Movimiento Revolucionario Tupamaro		Marxism-Leninism; Guevarism	Chamber of Deputies: 7 / 277	Participates in the ruling Great Patriotic Pole
Venezuela		United Socialist Party of Venezuela			Chamber of Deputies: 219 / 277	Participates in the ruling Great Patriotic Pole
Venezuela		Venezuelan Popular Unity; Unidad Popular Venezolana		Marxism-Leninism; Anti-imperialism; Bolivarianism	Chamber of Deputies: 2 / 277	Participates in the ruling Great Patriotic Pole
Venezuela		Venezuelan Revolutionary Currents; Corrientes Revolucionarias Venezolanas		Communism; Guevarism; Chavismo; Anti-imperialism	Chamber of Deputies: 0 / 277	Participates in the ruling Great Patriotic Pole
Wa State		United Wa State Party		Maoism		Rules the de facto independent Wa State

== Former ==
- Afghanistan – People's Democratic Party of Afghanistan, Settam-e-Melli, Shola-e Javid
- Albania – Democratic Front of Albania, National Liberation Movement, Party of Labour of Albania
- Algeria – Algerian Communist Party, Socialist Vanguard Party
- Angola – Angolan Communist Party, Communist Committee of Cabinda, Communist Organization of Angola
- Antigua and Barbuda – Antigua Caribbean Liberation Movement
- Argentina – Alliance for Work, Justice and Education, Argentine Socialist Vanguard Party, Democratic Socialist Party, Encuentro Amplio, Female Peronist Party, Front for a Country in Solidarity, Independent Socialist Party, Intransigent Radical Civic Union, Popular Socialist Party, Socialist Party of the National Left, Unitarian Party, United Left, Workers' Revolutionary Party
- Armenia – Armenian Workers Communist Party, Communist Party of Armenia, Marxist Party of Armenia, Renewed Communist Party of Armenia, Union of Communists of Armenia
- Australia – Australian Party, Australian Workers Party, Communist Party of Australia, Democratic Socialist Perspective, Industrial Labor Party, Industrial Socialist Labor Party, National Labor Party, Nuclear Disarmament Party, Protestant Labour Party, Restore the Workers' Rights Party, Social Democratic Party, Socialist Democracy, Socialist Labor Party, State Labor Party, Victorian Socialist Party
- Austria – Communist Initiative, Communist League of Austria, Czechoslovak Social Democratic Workers Party in the Republic of Austria, JETZT, League of Democratic Socialists, Marxist–Leninist Party of Austria, Union of Revolutionary Workers of Austria (Marxist–Leninist)
- Azerbaijan – Muslim Social Democratic Party
- Bahamas – Vanguard Nationalist and Socialist Party
- Bahrain – Popular Front for the Liberation of Bahrain
- Bangladesh – Bangladesh Krishak Sramik Awami League
- Barbados – Workers Party of Barbados
- Belarus – Belarusian Ecological Party, Belarusian Socialist Party, People's Accord Party
  - Byelorussian Soviet Socialist Republic – Belarusian Peasants' and Workers' Union, Communist Party of Byelorussia, Communist Party of Western Belorussia
  - Belarusian Democratic Republic – Belarusian Socialist Assembly, General Jewish Labour Bund
- Belgium – Belgian Socialist Party, Communist Party of Belgium
- Benin – People's Revolutionary Party of Benin
- Bhutan – Druk Chirwang Tshogpa
- Bolivia – Movement Without Fear, Revolutionary Left Party
- Bosnia and Herzegovina – League of Communists of Bosnia and Herzegovina, Social Democratic Union of Bosnia and Herzegovina
- Brazil – Brazilian Labour Party (1945), Free Fatherland Party
- Brunei – Brunei People's Party
- Bulgaria – Alternative Socialist Alliance – Independents, Bulgarian Communist Party, Bulgarian Fatherland Front, Bulgarian Social Democratic Workers' Party (Broad Socialists), Left Union for a Clean and Holy Republic
- Burkina Faso – African Independence Party, African Independence Party (Touré), Burkinabé Bolshevik Party, Burkinabé Communist Group, Burkinabé Socialist Bloc, Burkinabé Socialist Party, Change 2005, Convention of Progress Forces, Democratic Forces for Progress, Marxist–Leninist Group, Movement for Socialist Democracy, Organization for Popular Democracy – Labour Movement, Party for Democracy and Socialism, Party of Labour of Burkina, Patriotic League for Development, Popular Front, Rally of Social-Democrat Independents, Sankarist Pan-African Convention, Union of Burkinabé Communists, Union of Burkinabé Communists, Union of Communist Struggles – Reconstructed, Union of Communist Struggles – The Flame, Voltaic Communist Organization, Voltaic Labour Party
- Burundi – Burundi Workers' Party
- Cambodia – Cambodian National Unity Party, Communist Party of Kampuchea, Democratic Party, Khmer National Solidarity Party, Khmer Neutral Party, Khmer Rouge, Party of Democratic Kampuchea, Pracheachon, United Issarak Front
- Canada – Alberta Labor Representation League, Canadian Action Party, Cape Breton Labour Party, Communist Party of Canada (Marxist–Leninist) (Manitoba), Communist Party of Quebec, Co-operative Commonwealth Federation, Co-operative Commonwealth Federation (Manitoba), Co-operative Commonwealth Federation (Ontario Section), Democratic Alliance, Dominion Labor Party, Groupe socialiste des travailleurs du Québec, Helping Hand Party, Labor-Progressive Party, League for Socialist Action, Montréal Écologique, National Party of Canada, National Party of Canada (1979), Newfoundland People's Party, Option nationale, Parti de la Democratie Socialiste, Parti innovateur du Québec, Parti rouge, Parti social démocratique du Québec, Parti socialiste du Québec, Party for Accountability, Competency and Transparency, People's Front, Progressive Party of Canada, Reform movement, Regroupement des militants syndicaux, Revolutionary Workers League/Ligue Ouvrière Révolutionnaire, Revolutionary Workers League (in Manitoba), Socialist Labor Party, Socialist Party of British Columbia, Socialist Party of Canada, Socialist Party of North America, Strength in Democracy, Union des forces progressistes, United Party of Canada, Vision Montreal, Winnipeg into the '90s, Workers' Communist Party
- Chad - Chadian Progressive Party
- Chile – Citizen Left, Concertación, Democratic Alliance of Chile, Democratic Party, MAS Region, New Democratic Left, Nueva Mayoría, Popular Front, Popular Unitary Action Movement, Popular Unity, Socialist Democratic Party
- China - China Democratic Socialist Party (mainland), Productive People's Party, Zhi Xian Party
- Colombia - Clandestine Colombian Communist Party, Hope, Peace, and Liberty
- Congo, Democratic Republic of the – Mouvement National Congolais, Parti Solidaire Africain
- Congo, Republic of the – National Movement of the Revolution
- Costa Rica - Democratic Force, National Rescue Party
- Croatia – Dalmatian Action, League of Communists of Croatia, Social Democratic Party of Croatia and Slavonia
- Cuba – Partido Auténtico, Partido Ortodoxo, People's Party, Popular Socialist Party, Socialist Party of Manzanillo
- Cyprus - Committee for a Radical Left Rally, Fighting Democratic Movement
- Czech Republic – Friends of Beer Party, Liberal-Social Union, Party for Life Security, Party of the Democratic Left
- Czechoslovakia - Carpatho-Russian Labour Party of Small Peasants and Landless, Communist Party of Czechoslovakia, Communist Party of Czechoslovakia (German Division), Communist Party of Czechoslovakia (Leninists), Communist Party of Slovakia, Communist Party of Slovakia – 91, German Social Democratic Workers' Party in the Czechoslovak Republic, Hungarian-German Social Democratic Party, Labour Party, Marxist Left in Slovakia and the Transcarpathian Ukraine, National Front, National Labour Party, Polish People's Party, Social Democratic Workers' Party in Subcarpathian Rus', Socialist League of the New East, Socialist Party of the Czechoslovak Working People, The Party of Moderate Progress Within the Bounds of the Law, Union of Communists of Slovakia
- Denmark – Common Course, Communist League, Communist Party in Denmark, Fokus, Folkeringen, Left Socialists, Socialist Workers Party, United Democrats
- Dominican Republic – Blue Party, Dominican Communist Party
- Egypt – Arab Socialist Union, Democratic Movement for National Liberation, Liberal Constitutional Party
- El Salvador - National Opposition Union
- Equatorial Guinea - Popular Idea of Equatorial Guinea
- Eritrea - Eritrean Democratic Working People's Party, Eritrean People's Liberation Front
- Estonia – Communist Party of Estonia, Communist Party of Estonia (1990), Constitution Party, Estonian Labour Party, Estonian Left Party, Estonian Social Democratic Workers' Party, Intermovement
- Eswatini - Swaziland Communist Party
- Ethiopia – All-Ethiopia Socialist Movement, Commission for Organizing the Party of the Working People of Ethiopia, Ethiopian People's Revolutionary Democratic Front, Ethiopian Somali People's Democratic Party, Marxist–Leninist League of Tigray, Oromo Democratic Party, Workers' Party of Ethiopia
- Faroe Islands - Faroese Communist Party, Faroese Socialists, Oyggjaframi (M-L)
- Finland – Ålandic Left, Communist Party of Finland, Democratic Alternative, Finnish People's Democratic League, For the Poor, Left Group of Finnish Workers, Radical People's Party, Reform Group, Social Democratic Union of Workers and Smallholders, Socialist Unity Party, Socialist Workers Party, Socialist Workers Party of Finland, Workers' Party of Finland
- France – Alternative libertaire, Cordeliers, Enragés, French Section of the Workers' International, Hébertists, Jacobin, Proletarian Unity Party, Revolutionary Communist League, Socialist Party of France, The Mountain, Unified Socialist Party, Workers' Party
- Gambia, The - Gambia Socialist Revolutionary Party
- Georgia – Communist Party of Georgia, Democratic Union for Revival, Georgian Socialist-Federalist Revolutionary Party, Social Democratic Party of Georgia, Union of Citizens of Georgia
- Germany – Labour and Social Justice – The Electoral Alternative, Party of Democratic Socialism, Socialist Unity Party of West Berlin, United Left
  - Divided Germany - Communist Party of Germany, Communist Party of Germany/Marxists–Leninists, East German Green Party, German Democratic Union, Social Democratic Party in the GDR, Socialist Unity Party of Germany
  - Nazi Germany - Communist Party of Germany (Opposition), Socialist Workers' Party of Germany
  - Weimar Republic - Communist Workers' Party of Germany, Independent Social Democratic Party of Germany, Old Social Democratic Party of Germany, Spartacus League
  - German Empire - Free-minded People's Party, General German Workers' Association, German Free-minded Party, German People's Party, German Progress Party, National-Social Association, Progressive People's Party, Social Democratic Workers' Party of Germany
- Ghana – People's Convention Party, People's National Party
- Gibraltar - Association for the Advancement of Civil Rights, Gibraltar Labour Party, Reform Party
- Greece – Communist Party of Greece (Interior), Democratic Socialist Party of Greece, Greek Left, Left Liberals, Movement for a United Communist Party of Greece, National Political Union, Organisation of Marxist–Leninist Communists of Greece, Party of Democratic Socialism, Party of Radicals, Progress and Left Forces Alliance, Radical Left Front, Radical Movement of Social Democratic Alliance, Reformers for Democracy and Development, Socialist Party of Greece, United Democratic Left, United Left, United Socialist Alignment of Greece
- Greenland - Labour Party
- Grenada – New Jewel Movement, Maurice Bishop Patriotic Movement
- Guatemala – Guatemalan Party of Labour, Guatemalan Christian Democracy, Movimiento Nueva República, Party of the Guatemalan Revolution, Revolutionary Action Party, Socialist Party
- Guinea – Socialist Democracy of Guinea
- Haiti – Haitian Communist Party, Popular Socialist Party, Unified Party of Haitian Communists
- Honduras - Party for the Transformation of Honduras
- Hong Kong - Citizens Party, Community March, Democratic Progressive Party of Hong Kong, Democratic Self-Government Party of Hong Kong, Demosisto, Hong Kong Affairs Society, Hong Kong Confederation of Trade Unions, Hong Kong Observers, Hong Kong Socialist Democratic Party, Meeting Point, Social Democratic Forum, Team Chu Hoi-dick of New Territories West, The Frontier, United Democrats of Hong Kong
- Hungary – 4K! – Fourth Republic!, Address Party, Democratic Coalition Party, Democratic Party, Humanist Party, Hungarian Communist Party, Hungarian Radical Party, Hungarian Socialist Workers' Party, Hungarian Working People's Party, Left Centre, Opposition Party, Party of Independence and '48, Resolution Party, United Opposition
- Iceland – Communist Party of Iceland, Communist Party of Iceland (Marxist–Leninist), National Awakening, National Preservation Party, People's Alliance, People's Unity Party – Socialist Party, Rainbow, Social Democratic Party, Women's List
- India – Congress Socialist Party, Ghadar Movement, Praja Socialist Party, Samta Party, Samyukta Socialist Party
- Indonesia – Acoma Party, Communist Party of Indonesia, Indonesian Islamic Union Party, Indonesian National Party, Labour Party, Murba Party, Partai Tionghoa Indonesia, Permai, Socialist Party of Indonesia
- Iran – Communist Party of Persia, Organization of Iranian People's Fedai Guerrillas, Organization of Struggle for the Emancipation of the Working Class
- Iraq – Ila al-Amam, Iraqi Communist Party, Iraqi Communist Party (Central Command) (Widhat al-Qa'idah), Iraqi Communist Vanguard Organisation, League of Iraqi Communists, Leninist Group in the Iraqi Communist Movement, National Democratic Party, Organization of Iraqi Revolutionary Communists, People's Union, Rayat ash-Shaghilah
- Ireland – Clann na Poblachta, Democratic Left, Democratic Socialist Party, Independent Socialist Party, Saor Éire, Socialist Labour Party, Workers Power
- Israel – Ahdut HaAvoda, Alignment, Democratic Union, Faction independent of Ahdut HaAvoda, Fighters' List, Hebrew Communists, Independent Socialist Faction, Left Camp of Israel, Left Faction, Maki, Mapai, Mapam, Matzpen, Meri, Moked, One Israel, One Nation, Progressive List for Peace, Rafi, Ratz, Unity Party, Ya'ad – Civil Rights Movement
- Italy – CARC Party, Communist Party of Italy (Marxist–Leninist), Communist Refoundation Party, Communist Party of the Free Territory of Trieste, Democratic Party of the Left, Democrats of the Left, Democratic Left, Democrats of the Left, Federation of the Greens, Italian Communist Party, Italian Democratic Socialists, Italian Socialist Party, Italian (Marxist–Leninist) Communist Party, Italian Socialist Party of Proletarian Unity, Marxist–Leninist Italian Communist Party, Movement of Unitarian Communists, Proletarian Democracy, Party of Italian Communists, People's Union (Italy), Proletarian Unity Party, Venetian Left (2015), Workers' Communist Party (Italy)
- Jamaica – Workers Party of Jamaica
- Japan – Democratic Socialist Party, Farmer-Labour Party, Japan Labour-Farmer Party, Japan Socialist Party, Leftist Socialist Party of Japan, Rightist Socialist Party of Japan
- Jersey – Jersey Communist Party
- Kenya – Kenya People's Union
- Kosovo – League of Communists of Kosovo, Partia e Fortë
- Kyrgyzstan – Communist Party of Kirghizia
- Laos – Pathet Lao
- Latvia – Communist Party of Latvia, General Jewish Labour Bund in Latvia, Latvian Social Democratic Party, Revolutionary Socialist Party of Latvia
- Lebanon – Lebanese National Movement
- Liberia – Progressive Alliance of Liberia
- Lithuania – Communist Party of Lithuania, Democratic Labour Party of Lithuania, Front Party, Socialist Party of Lithuania
- Luxembourg – Social Democratic Party
- Macedonia – League of Communists of Macedonia
- Malaysia – Communist Party of Malaya, Labour Party of Malaya, National Convention Party
- Maldives - Gaumee Itthihaad
- Malta - Democratic Alternative
- Mali – Sudanese Union – African Democratic Rally (original)
- Mexico – Mexican Communist Party, Mexican Liberal Party, Mexican People's Party, Mexican Socialist Party, Mexican Workers' Party, Party of the Cardenist Front of National Reconstruction, Social Democracy, Social Democratic Party, Socialist Convergence, Unified Socialist Party of Mexico, Workers' Revolutionary Party
- Moldova – Communist Party of Moldova
- Mongolia - Mongolian People's Revolutionary Party
- Montenegro – League of Communists of Montenegro
- Morocco – Democratic Socialist Party, Ila al-Amam, Labour Party, Moroccan Communist Party, National Union of Popular Forces, Socialist Party
- Myanmar – Anti-Fascist People's Freedom League, Burma Socialist Party, Burma Socialist Programme Party, Burma Workers Party, Communist Party of Burma (original)
- Nepal – Communist Party of Nepal
- Netherlands – Communist Party of the Netherlands, Democratic Socialists '70, Independent Socialist Party, Pacifist Socialist Party, Political Party of Radicals, Revolutionary Socialist Party, Social Democratic League, Social Democratic Workers' Party, Socialist Party
- New Zealand – Communist Party of New Zealand, Democratic Labour Party, Independent Political Labour League, Jim Anderton's Progressive Party, NewLabour Party, New Zealand Socialist Party, Residents Action Movement, United Labour Party
- Niger – Sawaba
- Nigeria – Socialist Workers and Farmers Party of Nigeria
- North Korea – Workers' Party of North Korea
- Norway – Radical Socialists, Red Electoral Alliance, Social Democratic Labour Party of Norway, Workers' Communist Party
- Oman – Dhofar Liberation Front, Popular Front for the Liberation of Oman, Popular Front for the Liberation of the Occupied Arabian Gulf
- Pakistan – Azad Pakistan Party, Labour Party Pakistan, National Awami Party, Pakistan Communist Party, Pakistan Socialist Party
- Palestinian territories – National Liberation League in Palestine, Palestine Communist Party
- Poland – Social Democracy of the Kingdom of Poland and Lithuania, Communist Party of Poland, Polish Workers' Party, Polish United Workers' Party, Communist Party of the Free City of Danzig, Social Democratic Party of the Free City of Danzig, Union of Polish Patriots
- Portugal – Leftwing Union for the Socialist Democracy, Portuguese Socialist Party
- Puerto Rico – Puerto Rican Socialist Party, Puerto Rican Communist Party
- Romania – General Jewish Labour Bund in Romania, Ploughmen's Front, Romanian Communist Party, Romanian Social Democratic Party, Romanian Social Party, Social Democratic Party of Romania, Socialist Party of Romania
- Russia – Agrarian Party of Russia, Civic Union, Civil United Green Alternative, Committee for Workers' Democracy and International Socialism, Communist Party of the Republic of Tatarstan, Communist Party of the Russian Soviet Federative Socialist Republic, Confederation of Anarcho-Syndicalists, Green Alliance, Ivan Rybkin Bloc, Party of Social Justice, Party of Workers' Self-Government, Patriots of Russia, Russian Communist Workers Party, Russian United Social Democratic Party, Social Democratic Party of Russia (1990), Social Democratic Party of Russia (2001), Social Democratic Party of Russia (2012), Socialist League Vpered, Socialist Resistance, Socialist United Party of Russia, Spiritual Heritage, Stalin Bloc – For the USSR, Trade Unions and Industrialists – Union of Labour, Tuvan People's Revolutionary Party, Union of Greens of Russia, Union of Social Democrats
  - Soviet Union – Anti-Party Group, Communist Party of the Soviet Union, Group of Democratic Centralism, Left Opposition, Left School, Left Socialist-Revolutionaries, Left-Right Bloc, Neo-Communist Party of the Soviet Union, Party of New Communists, Right Opposition, State Committee on the State of Emergency, True Communists, Union of Marxist-Leninists, United Opposition, Workers Group of the Russian Communist Party, Workers' Opposition, Workers' Truth
  - Russian Empire – Black Repartition, Circle of Tchaikovsky, Emancipation of Labour, General Jewish Labour Bund, Jewish Communist Party (Poalei Zion), Jewish Social Democratic Labour Party (Poalei Zion), Jewish Socialist Workers Party, Land and Liberty, League of Struggle for the Emancipation of the Working Class, Left Socialist-Revolutionaries, Narodnaya Volya, Party of Narodnik Communists, Party of Revolutionary Communism, People's Rights Party, Petrashevsky Circle, Popular Socialists, Russian Social Democratic Labour Party, Russian Social Democratic Labour Party (Bolsheviks), Russian Social Democratic Labour Party (Internationalists), Russian Social Democratic Labour Party (Mensheviks), Russian Social Democratic Labour Party (of Internationalists), Socialist Revolutionary Party, Trudoviks, Union of Socialists-Revolutionaries Maximalists, Union of Working Peasants Workers' Party for the Political Liberation of Russia, Zionist Socialist Workers Party
- Saint Lucia – National Alliance
- Saint Vincent and the Grenadines – Saint Vincent Labour Party
- San Marino – Sammarinese Communist Party, Sammarinese Socialist Party, Sammarinese Communist Refoundation
- Saudi Arabia – Arab Socialist Action Party – Arabian Peninsula, Communist Party in Saudi Arabia
- Serbia – League of Communists of Serbia, League of Communists of Vojvodina
- Singapore – Barisan Sosialis, Labour Front
- Slovakia – Communist Party of Slovakia
- Slovenia – League of Communists of Slovenia
- Solomon Islands – Solomon Islands Labour Party
- Somalia – Somali Revolutionary Socialist Party
- South Africa – Labour Party
- South Korea – Communist Party of Korea, Workers Party of South Korea, Laboring People's Party, Progressive Party, United Socialist Party of Korea, Democratic Party (South Korea, 2013), Democratic Party (South Korea, 2000), Democratic Labor Party, Democratic Party (South Korea, 2007), Democratic Party (South Korea, 2014) Unified Progressive Party, Socialist Party, New Progressive Party, People's United Party
  See the article: Progressivism in South Korea
- Spain – Batasuna, Communist Party of the Basque Homelands, Workers' Party of Marxist Unification
- Sudan – Sudanese Socialist Union
- Suriname – Communist Party of Suriname
- Switzerland – Communist Party of Switzerland, Progressive Organizations of Switzerland
- Syria – National Progressive Front: Arab Socialist Ba'ath Party – Syria Region, Arab Socialist Movement, Arab Socialist Union, Arabic Democratic Unionist Party, Democratic Socialist Unionist Party, National Vow Movement, Socialist Unionists, Syrian Communist Party (Bakdash), Syrian Communist Party (Unified), Popular Front for Change and Liberation, People's Will Party
- Taiwan – China Democratic Socialist Party (1945–2020), Taiwanese Communist Party
- Tanzania – Afro-Shirazi Party, Tanganyika African National Union, Umma Party
- Thailand – Communist Party of Thailand, Socialist Party of Thailand
- Togo – Juvento, Pan-African Socialist Party
- Trinidad and Tobago – Butler Party, Democratic Labour Party, United Labour Front, Workers and Farmers Party, Trinidad Labour Party, Communist Party of Trinidad and Tobago, Caribbean Socialist Party, Caribbean National Labour Party, Tobago Organization of the People
- Tunisia – Tunisian Communist Party
- Turkey – Communist Party of Turkey, Democratic People's Party, Democratic Society Party, Equality and Democracy Party, Social Democracy Party (SODEP), Social Democratic Populist Party, Workers Party of Turkey
- Turkmenistan – Communist Party of Turkmenistan
- Ukraine – Borotbisty, Communist Party of Ukraine
- United Kingdom – Chartist Party, Common Wealth Party, Communist Party of Great Britain, Independent Labour Party, National Labour Organisation, Republican Labour Party, Social Democratic Federation
- United States – American Labor Party, Farmer-Labor Party, New Alliance Party, Nonpartisan League, Proletarian Party of America, Social Democratic Party, Socialist Party of America, Workers Party, Workingmen's Party of the United States
- Uzbekistan – Communist Party of Uzbekistan
- Venezuela – Fifth Republic Movement, People's Electoral Movement, Revolutionary Left Movement
- Vietnam – Indochinese Communist Party, National Liberation Front
- Yemen – National Liberation Front
- Yugoslavia – League of Communists of Yugoslavia
- Zimbabwe – United Progressive Party

== See also ==
- List of right-wing political parties
- List of centrist political parties
- List of syncretic political parties
- List of left-conservative political parties (disambiguation)

=== Politics ===
- Left-wing politics
- Centre-left
- Far left
- Ultra left
- Radical left (disambiguation)
- Labour movement
- Marxism
- Social democracy
- Socialism
- Left-conservatism
- Left-wing nationalism

=== Parties ===
- International Communist Party
- Communist Party
- Communist party (disambiguation)
- Democratic Socialist Party
- Global Greens
- List of Labour Parties
- Progressive Alliance
- Social Democratic Party
- Socialist Equality Party
- Socialist International
- Socialist Labour Party
- Socialist Party
- Socialist Workers Party
- Labor Party (disambiguation)
- Workers' Party
- Lists of political parties
