= List of political parties in Eritrea =

Eritrea is a one-party state, with the People's Front for Democracy and Justice being the only party that is legally allowed to exist in the country. Elections occur to elect representatives for the country's regional assemblies and other posts within the country's districts, but there are no national elections in Eritrea.

== Other parties ==
Only the People's Front for Democracy and Justice is legally allowed to operate in Eritrea, though other parties exist outside Eritrea or illegally operate inside Eritrea.

=== Current parties ===
Party/Group	Abbr.	Leader	Ideology	National Assembly	Political position	Status
People's Front for Democracy and Justice ህዝባዊ ግንባር ንደሞክራስን ፍትሕን; Hizibawī Ginibari Nidemokirasini Fitiḥini الجبهة الشعبية للديمقراطية والعدالة	PFDJ ህግንፍ	Isaias Afewerki	Eritrean nationalism Secularism; Left-wing nationalism Socialism	75 / 150	Left-wing to far-left	Sole legal party
Eritrean Islamic Jihad حركة الجهاد الإسلامي الإريتري; Harakat al-Jihad al-Islami al-Eritrea	EIJ	Shaikh Khalil Mohammed Amer	Islamism; Islamic fundamentalism Salafi jihadism	0 / 150	Far-right	Illegal terrorist organisation
Eritrean People's Democratic Front ደሞክራሲያዊ ግንባር ሓድነት ኤርትራ; Demokirasīyawī Ginibari Ḥadineti Ēritira الجبهة الديموقراطية الشعبية الإرترية	EPDF	Tewelde Ghebreselassie	Social democracy	0 / 150	Centre-left	Illegal opposition group
Eritrean National Salvation Front جبهة الإنقاذ الوطني الإريترية	ENSF	Tuamzghi Teame	Social democracy Secularism	0 / 150	Centre-left	Illegal opposition group
Eritrean Liberation Front ተጋደሎ ሓርነት ኤርትራ; Tegadelo Ḥarineti Ēritira جبهة التحرير الإريترية	ELF	Hussein Kelifah	Eritrean nationalism Social conservatism	0 / 150	Centre-right	Illegal opposition group. Was the main independence movement pre-EPLF

=== Former parties ===
Former parties
Name	Native name	Ideology	Notes
Eritrean Democratic Working People's Party	hizb alshaeb aleamil aldiymuqratiu al'iirytriu	Marxism	Constituted the core of the ELF
Eritrean People's Revolutionary Party	alhizb althawriu alshaebiu al'iirytriu	Marxism	Related to the EPLF
Eritrean People's Liberation Front	aljabhat alshaebiat litahrir 'iiritria	Eritrean nationalism Left-wing nationalism Secularism; Socialism; Self-determination; Marxism-Leninism	Predecessor to the current ruling party
Independent Moslem League	alrrabitat al'iislamiat almustaqila	Eritrean-Ethiopian unionism Muslim interests	Muslim minority party
Eritrea for Eritreans Party	Ertra n'ertrawian	Liberalism; Secularism	Anti-unionist pre-independence party
Moslem League of the Western Province	alrrabitat al'iislamiat lilmintaqat algharbia	Eritrean-Ethiopian unionism Muslim interests	Muslim minority party
New Eritrea Party	Mahber Hadas Ertra	Eritrean nationalism Pro-Italian trusteeship	Italian-aligned pro-independence party

== See also ==
- Politics of Eritrea
- List of political parties by country
