= Confédération générale du travail du Burkina =

CGT-B
- General Confederation of Labour of Burkina
- Confédération générale du travail du Burkina
- Founded: October 29, 1988
- Headquarters: Ouagadougou, Burkina Faso
- Location: Burkina Faso
- Members: 12 national unions, 70 company unions
- Key people: Bassolma Bazié, general secretary
- Website: www.cgtb.bf

Confédération générale du travail du Burkina ('General Confederation of Labour of Burkina', abbreviated CGT-B) is a revolutionary national trade union centre in Burkina Faso. Bassolma Bazié the general secretary of CGT-B.

== History ==
CGT-B was founded by eight trade unions at its first congress held October 28–29, 1988 by eight trade unions. CGT-B emerged from the Trade Union Front (Front Syndical) formed by autonomous trade unions on January 28, 1985. The Trade Union Front had been formed in order to coordinate labour resistance to the repression of the Thomas Sankara government.

At the time of its foundation CGTB began to challenge the hegemony of the Confédération Syndicale Burkinabé of Soumané Touré in the Burkinabè labour movement, and the new trade union centre became a dominant player in trade union activism in the country. When the Structural Adjustment Programmes were introduced in Burkina Faso, CGT-B opposed them.

CGT-B consists of 12 national trade union and 70 company trade unions. The organization has 28 provincial unions. The oldest of its affiliated unions is the bakers' union, Fédération nationale des boulangers et pâtissiers du Burkina (FNBPB), founded in 1960. Another affiliate, SYNTSHA (a trade union of health workers) led various several strikes in the public health sector in the 1990s.

After the murder of Norbert Zongo in 1998, CGTB took part in the founding of the Collective of Democratic Mass Organizations and Political Parties. Tolé Sagnon of CGT-B became one of the vice presidents of the Collective.

At several times, CGTB and its leaders has been subject to harassment and threats.

In 2008, CGT-B took part in the protests against high cost of living.

== Affiliated unions ==
- Fédération Nationale des Boulangers et Pâtissiers du Burkina
- Syndicat National des Travailleurs de la Santé Humaine et Animale
- Syndicat National des Agents des Impôts et des Domaines
- Syndicat National des Travailleurs de l'Education et de la Recherche
- Syndicat des Travailleurs de la Géologie, des Mines et Hydrocarbures
- Syndicat national des Travailleurs des Brasseries
- Syndicat des Travailleurs des Travaux publics, du Bâtiment, de l'Hydraulique et Assimilés
- Syndicat National des Travailleurs de l'Environnement, du Tourisme et de l'Hôtelerie
- Syndicat National des travailleurs du Textile
- Syndicat National des Travailleurs de l'Agriculture
- Syndicat National des Agents du Conseil Burkinabè des Chargeurs
- Syndicat National des Travailleurs de la Planification et de la Coopération
