= KKO (disambiguation) =

KKO may refer to:

- Korps Komando, a former name of the Indonesian Marine Corps
- kko, the ISO 639-3 code for Karko language (Sudan)
- Kinima koinonikis oikologias, an ecosocialist political party in Cyprus
- korkein oikeus, the court of last resort for cases within the private law of Finland
- Kuopio livestock sales cooperative, a Finnish food industry company
- Kaikohe Aerodrome, the IATA code KKO
- Koblenz Hauptbahnhof, the DS100 code KKO
