= Liberal Progressive Party =

There are several political parties called Liberal Progressive Party:

- Liberal Progressive Party (Costa Rica, 1889)
- Liberal Progressive Party (Costa Rica, 2016)
- Liberal Progressive Party (Eritrea)
- Liberal Progressive Party (Spain)
