= Coordination Council =

Coordination Council may refer to:

- Coordination Council of Leftist Forces, a political alliance in Azerbaijan
- Coordination Council (Belarus), an opposition council of Belarusians aiming to transfer power from Aleksander Lukashenko
- Islamic Development Coordination Council, Iran, founded in 1980
- Council for Coordinating the Reforms Front, Iran, also known as the Reformist Front Coordination Council, founded in 1999
- Coordination Council of Islamic Revolution Forces, Iran, founded in 2000
- Russian Opposition Coordination Council
