= Ali Radai =

Eritrean politician

Sheikh Ali Radai was a politician in Eritrea, playing an instrumental role in the early Eritrean political scene. Sheikh Ali Radai was the first president of the Eritrean parliament.

== Early life and education ==
Sheikh Ali Radai was born in 1913 in Keren, Eritrea. The father of Radai, Mohammed Musa was a wealthy businessman. Radai was enrolled into the Qur'anic school of Keren and he was also a student at the School of arts and crafts ("Salvago Raggi"). He worked as a carpenter as well as a goldsmith and eventually opened a retailer shop of his own which he built in 1934 to a major supplier of hardware and textile products.

== Political career ==
Sheikh Ali Radai was one of the founding members of the Muslim League of Eritrea. In the late 1940s Radai was elected as the official secretary of the Keren branch of the Muslim League. He was a very influential figure in the organization. In the year 1952 Sheikh Ali Radai was elected to the Eritrean parliament. After the preparation of the parliament and federal laws, Sheikh Ali Radai was elected to become the first president of the Eritrean parliament in 1952. He served as the official president of the parliament from the year 1952 to 1955. After 1956 he worked as a councillor to the Eritrean administration with a ministerial rank.
