= Progressive Alliance =

Social democratic and progressive political international

- Logo
- Abbreviation: PA
- Formation: 22 May 2013; 13 years ago
- Type: Political international
- Purpose: Network of social democratic, democratic socialist and progressive political parties and organisations
- Headquarters: Berlin, Germany
- Global Coordinator: Machris Cabreros
- Main organ: Conference of the Progressive Alliance
- Website: progressive-alliance.info

The Progressive Alliance (PA) is a political international of progressive and social democratic political parties and organisations founded on 22 May 2013 in Leipzig, Germany. The alliance was formed as an alternative to the existing Socialist International, of which many of its member parties are former or current members. The Progressive Alliance claims to have 140 participants from around the world.

== History ==
The first step towards the creation of the Progressive Alliance was the decision in January 2012 by Sigmar Gabriel, then chairman of the Social Democratic Party of Germany (SPD), to cancel payment of the SPD's £100,000 yearly membership fee to the Socialist International. Gabriel had been critical of the Socialist International's admittance and continuing inclusion of undemocratic political movements into the organisation.

An initial Conference of the Progressive Alliance was held in Rome, Italy, on 14–15 December 2012, with representatives of 42 political parties attending. They included Pier Luigi Bersani, leader of the Democratic Party of Italy; Harlem Désir, Chair of the French Socialist Party; Hermes Binner, Chair of the Argentine Socialist Party; Peter Shumlin, Democratic governor of Vermont; and Mustapha Ben Jafar, Secretary General of the Tunisian Democratic Forum for Labour and Liberties. Also present were representatives of the Indian National Congress, the Workers' Party of Brazil, and PASOK of Greece. The Dutch Labour Party also supported the formation of the organisation, as did the Swiss Socialist Party, and the Social Democratic Party of Austria.

During the Council of the Socialist International in Cascais, Portugal, on 4–5 February 2013, 50 political parties discussed on the sidelines the formation of the Progressive Alliance, including the Movement for Democratic Change of Zimbabwe.

The official foundation of the organisation was held on 22 May 2013 in Leipzig, Germany, on the 150th anniversary of the formation of the General German Workers' Association (ADAV), the predecessor of the SPD. The organisation stated the aim of becoming the global network of "the progressive, democratic, social-democratic, socialist and labour movement". It was reported that representatives of approximately 70 social-democratic political parties from across the world attended the event. The Progressive Alliance of Socialists and Democrats (S&D) group in the European Parliament joined the organisation upon its official foundation. Many member parties are also affiliated to the Socialist International. In September 2013 the Democratic Party of Cyprus (DIKO) announced that it was negotiating to join the Progressive Alliance and that its representatives were to attend a seminar of the international in Stockholm on 24 October. The Democratic Party of Korea (DPK) was a founding member but withdrew in 2016. The DPK rejoined the organisation in c. 2025–2026.

On 4–5 December 2014, a Progressive Alliance conference was held in Lisbon for member parties of the S&D group. A regional seminar was held on 25 September 2015 in Batu Ferringhi, Malaysia, which also hosted delegates from the Democratic Action Party of Malaysia, Democratic Party of Japan and Indonesian Democratic Party of Struggle. On 25 April 2016 the organisation held a seminar in São Paulo hosted by the Workers' Party of Brazil.

== Participants ==
The Progressive Alliance lists 119 parties and 28 organisations which participate in the network, rather than claiming members.

Country	Party/Organization	Abbreviation	Nationwise Lower/Unicameral House	Government status	Notes
Algeria	Socialist Forces Front	FFS	12 / 407	In opposition	
Argentina	Socialist Party	PS	2 / 257	neither government nor opposition	
Argentina	Generation for a National Encounter	GEN	1 / 257	neither government nor opposition	
Australia	Australian Labor Party	ALP	94 / 150	In government	Ruling at a national level with a parliamentary majority since 2022. Ruling at state-level in New South Wales, South Australia, Victoria, Western Australia, and the Australian Capital Territory.
Austria	Social Democratic Party of Austria	SPÖ	41 / 183	In government	In coalition governments at federal level and at state-level in Burgenland, Carinthia, Vienna.
Bahrain	National Democratic Action Society	Waad	0 / 40	Extra-parliamentary opposition	Banned in its country as a terrorist organisation as of 2017.
Belarus	Belarusian Social Democratic Party	Hramada	0 / 110	Extra-parliamentary opposition	
Belgium	Socialist Party	PS	16 / 150	In opposition	
Belgium	Forward	Vooruit	13 / 150	In coalition	
Benin	The Democrats	LD	28 / 109	In opposition	
Bolivia	Movement for Socialism	MAS	2 / 130	In opposition	
Bosnia and Herzegovina	Social Democratic Party of Bosnia and Herzegovina	SDP	5 / 42	In government	
Brazil	Workers' Party	PT	70 / 513	In government	In government in Bahia, Ceará, Piauí and Rio Grande do Norte.
Brazil	Brazilian Socialist Party	PSB	15 / 513	In coalition	In government in Espírito Santo, Maranhão and Paraíba.
Bulgaria	Bulgarian Socialist Party	BSP	0 / 240	Extra-parliamentary opposition	
Burkina Faso	People's Movement for Progress	MPP	Dissolved	Extra-parliamentary opposition	President Roch Marc Christian Kaboré, a member of the party, was deposed in a midterm coup d'état.
Cameroon	Social Democratic Front	SDF	5 / 180	In opposition	
Canada	New Democratic Party	NDP/NPD	6 / 343	In opposition	In government in the province of Manitoba.
Central African Republic	Movement for the Liberation of the Central African People	MLPC	0 / 100	Extra-parliamentary opposition	
Chile	Socialist Party of Chile	PS	11 / 155	In opposition	
Chile	Party for Democracy	PPD	9 / 155	In opposition	
Costa Rica	Citizens' Action Party	PAC	1 / 57	In opposition	
Croatia	Social Democratic Party of Croatia	SDP	37 / 151	In opposition	
Cyprus	EDEK Socialist Party	EDEK	0 / 56	Extra-parliamentary opposition	
Cyprus	Democratic Party	DIKO	8 / 56	In government	
Czech Republic	Social Democracy	SOCDEM	0 / 200	Extra-parliamentary opposition	
Democratic Republic of Congo	Union for Democracy and Social Progress	UDPS	69 / 484	In government	
Denmark	Social Democratic Party		38 / 179	In coalition	
Dominican Republic	Modern Revolutionary Party	PRM	134 / 190	In government	
Egypt	Egyptian Social Democratic Party	ESDP	7 / 596	In opposition	
Equatorial Guinea	Convergence for Social Democracy	CPDS	1 / 100	In opposition	
Eritrea	Eritrean People's Democratic Front	EPDF	0 / 150	Extra-parliamentary opposition	Banned as a legal party due to country being a one-party state.
Estonia	Social Democratic Party	SDE	9 / 101	In opposition	
Eswatini	People's United Democratic Movement	PUDEMO	0 / 66	Extra-parliamentary opposition	All political parties are banned.
Eswatini	Swazi Democratic Party	SWADEPA	0 / 66	Extra-parliamentary opposition	All political parties are banned.
Finland	Social Democratic Party of Finland	SDP	43 / 200	In opposition	
France	Socialist Party	PS	67 / 577	In opposition	
Germany	Social Democratic Party of Germany	SPD	120 / 630	In government	
Ghana	National Democratic Congress	NDC	184 / 275	In government	
Greece	Panhellenic Socialist Movement	PASOK	31 / 300	In opposition	
Grenada	National Democratic Congress	NDC	14 / 15	In government	On French list of members, but not English list.
Guinea	Guinean People's Assembly	RPG	1 / 81	In opposition	President Alpha Condé, a member of the party, was deposed in a midterm coup d'état. Moreover, the National Assembly, where it held a supermajority, was replaced by the junta-appointed National Transitional Council.
Hungary	Hungarian Socialist Party	MSZP	0 / 199	Extra-parliamentary opposition	
India	Indian National Congress	INC	100 / 543	In opposition	Affiliated with INDIA in national parliament.
India	Samajwadi Party	SP	37 / 543	In opposition	
Indonesia	Indonesian Democratic Party of Struggle	PDI-P	110 / 580	Confidence and supply	
Indonesia	NasDem Party	NasDem	69 / 580	Confidence and supply	
Iran	Democratic Party of Iranian Kurdistan	PDKI	0 / 290	Extra-parliamentary opposition	
Iran	Komala Party of Iranian Kurdistan	KPIK	0 / 290	Extra-parliamentary opposition	
Iraq	Patriotic Union of Kurdistan	PUK	18 / 329	In opposition	
Iraq	Kurdistan Socialist Democratic Party	KSDP	0 / 329	Extra-parliamentary opposition	
Ireland	Labour Party		11 / 160	In opposition	
Israel	The Democrats	HaDemokratim	8 / 120	In opposition	
Italy	Democratic Party	PD	68 / 400	In opposition	
Ivory Coast	Freedom and Democracy for the Republic	LIDER	0 / 255	Extra-parliamentary opposition	
Jordan	Jordanian Social Democratic Party	KPK	0 / 130	Extra-parliamentary opposition	
Kenya	Labour Party of Kenya	KLP	0 / 320	Extra-parliamentary opposition	
Kosovo	Vetëvendosje	LV	53 / 120	In government	
Kyrgyzstan	Social Democrats	SDK	0 / 90	Extra-parliamentary opposition	
Latvia	Social Democratic Party "Harmony"	SDPS	0 / 100	Extra-parliamentary opposition	
Lebanon	Progressive Socialist Party	PSP	8 / 128	In coalition	
Lithuania	Social Democratic Party of Lithuania	LSDP	52 / 141	In coalition	
Luxembourg	Luxembourg Socialist Workers' Party	LSAP	10 / 60	In opposition	
Macedonia	Social Democratic Union of Macedonia	SDSM	15 / 120	In opposition	
Malaysia	Democratic Action Party	DAP	40 / 222	In coalition	In coalition in Penang, Perak, Pahang and Selangor.
Mauritania	Rally of Democratic Forces	RFD	6 / 95	In opposition	
Mauritius	Mauritian Militant Movement	MMM	19 / 66	In coalition	
Mexico	Citizens' Movement	MC	29 / 500	In opposition	In government in Jalisco and Nuevo León, in coalition in Guanajuato and Yucatan.
Mexico	Party of the Democratic Revolution	PRD	0 / 500	In opposition	In coalition Aguascalientes, Chihuahua, Durango and Guanajuato.
Moldova	Democratic Party of Moldova	PDM	0 / 101	Extra-parliamentary opposition	
Mongolia	Mongolian People's Party	MPP	68 / 126	In government	
Montenegro	Democratic Party of Socialists of Montenegro	DPS	16 / 81	In opposition	
Montenegro	Social Democratic Party of Montenegro	SDP	0 / 81	Extra-parliamentary opposition	
Morocco	Socialist Union of Popular Forces	USFP	26 / 395	In coalition	
Myanmar	Democratic Party for a New Society	DPNS	0 / 440	Extra-parliamentary opposition	
Nepal	Nepali Congress	NC	38 / 275	In opposition	
Nepal	People's Socialist Party Nepal	PSP-N	0 / 275	Extra-parliamentary opposition	
Netherlands	Labour Party	PvdA/GL	25 / 150	In opposition	
New Zealand	New Zealand Labour Party	NZLP	34 / 123	In opposition	
Nicaragua	Democratic Renewal Union	UNAMOS	0 / 92	Extra-parliamentary opposition	
Niger	Nigerien Party for Democracy and Socialism	PNDS	0 / 171	Extra-parliamentary opposition	Banned after the 2023 Nigerien coup d'état by the National Council for the Safeguard of the Homeland.
North Macedonia	Social Democratic Union of Macedonia	SDSM	15 / 120	In opposition	
Northern Cyprus	Republican Turkish Party	CTP	18 / 50	In opposition	Northern Cyprus is not a UN-recognized state.
Norway	Labour Party	Ap	48 / 169	In government	
Palestine	Fatah		45 / 132	In government	
Palestine	Palestinian National Initiative	PNI	2 / 132	In opposition	
Paraguay	Party for a Country of Solidarity	PPS	1 / 80	In opposition	Affiliated with Guasú Front in national parliament.
Philippines	Akbayan Citizens' Action Party		3 / 318	In opposition	
Poland	New Left	NL	18 / 460	In government	
Portugal	Socialist Party	PS	58 / 230	In opposition	
Republic of Congo	Citizens' Convergence	CC	0 / 151	Extra-parliamentary opposition	
Romania	Social Democratic Party	PSD	89 / 330	In coalition	
Saint Lucia	Saint Lucia Labour Party	SLP	13 / 17	In government	
São Tomé and Príncipe	Movement for the Liberation of São Tomé and Príncipe/Social Democratic Party	MLSTP-PSD	18 / 55	In opposition	
Senegal	Socialist Party of Senegal	PS	0 / 150	Extra-parliamentary opposition	
Serbia	Democratic Party	DS	10 / 250	In opposition	
Slovenia	Social Democrats	SD	6 / 90	In opposition	
South Korea	Democratic Party of Korea	DPK	161 / 300	In government	
Spain	Spanish Socialist Workers' Party	PSOE	120 / 350	In coalition	
Sweden	Swedish Social Democratic Party	SAP	99 / 349	In opposition	
Switzerland	Social Democratic Party of Switzerland	SP	41 / 200	In coalition	
Syria	Syrian Democratic People's Party		0 / 250	Extra-parliamentary opposition	
Tanzania	Chama Cha Mapinduzi	CCM	398 / 403	In government	
Thailand	People's Party	PPLE	120 / 500	In opposition	In government in Lamphun. In coalition in Bangkok Metropolitan Council.
Timor-Leste	Revolutionary Front for an Independent East Timor	FRETILIN	19 / 65	In opposition	
Tunisia	Democratic Forum for Labour and Liberties	Ettakatol	0 / 217	Extra-parliamentary opposition	
Turkey	Republican People's Party	CHP	44 / 600	In opposition	The CHP lost 91 MPs in July 2026 after Özgür Özel and 90 other deputies left to establish the New Party.
Turkey	Peoples' Equality and Democracy Party	DEM	56 / 600	In opposition	
United Kingdom	Labour Party	Lab	404 / 650	In government	London Labour holds the London Mayoralty.
Uruguay	Socialist Party of Uruguay	PSU	3 / 99	In government	Affiliated with the Broad Front in the national parliament.
Venezuela	Movimiento al Socialismo	MAS	0 / 277	In opposition	Affiliated with the Democratic Alliance in the national parliament.
Western Sahara	Polisario Front		53 / 53	One-party state	Western Sahara is not a UN-recognized state.
Yemen	Yemeni Socialist Party	YSP	8 / 301	In opposition	
Zimbabwe	Movement for Democratic Change	MDC	0 / 210	Extra-parliamentary opposition	
Africa	Central African Progressive Alliance	APAC			
The Americas	Center for American Progress	CAP			
The Americas	Trade Union Confederation of the Americas	CSA			
Asia	Network of Social Democracy in Asia	SOCDEM			
Asia	Arab Social Democratic Forum	ASDF			
Europe	Party of European Socialists	PES			
Europe	Party of European Socialists Women	PES Women			
Europe	Young European Socialists	YES			
Europe	Foundation for European Progressive Studies	FEPS			
Europe	Socialist Group in the Council of Europe	SOC			
Europe	European Forum for Democracy and Solidarity				
European Union	Progressive Alliance of Socialists and Democrats	S&D	136 / 720		European Parliament
International	Socialist International Women	SIW			
International	International Union of Socialist Youth	IUSY			
International	International Trade Union Confederation	ITUC			
International	National Democratic Institute for International Affairs	NDI			
International	Olof Palme International Center	OPIC			
International	Trade Union Advisory Committee to the OECD	TUAC			
International	Association for Democratic Socialism				
International	CEE Gender Network				
International	Global Progressive Forum				
International	IndustriALL Global Union				
International	Just Jobs Network				
International	Solidar				

== Former members ==
- Georgia – Georgian Dream
- Israel – Israeli Labor Party and Meretz (both merged into The Democrats)
- Poland – Democratic Left Alliance (merged into New Left)
- Slovakia – Direction – Social Democracy
- Turkey – Peoples' Democratic Party (merged into Peoples' Equality and Democracy Party)
