= Moslem League of the Western Province =

Political party in Eritrea

The Moslem League of the Western Province was a political party in the Western Province, Eritrea. The party was founded by Sheikh Ali Radai, whose family originally migrated from the Hejaz region in Western Saudi Arabia and later became the President of the Eritrean Assembly. The party was formed after a split away from the Moslem League in 1949. The Moslem League of the Western Province was able to overtake half of the party membership of the pre-split Moslem League.

The historian Okbazgi Yohannes claims that the split was caused by intrigues on behalf of the British Military Administration, which was able to convince Muslim chiefs that the Moslem League leader Ibrahim Sultan Ali was an Italian agent. However this assertion is contested, as it overlooks internal social and political cleavages within the Eritrean Muslim community.

By late 1949, following the defection of the Independent Moslem League, the party left the Independence Bloc. The Muslim League of the Western Province became the second of various factions that departed from the Independence Bloc. The party sought to exclude Italian-Eritreans from the political process in the country, a policy that sharply contradicted the line of the Moslem League.

The party won 14 out of 68 seats in the 1952 Eritrean Assembly election (which was held through direct suffrage in some cities, and indirect vote in other areas).

Initially the Moslem League of the Western Province had called for continued British governance for a period of ten years, after which the future of the Western Province could be decided. In June 1953, nine months after the Federation between Ethiopia and Eritrea had come into effect, the party began calling for the creation of an independent Beja state, formed out of the Western Province of Eritrea and the Eastern Province of Sudan. However, as it became clear to the party that the British would not support creating an independent state out of the Western Province the party began supporting unification with Ethiopia. At this point integration into Ethiopia appeared more favourable to the party than a possible integration into Sudan, as it feared domination from Sudanese rival clans.
