= Fédération nationale des boulangers et pâtissiers du Burkina =

Trade union in Burkina Faso

F.N.B.P.B
- Fédération nationale des boulangers et pâtissiers du Burkina
- Founded: April 4, 1960
- Headquarters: Ouagadougou, Burkina Faso
- Location: Burkina Faso
- Key people: Djigimdé Tiga, president
- Affiliations: Confédération générale du travail du Burkina, IUF

Fédération nationale des boulangers et pâtissiers du Burkina (FNBPB) is a trade union of bakery workers in Burkina Faso. The union was founded on April 4, 1960. FNBPB is affiliated to Confédération générale du travail du Burkina (CGT-B). Djigimdé Tiga is the president of FNBPB.

FNBPB is a member of the International Union of Food, Agricultural, Hotel, Restaurant, Catering, Tobacco and Allied Workers' Association.
