= True Communists =

The True Communists (Russian: Истинные коммунисты, romanized: Istinnye kommunisty) were one of the first known clandestine anti-Stalinist Communist youth organizations of the pre-war period, which has been founded and operated in the city of Jalal-Abad, Kirghiz SSR, in 1940.

== Origins ==
In October 1940, senior pupils of Jalal-Abad School No. 1 Ivan Yatsuk and Yuri Shokk founded a group called "True Communists," which was later joined by other ninth graders. The core of the organization: Ivan Yatsuk, Yuri Shokk, Alexander Elin, Shamil Gubaidulin and Kamil Salakhutdinov – saw the regime established in the Soviet Union by Stalin as counter-revolutionary and set themselves the task to combat the activities of the Party and the government in order to return to Marxism not corrupted by the personality cult, hence the name.

The five members were of different social origin: Ivan Yatsuk and Alexander Yelin were from the families of farmers; Shamil Gubaidulin and Kamil Salahutdinov - from white collar families, while Yuri Shokk's parents were blue collar workers. Shokk's father was subjected to repressions in 1937, and his mother was deported from Leningrad in 1938.

== Activities ==
The group started to hold meetings, where they discussed certain actions of the CPSU and the government, planned group's activities, and studied the works of Marxist classics. Other students of the school were gradually involved in the group's activities, but following the production and distribution of "anti-Soviet" flyers, Ivan Yatsuk, Yuri Shokk and Alexander Yelin were arrested on December 19, 1940. Shamil Gubaidulin was put under arrest four days later. On January 26, 1941, the last one - Kamil Salakhutdinov – was taken into custody.

== Verdict ==
- As the founders of the "counter-revolutionary" group, tenth graders Ivan Yatsuk and Yuri Shokk were each sentenced to ten years in prison with disenfranchisement for five years.
- Their friends - Alexander Yelin and Shamil Gubaidulin – were sentenced to eight years in prison each, with disenfranchisement for three years.
- Kamil Salakhutdinov was sentenced to six years in prison with disenfranchisement for two years.
