= New Democracy Electoral Union =

New Democracy Electoral Union Nova Democracia União Eleitoral
- Chairman: Quintino de Moreira
- Founded: November 2006
- Registered: 2008

Party flag

New Democracy Electoral Union (Portuguese: Nova Democracia União Eleitoral) is a political coalition in Angola, founded November 18, 2006. The coalition was registered by the Supreme Court in June 2008, ahead of the September 2008 legislative election. Most of the constituents of the coalition had previously been affiliated to another coalition, Partidos da Opocição Civil. Quintino de Moreira is the president of the coalition. He is also the president of the MPDA.

Members of New Democracy Electoral Union:

- Angolan Union for Peace, Democracy and Development (UAPDD)
- Independent National Alliance of Angola (ANIA)
- Independent Social Party of Angola (PSIA)
- Liberal Socialist Party (PSL)
- Movement for the Democracy of Angola (MPDA)
- National Union for Democracy (UND)

The coalition received 1.20% of the vote in the 2008 election, winning two out of 220 seats.
