= Iraqi Communist Vanguard Organisation =

1979 Iraqi Political Organisation

Iraqi Communist Vanguard Organisation was a political organization in Iraq. The organisation was set up by the Baathist regime after the break between the Baath Party and the Iraqi Communist Party in 1979. The Iraqi Communist Vanguard Organisation was used by the regime to issue criticism against the Communist Party, claiming that the Communist Party had 'given up the struggle'.
