= National Union for Democracy =

Political party in Angola

National Union for Democracy União Nacional para a Democracia
- Founded: October 1991
- Dissolved: 1 May 2013
- National affiliation: New Democracy Electoral Union

National Union for Democracy (Portuguese: União Nacional para a Democracia) was a political party in Angola. The party was founded on 2 October 1991. The party was a member of the coalition New Democracy. The party was previously a member of the coalition Parties of the Civilian Opposition, but pulled out of it and took part in founding New Democracy in December 2006.
