= Organization of Iraqi Revolutionary Communists =

Cover of Al-Asas May 1980 issue, published after the killing of Ash-Shaikhli

Iraqi Revolutionary Communists (Arabic: تنظيم الشيوعيين الثوريين العراقيين) was the name of an Iraqi political organization, founded in 1973. The group was formed as a split from the Revolutionary Committee of the Iraqi Communist Party led by Salim al-Fakhri. The group was led by Tahsin Ali Ash-Shaikhli (alias 'Yahia al-Iraqi').

Ash-Shaikhli had been a student activist and joined the Revolutionary Committee in 1964. He was jailed in 1969. Following his release in 1970 he escaped to Jordan but left for Beirut following Black September. In Beirut Ash-Shaikhli maintained contacts with revolutionary leaders such as Abdullah Öcalan.

The Organization of Iraqi Revolutionary Communists called for complete rejection of Baathist rule and appealed for armed struggle against the regime. Moreover, it questioned why the Iraqi Communist Party had entered into an alliance with the Baathists, and issued criticism against perceived lack of internal democracy in the Communist Party.

The organization published a periodical called al-Asas from Beirut.

Ash-Shaikhli was assassinated in Beirut on March 24, 1980, allegedly by agents of the Iraqi regime. Another key cadre of the group, Ali, was killed in Kurdistan.
