= Eritrean Democratic Working People's Party =

Political party in Eritrea

The Eritrean Democratic Working People's Party, more commonly referred to as the Labour Party, was a clandestine political party in Eritrea. The party existed between 1968 and 1982, constituting the core of the Eritrean Liberation Front (ELF).

The party was founded by Marxists inside the ELF in November 1968. Amongst the founders were key ELF ideologues like Azein Yassin and Saleh Iyay. The goal of the party was the creation of an independent, socialist Eritrean state. It adhered to the Soviet-inspired 'Non-Capitalist Path of Development'. ELF leaders who were members of the party included Ahmed Nasser Mohammed, Abdellah Idris and Herui Tedla.

The party negotiated with the Eritrean People's Revolutionary Party about a merger of the ELF and the Eritrean People's Liberation Front, but these talks resulted fruitless.

The party was dissolved in 1982. Several key personalities of the party joined either the ELF faction of Abdellah Idris, or the ELF-Revolutionary Council. Another group, known as Sagem, joined the Eritrean People's Liberation Front in 1987 after the latter's second congress.
