= Progressive Party of Coahuila =

Progressive Party of Coahuila PRO
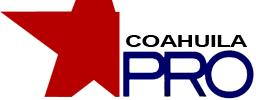
- Founder: Hugo Acosta
- Founded: 31 October 2011 (Partido Progresista); 16 February 2013 (PRO)
- Headquarters: Saltillo, Coahuila
- Ideology: Democratic socialism Social democracy Participatory democracy Progressivism
- Political position: Centre-left

Website
- www.pro.org.mx

The Progressive Party of Coahuila or PRO is a regional political party founded in the northern Mexican state of Coahuila de Zaragoza on October 2, 2011 in the city of Palaú. The members of this party are popularly known as progressive. Its motto is "For a Progressive Coahuila". Participated for the first time in elections for mayors 2013.

The Progressive Party of Coahuila was initially formed by the fall of 2011, it was not until the summer of 2012 that formally began its registration as a political party before the Local Electoral Institute, finally getting it in March 2013.

Since its registration, the PRO is considered the ruling established opposition party in the state, during the elections for mayor in 2013, formed an alliance with the National Action Party in several municipalities including the capital.
