= Oyggjaframi (M-L) =

Oyggjaframi (marx-leninistar)
- Headquarters: Tórshavn
- Ideology: Communism; Marxism-Leninism; Anti-revisionism; Maoism (Early); Hoxhaism (Late)
- Political position: Far-left

Oyggjaframi (marx-leninistar) (lit. 'Advancement for the Islands, Marxist-Leninist') or OFML was a communist organization in the Faroe Islands. The party was established in 1972 when it split from Oyggjaframi.

== History ==
=== Origins ===
In 1968 the Copenhagen-based Faroese association Oyggjaframi had founded a branch in Tórshavn. Whilst the Copenhagen branch continued to function as a broad socialist discussion club, a tendency emerged within the Tórshavn branch calling for the building of a communist party on the basis of Marxism-Leninism-Mao Zedong Thought. At the Oyggjaframi congress in 1972 the organization was split, with the Copenhagen branch continuing to function as Faroese Socialists and the Tórshavn branch constituting OFML.

=== Rhetoric ===
As of 1975, Hermann Oskarsson was chairman of OFML. The 1975 congress of OFML adopted 5 slogans outlining the priorities of the organization;

- Studies as the central activity
- Consolidate and expand democratic centralism
- Strike roots in the working class
- Lead the popular movement against the EEC
- Publish a communist workers newspaper

OFML published the first issue of Arbeiðið May 1, 1976.

Initially OF(m-l) took part in the Nordic cooperation of Marxist-Leninist parties that included Arbeidernes Kommunistparti of Norway, Kommunistiska Förbundet Marxist-Leninisterna of Sweden, Kommunistisk Arbejderparti of Denmark, Marxist-Leninist Groups of Finland, and Einingarsamtök Kommúnista (marx-lenínistar) of Iceland. When the Sino-Albanian split occurred, OFML and EIK(ml) followed the People's Republic of Albania.

During its last years, OFML kept close contacts with the pro-Albanian Danish Danmarks Kommunistiske Parti/Marxister-Leninister.
