= Better Poland =

Polish political party

Better Poland Lepsza Polska
- Abbreviation: LP
- Leader: Cezary Stachoń
- Founded: 9 August 2010
- Registered: 10 August 2010
- Headquarters: ul. 1-go Sierpnia 36 lok. 22 02-134 Warsaw
- Ideology: Green politics Egalitarianism; Solidarism; Degrowth
- Political position: Left-wing
- Colours: Red; Green
- Sejm: 0 / 460
- Senate: 0 / 100
- European Parliament: 0 / 51
- Regional assemblies: 0 / 552
- City presidents: 0 / 117

Website
- www.lepszapolska.com

Better Poland (Polish: Lepsza Polska, LP) is a minor Polish green party. It was founded on 9 August 2010 and registered the next day. The party was founded by an environmental activist Cezary Stachoń, as well as his family and friends. The founder of the party, Cezary Stachoń, ran for the Mayor of Warsaw in 2010. He won 624 votes, obtaining 0.10% of the popular vote in Warsaw. The party did not stand in any other Polish elections since then. Despite its inactivity, the party is still registered and submits financial reports as of 2023.

The party is mainly concerned with environmental issues and sustainability. Better Poland argues that the Polish environment is in tragic shape and advocates extensive measures to alleviate this. The party believes that Poland needs to stop coal exploitation and move beyond other unsustainable energy sources such as natural gas in favour of renewable energy. The party also argues that because of declining availability of energy sources and eroding environment, it is necessary to reduce the consumption of energy and other resources, even if by a small amount.

== History ==
On 5 March 2010, Cezary Stachoń wrote a letter to the Prime Minister of Poland Donald Tusk, warning the minister of dire issues in Poland such as energy insecurity, progressing destruction of the environment, wealth inequality and housing insecurity. Stachoń called for sustainable and ecological policies that would save the Polish environment while also alleviating the plight of the poorest parts of the population.

As the letter went unanswered, Stachoń decided to found his own party. The party was founded on 9 August 2010, and was formally registered the next day. Cezary Stachoń became the president of the party, while Władysław Stachoń was chosen as the party's treasures. One of the co-founders was also Wioleta Rydzewska.

In October 2010, Cezary Stachoń became one of eleven candidates for the Mayor of Warsaw, seeking to defeat the incumbent Hanna Gronkiewicz-Waltz from the Civic Platform.

While Stachoń was only a minor candidate, his young age was highlighted - he was only 35 at the time, being the youngest candidate in the election. Rzeczpospolita labelled him the "youth representative". In interviews, Stachoń particularly focused on his plan to move away from coal by building energy-efficient 'passive houses', which would consume six to eight times less energy than traditional ones. He also discussed the importance of improving and encouraging public transport, as well as promoting healthy and green lifestyle.

Cezary Stachoń participated in all three debates organised for the candidates for Mayor of Warsaw. He campaigned on environmental issues while also offering proposals for solving the traffic problems of the city and pledged to start developing the schools of Warsaw, which he believed to be neglected.

The incumbent mayor Hanna Gronkiewicz-Waltz won the election by a large margin. Stachoń gained a total of 624 votes, winning 0.10% of the popular vote.

Following the 2010 Warsaw mayoral election, the party did not participate in any other Polish election. However, the party continues to exist, and regularly submits financial reports as of 2023.

== Ideology ==
The party promotes green politics, degrowth and environmentalism, while at the same time being concerned with social justice and egalitarianism. Better Poland believes that the Polish state must protest the Polish environment as well as the poorest and weakest parts of the society, regardless of the tight budgetary situation. The party argues that the Polish healthcare is sorely lacking, and advocates for programs such as free hot meals at schools and free dental care for everyone.

Better Poland highlights that while there is a house shortage in Poland, it must be ensured that new housing will be sustainable and energy-efficient, and that any housing projects should be either carbon-neutral or come at a minimal cost for the environment.

The party is highly critical of economic conservatism and the concept of "balancing the budget", arguing that those politicians who refuse to fund welfare and enact austerity policies are also willing to finance foreign wars (here the party mentions Polish involvement in War in Afghanistan) and cut taxes for the wealthiest people at the same time. The party calls for a progressive tax, while highlighting that the richest citizens should be aggressively taxed while the poorest should not pay taxes at all.

Better Poland promotes an economic system based on solidarism and subsidiarity, listing deepening wealth inequality as one of the largest problems of the Polish society. The party believes that Poland needs an economic system that will secure the basic needs of every citizen. The party particularly highlights the need to aid the lowest earners and the unemployed. The party calls for a much higher minimum wage and unemployment pension, while also proposing additional, high pensions for marginalised social groups such as disabled people, single mothers and pensioners. Better Poland condemns the current economic system in which "people are determined by their bank balance".

Lastly, the party argues that decisive and immediate action needs to be taken in order to save the Polish environment from looming destruction, highlighting progressing biodiversity loss and increasing air pollution. The party promotes biomass energy and renewable energy, believing that Poland has a "deadly addiction" to finite energy sources such as coal as well as natural gas.

The party also promotes degrowth, arguing that apart from phasing out environmentally-destructive energy in favour of a green one, the current levels of consumption are too high and unsustainable. Better Poland argues that even a small but permanent reduction in total energy consumption would go a long way towards ensuring the survival of Polish environment. The party proposes that usage of street lighting be reduced and school holidays be extended in order to minimise energy consumption.

Better Poland also opposes genetically modified organisms, seeing as highly harmful to the environment. The party argues that the usage of GMO in farming disrupts local ecosystems by reducing the bee population, and also states the GMOs cause more chemical fertilisation and spraying, which significantly depletes and pollutes the soil. The party warns that "with further development in this inappropriate direction, plants, cereals, fruit trees may not produce the yields necessary to maintain self-sufficiency in food".

== See also ==
- The Greens (Poland)
- Polish Party of Animal Protection
- Poland 2050
- Agreement for the Future – CenterLeft
