= Liberal Socialist Party (Angola) =

Political party in Angola

Liberal Socialist Party Partido Socialista Liberal
- Founded: February 16, 1993
- Dissolved: May 1, 2013
- Split from: Parties of the Civilian Opposition
- Ideology: Social democracy Democratic socialism Liberal socialism Left-wing nationalism Left-wing populism
- Political position: Centre-left
- National affiliation: New Democracy Electoral Union

The Liberal Socialist Party (Portuguese: Partido Socialista Liberal) was a political party in Angola. It was founded on February 16, 1993. The party was a member of the coalition New Democracy. The party was previously a member of the coalition Parties of the Civilian Opposition, but pulled out of it and took part in founding New Democracy in December 2006.
