= Communist Revolution Movement/Leninist (Turkey) =

KDH/L symbol

Communist Revolution Movement/Leninist (Turkish: Komünist Devrim Hareketi/Leninist) is a clandestine communist organization in Turkey. KDH/L was founded in 1999, following a split from the Communist Revolution Movement (KDH). KDH/L accused KDH of opportunism.

KDH/L publishes Proleter Devrimci KöZ.

The legal front of KDH/L is the Revolutionary Party Forces/Leninist (Devrimci Parti Güçleri/Leninist).
