= Faroese Socialists =

Group operating on the political left founded by Faroese students in Denmark in 1962

- Founded: 1962
- Headquarters: Tórshavn (Early)
- Ideology: Socialism; Anti-atlanticism; Faroese independence Faroese nationalism Left-wing nationalism
- Political position: Left-wing

Føroyskir Sosialistar (English: Faroese Socialists) or FS was a left-wing political party founded by Faroese students in Denmark in 1962.

== History ==
The party was first established in 1962 by Faroese students in Denmark under the name Oyggjaframi (lit. 'Advancement for the Islands'). Initially the group was linked to Tjóðveldisflokkurin, but due to increasing communist influence in Oyggjaframi the party eventually broke relations with the group. In 1969 Oyggjaframi changed its name to Oyggjaframi–Føroyskir Sosialistar (English: Advancement for the Islands—Faroese Socialists). In 1972, the Tórshavn chapter of the party broke away to form Oyggjaframi (M-L). The remaining group was renamed Føroyskir Sosialistar.

FS fought for the creation of a Faroese socialist republic and actively struggled against NATO. At the World Federation of Democratic Youth General Assembly in Varna, Bulgaria in 1974 FS was accepted as a member.

FS published the monthly magazine Framin, which carried the subtitle Føroyskt tíðarrit fyri sosialismu og sjálvstýri (English: Faroese magazine for socialism and independence) between 1962 and 1984 and Roðin between 1971 and 1982.
