= Independent Social Party of Angola =

Political party in Angola

Independent Social Party of Angola Partido Social Independente de Angola
- Founded: July 1993
- Dissolved: 1 May 2013
- National affiliation: New Democracy Electoral Union

The Independent Social Party of Angola (Portuguese: Partido Social Independente de Angola) was a political party in Angola. The party was founded on July 27, 1993. The party was a member of the coalition New Democracy. The party was previously a member of the coalition Parties of the Civilian Opposition, but pulled out of it and took part in founding New Democracy in December 2006.
