= Workers' Party of Turkey =

Workers' Party of Turkey may refer to:

- Workers' Party of Turkey (1961)
- Workers' Party of Turkey (2010)
- Workers' Party of Turkey (2017)
- Workers' Party (Turkey)
