= Socialist Democratic Party (Chile) =

- Leader: Eduardo Frei Montalva
- Founded: 1 September 1964
- Dissolved: 1965
- Ideology: Social democracy
- Political position: Centre-left

The Socialist Democratic Party (Spanish: Partido Democrático Socialista) was a political party in Chile. It was founded in 1964, through the merger of the Socialist People's Party, the National Left Movement and some sectors of the erstwhile Democratic Party (the ones that had not merged into the National Democratic Party). PDS contested the 1965 parliamentary election, but failed to win any seats. The party was dissolved shortly thereafter.
