= Society First =

Society First Η Κοινωνία Πρώτα Society First
- Founded: 24 April 2013
- Ideology: Socialism
- Political position: Left-wing
- National affiliation: Coalition of the Radical Left

Society First is a Greek political party founded by independent MPs Paris Moutsinas (Magnesia) and (Athens B) and the politicians Stefanos Katsaras (Karditsa Prefecture). The party was founded in Athens on 24 April 2013 along with a number of other politicians derived basically from the Democratic Left, and many non-party citizens.
