= Movement for the Democracy of Angola =

Political party in Angola

Movement for the Democracy of Angola Movimento para a Paz e Desenvolvimento de Angola
- Chairman: Massunguna da Silva Pedro
- Founded: 4 July 2004
- Dissolved: 1 May 2013
- National affiliation: New Democracy Electoral Union

The Movement for Peace and Development for Angola (Portuguese: Movimento para a Paz e Desenvolvimento de Angola, MPDA) was a political party in Angola. Massunguna da Silva Pedro was the president of the party. MPDA was a member of the coalition United Patriotic Movement, of which Mr. Massunguna da Silva Pedro also was a member. The party was founded on July 4, 2004.
