= United Democrats (Denmark) =

United Democrats Forenede Demokrater
- Leader: Britta Johansson
- Founded: April 2013
- Ideology: Centre-left

Election symbol
- J

Website
- fordem.dk

United Democrats (Danish: Forenede Demokrater, FD) is a political party in Denmark.

== History ==
United Democrats was founded in 2013, and ran for municipal council that year in Assens, Frederikshavn, Kalundborg, Morsø, Thisted, Helsingør and Copenhagen Municipality. They did not win any seats in any of those municipalities.

== Election results ==
=== Municipal elections ===
Date	Seats	
Date	#	±
2013	0 / 2,444	New
