= Independent National Alliance of Angola =

Political party in Angola

- Leader: José Fernando Fula 'Tó Zé'
- Founded: April 1995
- Dissolved: 1 May 2013
- National affiliation: New Democracy Electoral Union

Independent National Alliance of Angola (ANIA, Portuguese: Aliança Nacional Independente de Angola) was a political party in Angola. ANIA was founded on April 11, 1995. The party was a member of the coalition New Democracy. It was led by former National Liberation Front of Angola (FNLA) youth leader, José Fernando Fula 'Tó Zé'.
