= Radicals (Greece) =

Radicals Ριζοσπάστες Rizospastes
- Founded: 2009
- Split from: Active Citizens
- Ideology: Democratic socialism Left-wing nationalism
- Political position: Left-wing
- National affiliation: Coalition of the Radical Left

Website
- Official site

Radicals (Greek: Ριζοσπάστες) was a left-wing political party in Greece and member of the Coalition of the Radical Left. It was founded in 2009 following a split from Active Citizens.
