= Angolan Union for Peace, Democracy and Development =

Political party in Angola

Angolan Union for Peace, Democracy and Development União Angolana Pela Paz Democracia e Desenvolvimento
- Founded: February 1994
- Dissolved: 1 May 2013
- National affiliation: New Democracy Electoral Union

Angolan Union for Peace, Democracy and Development (Portuguese: União Angolana Pela Paz Democracia e Desenvolvimento, UADPP) was a political party in Angola. The party was founded on February 16, 1994. The party was a member of the coalition New Democracy.
