= Pan Africanist Socialist Movement – Inkinzo =

Political party in Burundi

Pan Africanist Socialist Movement - Inkinzo
- Founded: Unknown
- Ideology: Pan-Africanism; African socialism Socialism; Progressivism

The Pan Africanist Socialist Movement-Inkinzo (MSP-Inkinzo) is a small progressive, predominantly ethnic Tutsi political party in Burundi.
