= Independent Moslem League =

Political party in Eritrea

The Independent Moslem League, sometimes referred to as the Independent Moslem League of Massawa, was a political party in Eritrea. It was formed through a split in the Moslem League, founded by Moslem League members from the central and eastern provinces of Eritrea. Mohammed Omer Cadi was the president of the party.

== Formation ==
IML was initially a constituent of the Independence Bloc. However, the IML began to see the Bloc as dominated by Italian interests, and by 1949 it had broken away from it. The IML was the first of various Independence Bloc factions to desert the Bloc.

== Political activities ==
At the time of the split from the Moslem League, the IML held negotiations with representatives of the Ethiopian government. The Ethiopians offered the IML assurances that if Eritrea enter into union with Ethiopia, Islamic traditions would be respected and schools would teach in Arabic language alongside Amharic. After receiving these assurances the IML opted for support of a union between Eritrea and Ethiopia, fearing that an independent Eritrean state could be dominated by Italian settlers. In areas like Keren and around Massawa, the IML was able to mobilize significant sectors in support of the unionist cause.

In mid-October 1953, the IML, Moslem League and the National Party sent a joint telegram to the United Nations. The telegram was significant as it marked the beginning of protests against Tedla Bairu's cabinet. Furthermore, it was notable that, for the first time in the telegram the Muslim political parties argued in favour of rights for the Muslim population on the basis of their religious identity.
