= Coordination Council of Leftist Forces =

Political alliance in Azerbaijan

The Coordination Council of Leftist Forces was a left-wing political alliance in Azerbaijan founded by initiative of Musa Tukanov, a member of the Baku City Party Committee of the United Communist Party of Azerbaijan (AVKP).

In May 2002, Tukanov proposed to set up the Coordination Council of Leftist Forces. Besides his faction of the AVKP, known as AVKP-2, the Bolsheviks' Organization and the Labors' Union, also Azerbaijan Communist Party (on Platform of Marxism-Leninism) (a party that was formed in 2000, following a split from the AVKP itself) led by Telman Nurullayev intended to join to the CCLF.

CCLF is created with the purpose of consolidation of the efforts of the leftist forces "at the struggle for socialism". Founders are trying to change "raptorial capitalist regime". In the words of Tukanov, AVKP-2 and its allies support changing the power through democratic methods in the country. Nevertheless, Tukanov does not also except the revolution way and in his opinion, "revolutionary situation must itself be grown". AVKP-2 supports Azerbaijan's unification to Belarus and Russia union. As to the idea of restoration of the USSR, in Tukanov's opinion, it should take place through a referendum. He thinks if "the representatives of workers" come to power in Azerbaijan, Armenia and Russia, Nagorno-Karabakh conflict will also be settled.
