= Liberal Progressive Party (Eritrea) =

Political party in Eritrea

The Eritrea for Eritreans Party (Ertra n'ertrawian), also known as the Liberal Progressive Party (LPP) was a political party in Eritrea. The party was founded on February 18, 1947 in Adi Keyh. It was a secular party dominated by Christians. It opposed union with Ethiopia. The party program accepted the notion of a U.S. trusteeship as intermediary step towards independence. The party gathered a membership of 53,500.

The party emerged from the separatist movement that had been nurtured by the British Military Administration. The name 'Liberal Progressive Party' was a name accorded to the party by the British Military Administration. At times the party was known as the Liberation and Development Party of Eritrea - Eritrea for Eritreans (Mahber harnet 'n limaa't ertra - ertra n'etrawian). The party was allegedly set up by Stephen Hemsley Longrigg. The influence of the party was limited to a small area in Akele Guzai and some circles in Asmara. Its main leaders were Ras Tessema Asberom and Seyoum Maascio. Woldeab Woldemariam was another prominent leader of the party.

According to an estimate made by the Four Powers Commission prior to the election, the party was supported by 9% of the population. The main opponent of LPP was the Unionist Party, which used its religious networks against the LPP. The Ethiopian Orthodox Church threatened LPP supporters with excommunication. The unionists carried out many violent attacks against the LPP, which weakened the party.

In 1949 the party was registered as the Freedom and Development Party of Eritrea (Mahber natznet'n limaa't ertra), sometimes shortened to just Freedom Party of Eritrea. In the same year the party took part in founding the Independence Bloc together with the Moslem League and the Pro-Italy Party.

Following the departure of the Four Powers Commission, the LPP was weakened by internal splits. Woldeab Woldemariam left the party to form a group of his own. The party was dissolved in December 1950.
