= Cyprus Social Ecology Movement =

Cyprus Social Ecology Movement Κίνημα Κοινωνικής Οικολογίας Κύπρου
- Leader: Athos Agapitos
- Founded: 2009
- Headquarters: Nicosia, Cyprus
- Ideology: Social ecology
- International affiliation: Global Greens
- Colours: Green, Red

Website
- https://cyprusgreens.blogspot.com/

The Cyprus Social Ecology Movement (Greek: Κίνημα Κοινωνικής Οικολογίας (ΚΚΟ), Kinima koinonikis oikologias, KKO) is an ecosocialist political party in Cyprus. The party was founded in 2009 and has developed strong social and environmental activities, covering a great number of actions to support several groups in Cyprus and support their rights in both social matters and environmental issues.

KKO has strong collaboration binds with the Coalition of the Radical Left (SYRIZA) of Greece, the Ecologist Greens of Greece and the New Cyprus Party (Turkish Cypriot party).
