= Collective of Democratic Mass Organizations and Political Parties =

The Collective of Democratic Mass Organizations and Political Parties (French: Collectif des Organisations Démocratiques de Masse et de Partis Politiques, CODMPP) is a political alliance in Burkina Faso (former Upper Volta). It was founded in December 1998 by leftist political parties, unions and NGOs.

The CODMPP is led by Halidou Ouédraogo.
