= Eritrean People's Revolutionary Party =

Political party in Eritrea

The Eritrean People's Revolutionary Party (EPRP) was a clandestine Marxist-Leninist political party in Eritrea during that country's war of independence. Founded in 1971 and associated with the Eritrean People's Liberation Front, it was chaired by future Eritrean president Isaias Afewerki. The EPRP was dissolved in 1989.
