= Eritrean People's Democratic Front =

Political party in Eritrea

EPDF symbol

The Eritrean People's Democratic Front (Arabic: الجبهة الديموقراطية الشعبية الإرترية) is an Eritrean opposition group. EPDF was founded in 2004 by the People's Democratic Front for the Liberation of Eritrea (SAGEM) and a group who left the Eritrean Revolutionary Democratic Front (ERDF). EPDF is led by Tewelde Ghebreselassie.
