= 2017 Turkish constitutional referendum "No" campaign =

Başkanlığa Hayır
- Campaign: 2017 Turkish constitutional referendum
- Affiliation: Republican People's Party; Peoples' Democratic Party; Nationalist Movement Party factions Other smaller parties and organisations (See list)
- Status: Lost referendum; 'Yes' campaign successful and constitutional package passed
- Slogan(s): 'Geleceğim için Hayır' (No for my future) 'Demokratik Cumhuriyet Ortak Vatan İçin Hayır' (No for a Democratic and Common Homeland)
- Chant: Başkanlığa Hayır (No to an executive presidency)

The 2017 Turkish constitutional referendum 'No' campaign (Turkish: Hayır) refers to a collection of unsuccessful political campaigns led by political parties, organizations and media outlets in favour of a 'No' vote in the 2017 Turkish constitutional referendum. Were the campaign to have been successful, it would have resulted in Turkey remaining a parliamentary republic as opposed to an executive presidency, which it became as a result of the referendum, and would have constituted the first direct upset against the governing Justice and Development Party (AKP) since they took office in 2002.

'No' campaigners faced alleged government-backed coercion and suppression. On 1 March, the main opposition Republican People's Party (CHP) unveiled a 78-point report regarding irregularities and suppression of 'No' campaigners, with Deputy Leader Öztürk Yılmaz claiming that those who were campaigning for a 'No' vote faced fear and state coercion. CHP parliamentary group leader Engin Altay also criticized the government for using state funds to fund the 'Yes' campaign while repressing 'No' voters, claiming that their conduct did not allow them to talk of 'democracy'.

A 'No' vote was supported by the main opposition party, CHP, and the smaller opposition Peoples' Democratic Party (HDP). Over 40 smaller political parties were also in favour of a 'No' vote, as well as a significant number of Nationalist Movement Party (MHP) politicians and voters who opposed their leader President Recep Tayyip Erdogan's call for a 'Yes' vote. The main rival to the 'No' campaign, which did not have a centralized or united structure, was the 'Yes' campaign.

The 'No' option on the ballot paper used for the referendum was coloured in a light brown.

== Supporters ==
=== Political parties ===
The following political parties supported a 'No' vote in 2017:

Party		Leader	Political orientation	Ref.
CHP	Republican People's Party	Kemal Kılıçdaroğlu	Kemalism	
MHP	Nationalist Movement Party inner-party factions	Collective leadership	Nationalism	
HDP	Peoples' Democratic Party	Selahattin Demirtaş & Figen Yüksekdağ	Left-wing	
Saadet	Felicity Party	Temel Karamollaoğlu	Right-wing	
BBP	Great Union Party inner-party factions	Collective leadership	Far right	
Vatan	Patriotic Party	Doğu Perinçek	Kemalism	
HAK-PAR	Rights and Freedoms Party	Refik Karakoç	pro-Kurdish	
HKP	People's Liberation Party	Nurullah Ankut	Communism	
DP	Democrat Party	Gültekin Uysal	Centre-right	
KP	Communist Party	Arif Hikmet Basa	Communism	
DSP	Democratic Left Party	Önder Aksakal	Centre-left	
LDP	Liberal Democratic Party	Gültekin Tırpancı	Liberalism	
MP	Nation Party	Aykut Edibali	Nationalism	
DYP	True Path Party	Çetin Özaçıkgöz	Centre-right	
TSİP	Socialist Workers' Party of Turkey	Turgut Koçak	Socialism	
TKP	Communist Party of Turkey	Hüseyin Karabulut	Communism	
ÖDP	Freedom and Solidarity Party	Collective leadership	Left-wing	
EMEP	Labour Party	Selma Gürkan	Communism	
DSİP	Revolutionary Socialist Workers' Party	Meltem Oral & Şenol Karakaş	Left-wing	
YP	Homeland Party	Sadettin Tantan	Nationalism	
AYP	Crescent Star Party	Serap Gülhan	Kemalism	
EHP	Labourist Movement Party	Sibel Uzun	Left-wing	
İKP	Workers' Fraternity Party	Mehmet Şadi Ozansü	Left-wing	
DİP	Revolutionist Workers' Party	Ömer Sungur Savran	Socialism	
DBP	Democratic Regions Party	Emine Ayna	pro-Kurdish	
HEPAR	Rights and Equality Party	Yücel Savaş	Nationalism	
ESP	Socialist Party of the Oppressed	Sultan Ulusoy	Far-left	
TİKP	Workers Villagers Party of Turkey	İsmail Durna	Left	
ANAP	Motherland Party	İbrahim Çelebi	Centre-right	
Dev-Parti	Revolutionary People's Party	Celal Özcan	Left-wing	
MTP	Nationalist Turkey Party	Ahmet Yılmaz Büyükekmekci	Nationalism	
ÖSP	Freedom and Socialism Party	Sinan Çiftyürek	Far-left	
1920 TKP	Socialist Liberation Party	Şener Ataş	Communism	
Yeşil Sol	Greens and the Left Party of the Future	Naci Sönmez	Green politics	
TİVEP	Unemployed's and Labourers' Party of Turkey	Rıfat Derya Sercan	Centre-left	
SYKP	Socialist Refoundation Party	Tülay Hatimoğlulları Oruç	Far-left	
KP	Women's Party	Benal Yazgan	Feminism	
TURAN	Great Turan Movement Party	Varol Esen	Ultra nationalism	
HHP	Rights and Peace Party	Gürsel Yıldız	Centre	
HTKP	People's Communist Party of Turkey	Emre Yağan	Communism	
CİHAP	Universe Party	Kürşad Emre Öğretmek	Centre	
Anayol	Main Path Party	Zafer Maden	Centre-right	
TÜHAP	People's Party of Turkey	Mehmet Çetin	Centre	
MMP	National Struggle Party	Ahmet Kaya	Nationalism	
ASP	AS Party	Cavit Kayıkcı	Nationalism	
İDP	Workers' Democracy Party	Oktay Çelik	Left-wing	
TKH	Communist Movement of Turkey	Erkan Pınarbaşı	Communism	
Devrimci	United Revolutionist Party	Ufuk Göllü	Left-wing	
AP	Justice Party	Vecdet Öz	Centre-right	
TBP	Unity Party of Turkey	Hüseyin Ekici	Kemalism	
SEP	Socialist Laborers' Party	Gökçe Şentürk	Socialism	
EYP	Universal Path Party	Metin Güler	Alevism	
Büyük	Great Turkey Party	Tevfik Diker	Centre-right	
DGP	Democratic Young Party	Erkin Çözeli	Centre	
Ulusal Parti	National Party	Gökçe Fırat Çulhaoğlu	Third Position	

=== Organisations ===
The following organizations favoured a 'No' vote:

NGO	Type	Political orientation	Ref.
Union of Chambers of Turkish Engineers and Architects (TMMOB)	Trade union	Centre-left	
Turkish Medical Association (TTB)	Medical union	Centre-left	
MHP Dissidents	Intra-party opposition	Nationalism	
BBP Dissidents	Intra-party opposition	Far-right	
Confederation of Public Workers' Unions of Turkey (Türkiye Kamu-Sen)	Trade union	Centre-right	
Confederation of Public Workers' Unions (KESK)	Trade union	Left-wing	
Confederation of Progressive Trade Unions of Turkey (DİSK)	Trade union	Left-wing	
United Confederation of Public Employees' Unions (Birleşik Kamu-İş)	Trade union	Kemalism	
Atatürkist Thought Association (ADD)		Kemalism	
Youth Union of Turkey (TGB)	Youth organisation	Kemalism	
Republican Women's Association (CKD)	Women organization	Kemalism	
Retired Military Officers Association of Turkey (TESUD)	Military veterans organization	Kemalism	
Artists' Union of Turkey (TSB)	Art organization	Kemalism	
Artists' Initiative	Art organization	Left-wing	
Turkish Law Institution	Institution	Kemalism	
National Constitution Movement	Think tank	Kemalism	
Intellectuals' Hearth		Nationalism	
Confederation of Turkish Tribes (TÜRKBOY)		Nationalism	
Social Thought Association (TDD)		Nationalism	
Turkish Left	Magazine	Third Position	

== Republican People's Party (CHP) campaign ==
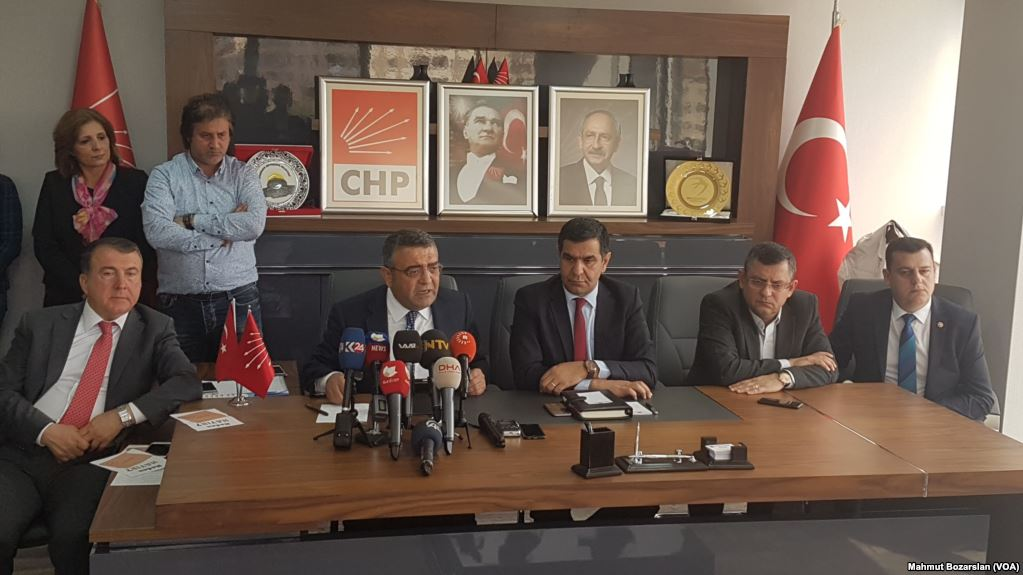
CHP MPs holding a press conference in Diyarbakır after campaigning for a 'No' vote

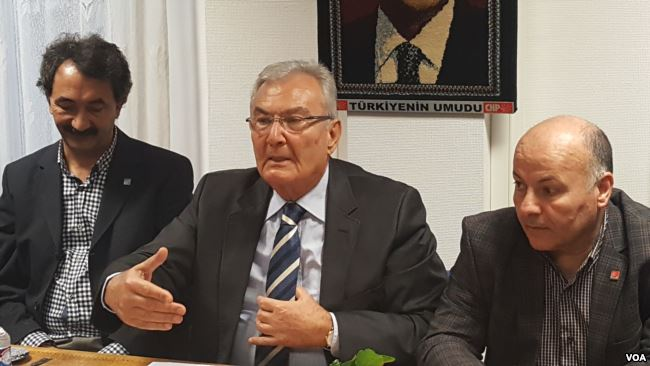
CHP former leader Deniz Baykal at a 'No' campaign event in France

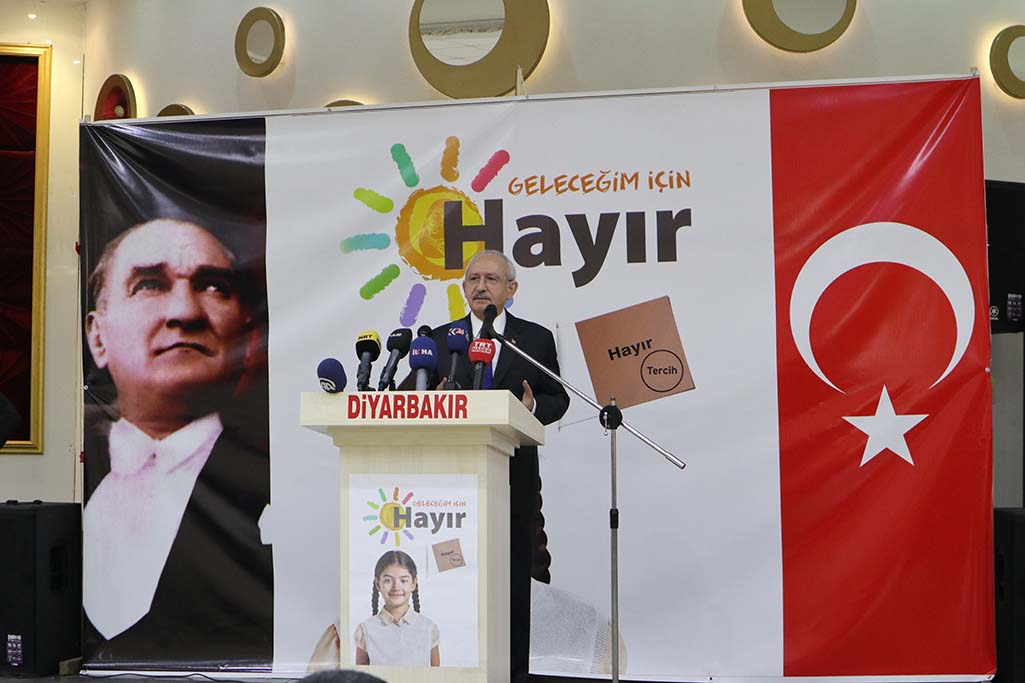
CHP leader Kemal Kılıçdaroğlu addressing a 'No' rally in Diyarbakır

The Republican People's Party (CHP) held a pre-campaign rally in Adana on 3 December 2016, titled 'We will not partition Turkey'. The rally was also supported by Idealists, who traditionally support the MHP. The CHP parliamentary group voted against the proposals in Parliament but was unable to block their approval. On 15 February 2017, it was announced that the CHP wouldn't refer the voting process, which had been marred by unconstitutional open voting by AKP MPs, to the Constitutional Court, claiming that they believed that voters would reject the proposals at the ballot box.

On 6 February, the CHP unveiled a 10-article booklet detailing the reasons why they supported a 'No' vote, with the 10 key points being opposition to a 'one-man regime', a party state, the end of powers of Parliament, a government without scrutiny, a biased judiciary, en economic crisis, terrorism, the erosion of fundamental and universal values, to partitioning Turkey and an 'elected monarchy'. This followed on from a 21 December 2016 publication released by CHP Deputy Leader Bülent Tezcan, containing 35 questions and answers about the proposed presidential system.

On 28 February, the CHP unveiled their campaign, under the slogan ‘Geleceğim İçin Hayır’ ('No' for my future). It was stated that party logos would not be used during the campaign. The party also unveiled its first official campaign rally to be at Amasya, though one of the party's dissident MPs Muharrem İnce held a rally at Alaplı, Zonguldak Province on 8 March. Also on 8 March International Women's Day, the CHP Women's Wing in İzmir held an event where participants spelled out the word 'No' with their bodies, with the scene captured by helicopter. The event was also attended by party leader Kemal Kılıçdaroğlu's wife Selvi and Deputy Leader Selin Sayek Böke.

Many CHP MPs began visiting different areas of Turkey and Turkish expats abroad in order to gather support for a 'No' vote soon after the referendum date was announced. The party's former leader Deniz Baykal attended an event in France while Istanbul Member of Parliament Sezgin Tanrıkulu and parliamentary group leader Özgür Özel led a group of MPs to Diyarbakır where the party has no representation.

At the start of the campaign, party leader Kemal Kılıçdaroğlu reportedly asked the party's officials to conduct the 'No' campaign on a purely positive basis, refraining from using a negative or alienating discourse. It was also reported that the CHP were getting ready to make a campaign film similar to the 'No' campaign for the Chilean national plebiscite of 1988, which resulted in a victory for the 'No' side and an eventual end to the regime of Augusto Pinochet.
