= 2017 Turkish constitutional referendum =

- 16 April 2017
- Vote on 18 proposed amendments to the constitution

Results
Choice	Votes	%
Yes	25,157,463	51.41%
No	23,779,141	48.59%
Valid votes	48,936,604	98.27%
Invalid or blank votes	862,251	1.73%
Total votes	49,798,855	100.00%
Registered voters/turnout	58,291,898	85.43%
- Results by province (yes in blue)

- Results by foreign nation (yes in blue)

A constitutional referendum was held in Turkey on 16 April 2017 on whether to approve 18 proposed amendments to the Turkish constitution that were brought forward by the governing Justice and Development Party (AKP) and the Nationalist Movement Party (MHP). As a result of its approval, the office of prime minister was abolished and the existing parliamentary system of government was replaced with an executive presidency and a presidential system. The number of seats in Parliament was raised from 550 to 600, while, among a series of other proposals, the president was given more control over appointments to the Supreme Board of Judges and Prosecutors (HSYK). The referendum was held under a state of emergency that was declared following the failed military coup attempt in July 2016.

Early results indicated a 51–49% lead for the "Yes" vote. In an unprecedented move, the Supreme Electoral Council (YSK) allowed non-stamped ballots to be accepted as valid. Some critics of the reform decried this move to be illegal, claiming that as many as 1.5 million ballots were unstamped, and did not recognize the results. Large-scale protests erupted following the results in order to protest the YSK's decision. In subsequent reports, the Organization for Security and Co-operation in Europe (OSCE) and Parliamentary Assembly of the Council of Europe (PACE) both criticized unfairness during the campaign and declared the YSK's decision to be illegal.

An executive presidency was a long-standing proposal of the governing AKP and its founder, the current President of Turkey, Recep Tayyip Erdoğan. In October 2016, the Nationalist Movement Party (MHP) announced its co-operation for producing draft proposals with the government, with the combined support of both AKP and MHP MPs being sufficient to put forward the proposals to a referendum following a parliamentary vote in January. Those in favour of a "Yes" vote argued that the changes were necessary for a strong and stable Turkey, arguing that an executive presidency would bring about an end to unstable coalition governments that had dominated Turkish politics since the 1960s up until 2002. The "No" campaign argued that the proposals would concentrate too much power in the hands of the President, effectively dismantling the separation of powers and taking legislative authority away from Parliament. Three days before the referendum, one of Erdoğan's aides called for a federal system should the "Yes" vote prevail, causing a backlash from the pro-Yes MHP. Both sides of the campaign were accused of using divisive and extreme rhetoric, with Erdoğan accusing "No" voters of being terrorists siding with the plotters of the failed 2016 coup.

The campaign was marred by allegations of state suppression against "No" campaigners, while the "Yes" campaign was able to make use of state facilities and funding to organize rallies and campaign events. Leading members of the "No" campaign, which included many high-profile former members of the MHP such as Meral Akşener, Ümit Özdağ, Sinan Oğan, and Yusuf Halaçoğlu, were all subject to violence and campaign restrictions. The "Yes" campaign was faced with campaigning restrictions by several European countries, with the German, Dutch, Danish and Swiss governments all cancelling or requesting the suspension of "Yes" campaign events directed at Turkish voters living abroad. The restrictions caused a sharp deterioration in diplomatic relations and caused a diplomatic crisis between Turkey and the Netherlands. Concerns were also raised about voting irregularities, with "Yes" voters in Germany being caught attempting to vote more than once and also being found to have been in possession of ballot papers before the overseas voting process had started. European election monitors said the vote did not meet international standards.

== Background ==
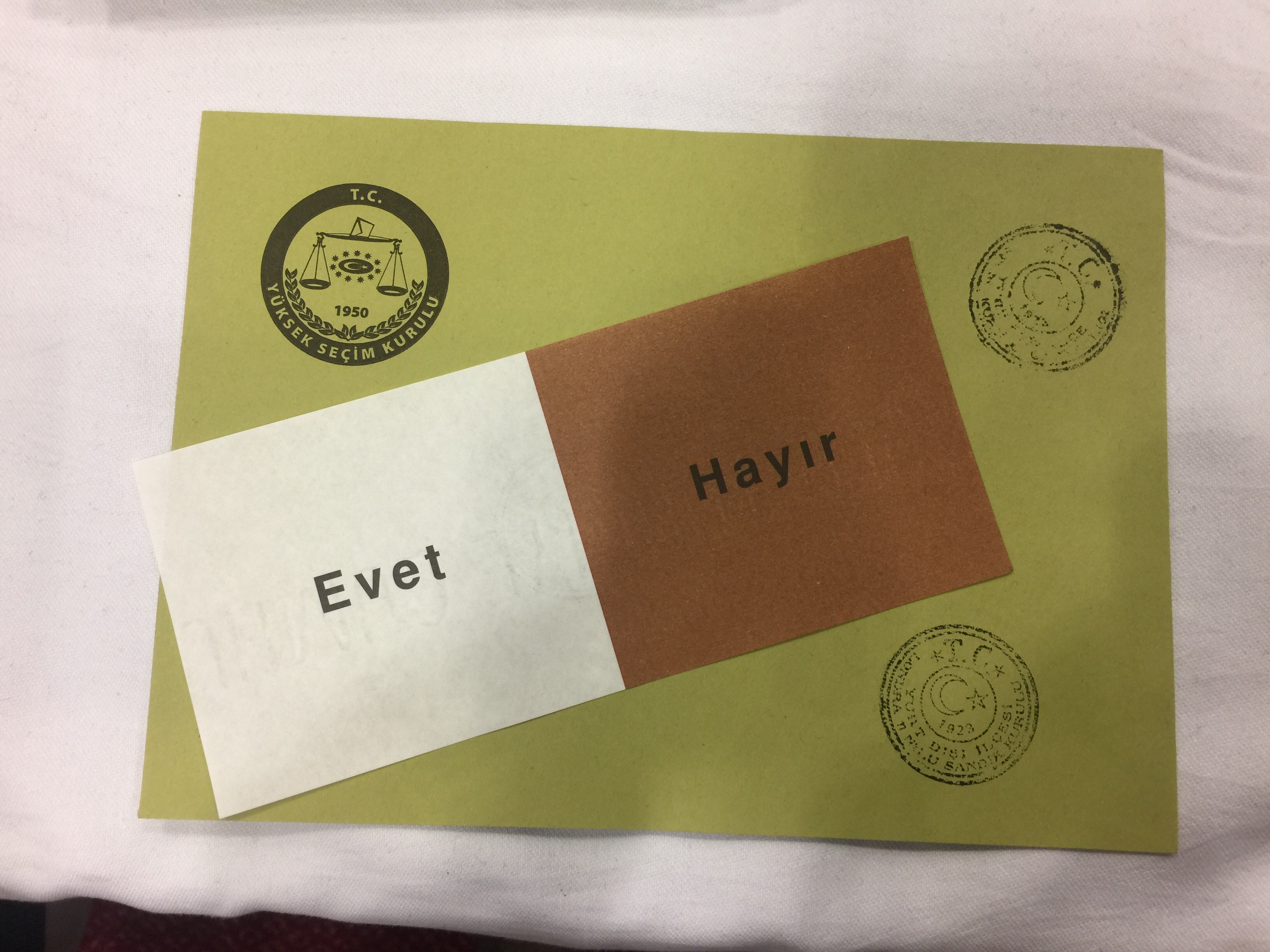
A ballot paper and envelope used in the referendum. 'Evet' translates to Yes while 'Hayır' translates to No.

Introducing a presidential system was proposed by then-Minister of Justice Cemil Çiçek and backed by then-Prime Minister Erdoğan in 2005. Since then, the current presidential system has been openly supported by Justice and Development Party leaders several times, along with a "new constitution". Justice and Development Party vice-president Hayati Yazıcı proposed April 2017 as a date for the referendum.

The parliamentary system formally began transforming into a centralised presidential system after President Recep Tayyip Erdoğan won the July 2018 elections. Since its inception, there have been competing arguments for and against this transformation.

== Constitutional amendments ==
=== Initial proposals ===
On 10 December 2016, the AKP and MHP brought forward a total of 21 proposed amendments to the constitution and began collecting signatures from MPs in order to begin the parliamentary procedures for initiating a referendum. After Assembly Commission talks, 3 proposals were withdrawn, leaving 18 amendments remaining. The full-text proposal in Turkish and the present Turkish constitution are found at the following links. The most important changes have been highlighted by the Union of Turkish Bar Associations.

An English-language summary and interpretation of the 18 amendments is listed in the table below.

Description of proposed amendments
Proposal #	Article	Description of change
1	Article 9	The judiciary is required to act on condition of impartiality.
2	Article 75	The number of seats in the Parliament is raised from 550 to 600.
3	Article 76	The age requirement to stand as a candidate in an election is lowered from 25 to 18, while the condition of having to complete compulsory military service is removed. Individuals with relations to the military are ineligible to run for election.
4	Article 77	Parliamentary terms are extended from four to five years. Parliamentary and presidential elections will be held on the same day every five years.
5	Article 87	The functions of Parliament are: Making, changing, removing laws.; Accepting international contracts.; Discuss, increase or decrease budget (in the Budget Commission) and accept or reject the budget in the General Assembly.; Appoint 7 members of HSYK; And using other powers written in the constitution
6	Article 89	To overcome a presidential veto, the Parliament needs to adopt the same bill with an absolute majority (301).
7	Article 98	Parliament now detects cabinet and Vice President with Parliamentary Research, Parliamentary Investigation, General Discussion and Written Question. Interpellation is abolished and replaced with Parliamentary Investigation. Vice President needs to answer Written Questions within 15 days.
8	Article 101	In order to stand as a presidential candidate, an individual requires the endorsement of one or more parties that won 5% or more in the preceding parliamentary elections and 100,000 voters. The elected president no longer needs to terminate their party membership if they have one.
9	Article 104	The President becomes both the head of state and head of government, with the power to appoint and sack ministers and Vice President. The president can issue executive decrees. If the Parliament makes a law about a topic where the President has issued an executive order, parliamentary law overrides the decree.
10	Article 105	Parliament can open parliamentary investigation with an absolute majority (301). Parliament discusses proposal in 1 month. Following the completion of Discussion, Parliamentary investigation can begin in Parliament with a secret three-fifths (360) vote in favor. Following the completion of investigations, the parliament can vote to indict the President with a secret two-thirds (400) vote in favor.
11	Article 106	The President can appoint one or more Vice Presidents. If the Presidency falls vacant, then fresh presidential elections must be held within 45 days. If parliamentary elections are due within less than a year, then they too are held on the same day as early presidential elections. If the parliament has over a year left before its term expires, then the newly elected president serves until the end of the parliamentary term, after which both presidential and parliamentary elections are held. This does not count towards the President's two-term limit. Parliamentary investigations into possible crimes committed by Vice Presidents and ministers can begin in Parliament with a three-fifths vote in favor. Following the completion of investigations, the parliament can vote to indict Vice Presidents or ministers with a two-thirds vote in favor. If found guilty, the Vice President or minister in question is only removed from office if their crime is one that bars them from running for election. If a sitting MP is appointed as a minister or Vice President, their parliamentary membership will be terminated.
12	Article 116	The President and three-fifths of the Parliament can decide to hold snap elections. In this case, the enactor also dissolves itself until elections.
13	Article 119	The President's ability to declare a state of emergency is now subject to parliamentary approval before it can take effect. The Parliament can extend, remove or shorten it. A state of emergency can be extended for up to four months at a time, except during war where there is no limitation. Every presidential decree issued during a state of emergency will need approval from Parliament.
14	Article 125	The acts of the President are now subject to judicial review.
15	Article 142	Military courts are abolished unless they are erected to investigate actions of soldiers under conditions of war.
16	Article 146	The President used to appoint one Justice from High Military Court of Appeals, and one from the High Military Administrative Court. As military courts would be abolished, the number of Justices in the Constitutional Court would be reduced from 17 to 15. Consequently, presidential appointees would be reduced from 14 to 12, while the Parliament would continue to appoint three.
17	Article 159	Supreme Board of Judges and Prosecutors is renamed to "Board of Judges and Prosecutors", members are reduced from 22 to 13, departments are reduced from 3 to 2. 4 members are appointed by President, 7 will be appointed by the Grand Assembly. Supreme Board of Judges and Prosecutors (HSYK) candidates will need to get 2/3 (400) votes to pass first round and will need 3/5 (360) votes in second round to be a member of HSYK. (The Justice Minister and Ministry of Justice Undersecretary are ex officio members, which is unchanged).
18	Article 161	The President proposes fiscal budget to the Grand Assembly 75 days prior to the fiscal new year. Budget Commission members can make changes to the budget but Parliamentary members cannot make proposals to change public expenditures. If the budget is not approved, then a temporary budget will be proposed. If the temporary budget is also not approved, the previous year's budget would be used with the previous year's increment ratio. (Note: This increment ratio is defined by Ministry of Finance and determines changes on absolute-valued taxes and fines.)
19	Several articles	Adaptation of several articles of the constitution with other changes, mainly transferring executive powers of cabinet to the President
20	Temporary Article 21	The next presidential and next general elections will be held on 3 November 2019. If the Grand Assembly decides early elections, both will be held on the same day. Board of Judges and Prosecutors elections will be held within 30 days of approval of this law. Military courts will be abolished once the law comes into force.
21	Applicability of amendments 1-17	The amendments (2, 4, and 7) will come into force after new elections, other amendments (except temporary article) will come into force once a newly elected president is sworn in. Annuls the article which required elected Presidents to forfeit membership in a political party. This constitutional amendment will be voted in a referendum as a whole.

=== Parliamentary Constitutional Commission ===
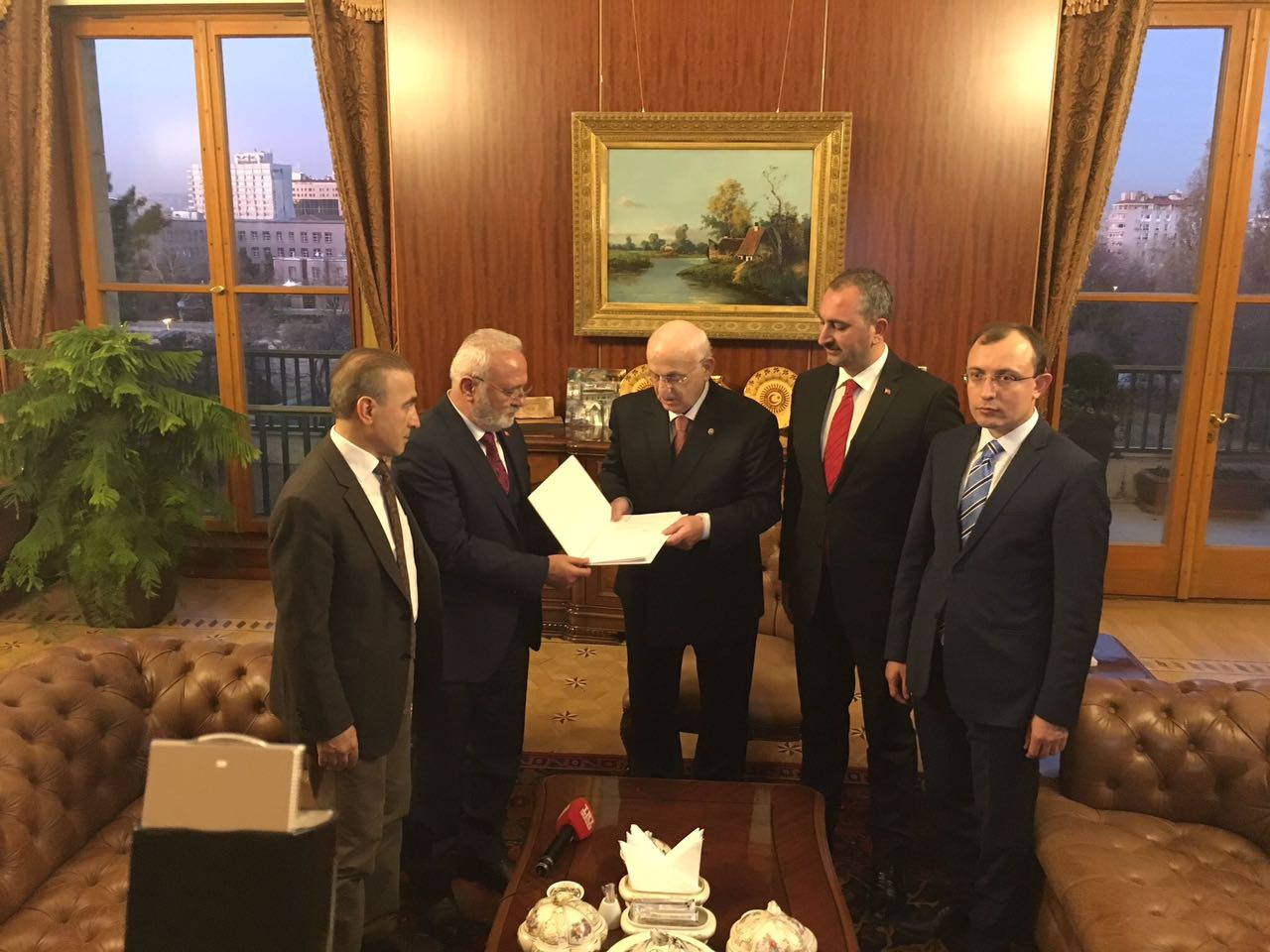
The AKP presenting their constitutional proposals to Parliament Speaker İsmail Kahraman, December 2016

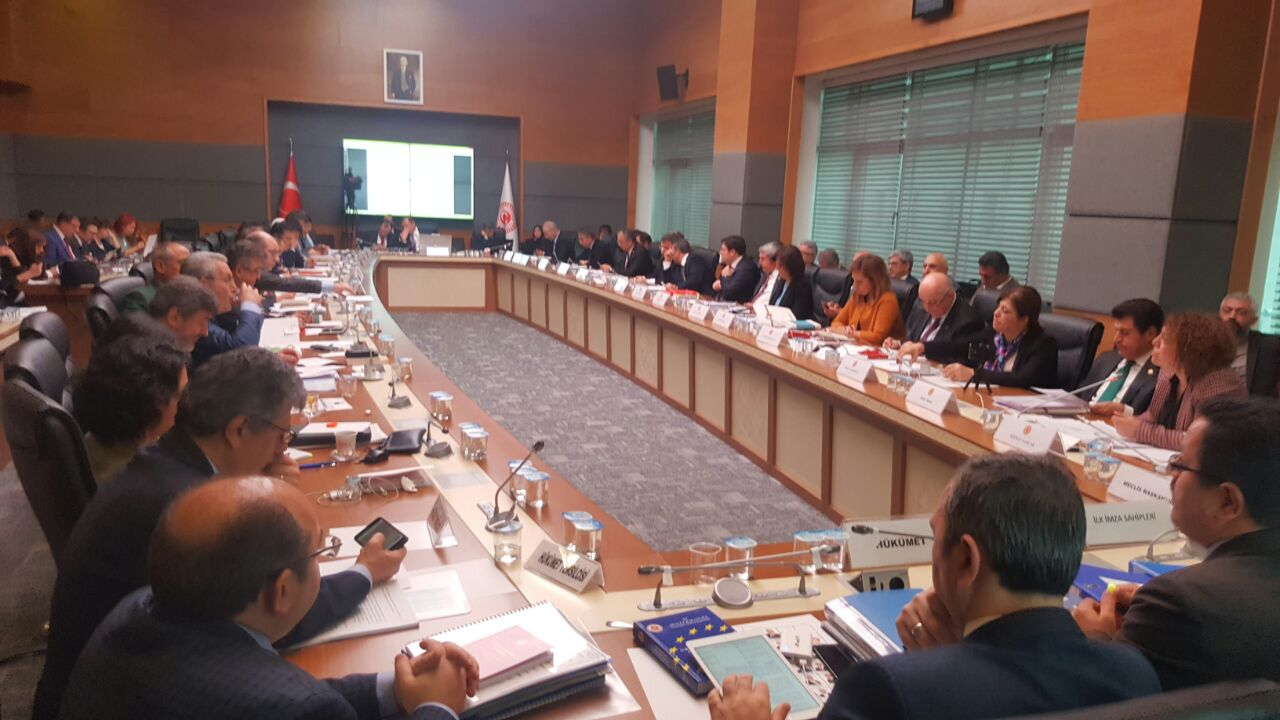
The Parliamentary Constitutional Commission scrutinising the proposed changes

After being signed by the AKP's 316 MPs, the 21 proposed changes were submitted to the Speaker of the Grand National Assembly and were then referred to the Parliamentary Constitutional Commission. The Parliamentary Constitutional Commission, headed by AKP MP Mustafa Şentop, began scrutinizing the proposals in December 2016, earlier than the planned date of January 2017. The Constitutional Commission is formed of 25 Members of which 15 are from the AKP, 5 are from the CHP, 3 are from the HDP and 2 are from the MHP, as per the composition of parliament. Since the AKP held a large majority of the commission's seats, it was expected by media commentators that there would be minimal surprise developments at the scrutiny stage. Debates in the commission were heated, with occasional fights being observed between MPs.

The Constitutional Commission has the power to amend or reject the proposed changes before they are put to a vote for all MPs. The Commission made minor changes to numerous proposals, such as raising the number of members of the Supreme Board of Judges and Prosecutors from 12 to 13. The commission rejected three of the 21 proposed changes, reducing the constitutional package from 21 proposals to 18. The 5th proposal, which created 'reserve MPs' to take the parliamentary seats that fall vacant between elections, was controversially rejected with just three signatures, well short of the support of 25 commission members or 184 total MPs necessary. It was reported that AKP MPs opposed the creation of 'reserve MPs' on the grounds that it threatened the security of sitting MPs by incentivizing reserves to incapacitate them in order to take their seat. The 15th proposal, giving the President the right to structure the civil service and state institutions through executive decrees, was rejected. A day later on 29 December, the 14th proposal, which gave the right for the President to appoint senior bureaucratic officials, was also rejected.

The Commission completed the approval process on 30 December, rejecting 3 of the 21 proposals in total.

Parliamentary Constitutional Commission scrutiny process results
Proposal	1	2	3	4	5	6	7	8	9	10	11	12	13	14	15	16	17	18	19	20	21
Result	check	check	check	check	X mark	check	check	check	check	check	check	check	check	X mark	X mark	check	check	check	check	check	check

=== Parliamentary voting ===
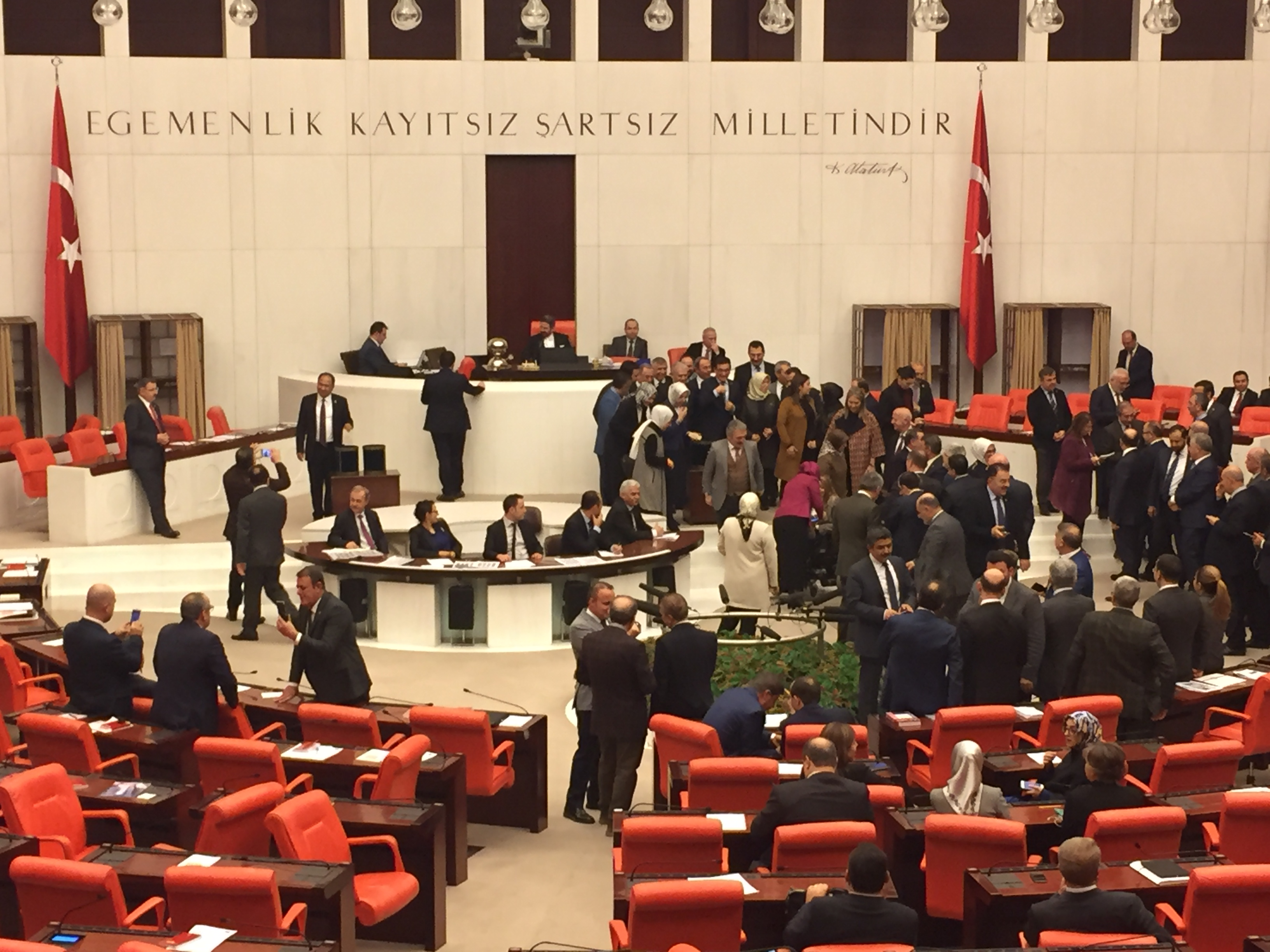
MPs voting on the proposed amendments, January 2017

Following the completion of the Constitutional Commission hearings, the 18 proposals were presented to parliament for ratification. Constitutional amendments need a three fifths majority (330 votes) to be put forward to a referendum and a two-thirds majority (367 votes) to be ratified directly. Justice and Development Party (AK Party) officials claimed before the vote that even if the 367-threshold was reached, the government would not ratify the changes without a referendum.

Parliament voted on each of the 18 proposals separately in two rounds. The first round served as an indicator of whether the amendments would gather sufficient support, with amendments being proposed by all parties present in the chamber. In the second round, parties are no longer permitted to propose changes to the proposals. The results of the second round are taken into account, with 330 votes needed to send them to a referendum or 367 for direct implementation. A final vote on all of the approved proposals at large, with the same thresholds, was undertaken at the end of the second round, with the entire process being disbanded if votes in favour fell below 330.

Of the total 550 Members of Parliament, 537 were entitled to a vote. 11 MPs from the Peoples' Democratic Party (HDP) were under arrest for terrorism charges and were unable to partake in the vote, with the remaining 48 HDP MPs boycotting the vote after their motion calling for the arrested MPs to be brought to parliament to vote was rejected. The Parliamentary Speaker İsmail Kahraman, who is unable to take part in the vote by virtue of being the Speaker, was hospitalized during the vote, meaning that AK Party deputy speaker Ahmet Aydın presided over the proceedings and was therefore unable to cast a vote.

Of the 537 MPs eligible to vote, the AK Party held 315, the CHP 133, the MHP 39, the HDP 48 and 2 were independent. Out of the MHP's 39 MPs, 6 had openly stated that they would vote against the amendments, leaving the total number of MPs expected to vote "Yes" at 348. The CHP's 133 MPs and the two independents, which consisted of Aylin Nazlıaka and Ümit Özdağ, voted "No" while the HDP boycotted the votes.

Theoretical distribution of votes according to party lines
Party		Leader	Party position	Total MPs	Eligible to vote	Voting yes	Voting no	Graphical representation
AK Party	Justice and Development Party	Binali Yıldırım	Yes	317	315	315	0	
CHP	Republican People's Party	Kemal Kılıçdaroğlu	No	133	133	0	133	
MHP	Nationalist Movement Party	Devlet Bahçeli	Yes	39	39	33	6	
HDP	Peoples' Democratic Party	Selahattin Demirtaş / Serpil Kemalbay	No	59	48	Boycotting		
	Independents		No (both)	2	2	0	2	MPs ordered by party line. Black denotes MPs ineligible to vote
Total				550	537	348	141	Referendum

Parliamentary voting began on 9 January, with the first round of voting being completed on 15 January. Opposition politicians criticized the rushed way in which the votes were conducted, with four to five votes taking place in a day with no adjournments. The votes were marred by numerous irregularities, with CHP Members of Parliament filming AK Party MPs openly casting their vote or intimidating uncertain MPs to vote "Yes". The Minister of Health, Recep Akdağ, was filmed casting an open vote, which is disallowed by the constitution, and openly admitting that he had committed a crime afterwards. AKP MPs responded to attempts to film them with hostility, with fights occasionally breaking out between government and opposition MPs. CHP MP Fatma Kaplan Hürriyet was allegedly strangled by AKP Parliamentary Group Leader Mustafa Elitaş after she filmed Elitaş and Prime Minister Binali Yıldırım casting open votes. Several MPs were hospitalized, while the podium where MPs rose to make speeches was dislocated with one of its €15,000 microphones being reported as missing. The second round of voting was completed on 20 January, with all of the proposed amendments being approved. A final motion to enact the approved amendments was approved by 339 votes, surpassing the 330-vote threshold to hold a referendum but falling short of the 367-vote threshold needed to enact the amendments directly.

=== Article voting ===
Proposal	Issue	First round				Second round				Results
Proposal	Issue	MP turnout	Yes	No	Other	MP turnout	Yes	No	Other	Results
Proposal	Motion to begin the voting process	480	338	134	3	MP turnout	Yes	No	Other	Results
1	Neutrality of the judiciary	484	347	132	5	486	345	140	1	check
2	Increasing the number of MPs to 600 from 550	480	343	133	3	485	342	139	4	check
3	Eligibility for parliamentary candidacy	485	341	139	5	486	342	137	6	check
4	Elections every five years for both Parliament and Presidency	486	343	139	4	486	342	138	6	check
5	Powers and responsibilities of Parliament	354	343	7	4	486	342	140	4	check
6	Audit authorities of Parliament	483	343	137	3	485	342	138	5	check
7	Election of the President	482	340	136	6	484	340	136	8	check
8	Duties of the President	481	340	135	6	483	339	138	6	check
9	Penal responsibility of the President	485	343	137	5	483	341	137	5	check
10	Vice-presidency and ministries	483	343	135	5	481	340	136	5	check
11	Renewal of elections	483	341	134	8	481	342	135	4	check
12	State of Emergency	482	344	133	5	484	342	138	4	check
13	Abolition of military courts	482	343	133	6	484	343	136	5	check
14	High council of judges and prosecutors	483	341	133	9	487	342	139	6	check
15	Budget regulation	483	341	134	8	486	342	141	3	check
16	Adaptation of other articles	482	341	134	7	486	342	141	3	check
17	Temporary article for transition to new system	484	342	135	7	485	341	139	5	check
18	President can be party member & when changes would be effective	481	344	131	6	488	343	142	3	check
Motion to enact the approved changes (330 for referendum, 367 for direct implementation)						488	339	142	7	check

Several AKP MPs voted openly for the changes, violating the constitutional requirement of a secret vote.

== Reception ==
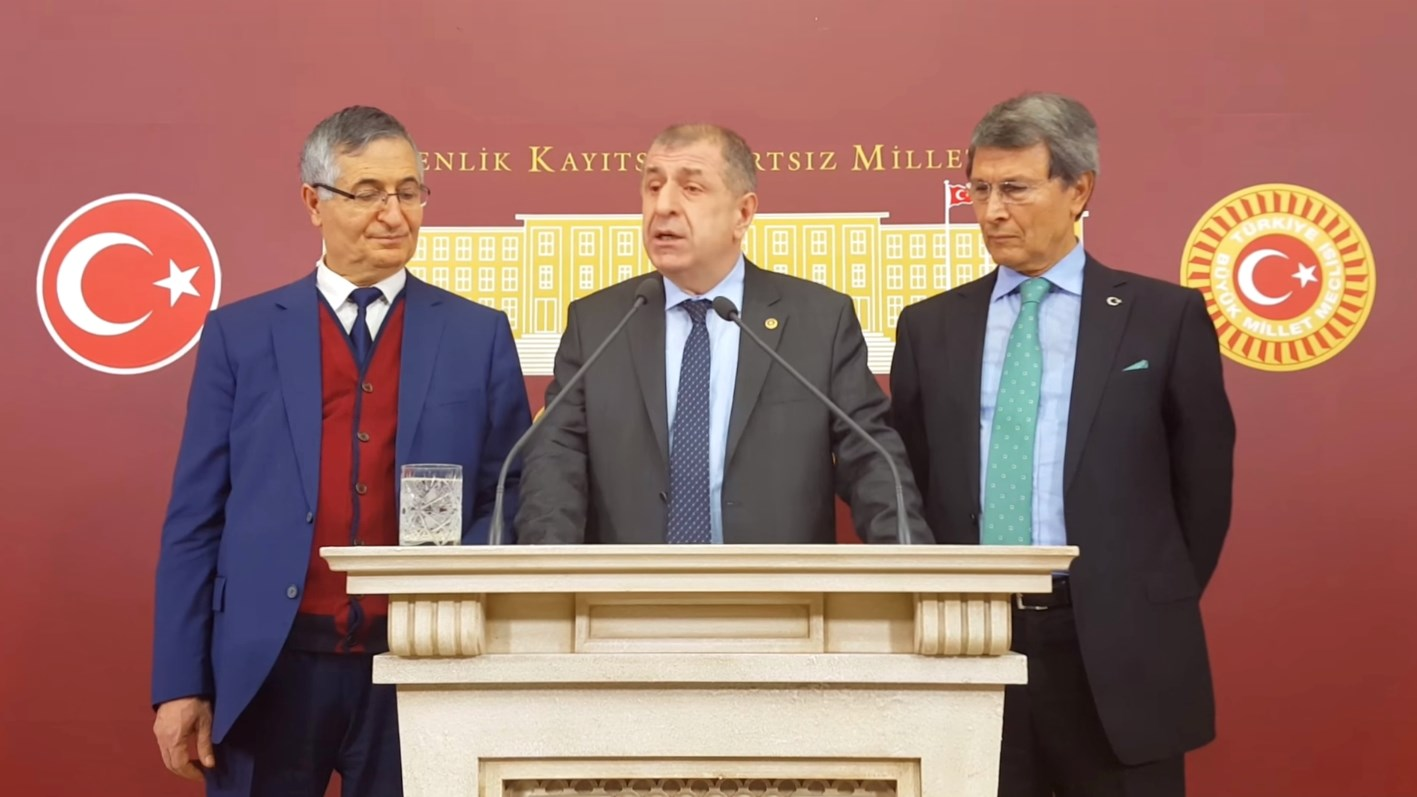
MHP MPs Özcan Yeniçeri, Ümit Özdağ and Yusuf Halaçoğlu announcing their opposition to the proposed constitutional changes

The amendments were received with heavy criticism from opposition parties and non-governmental organisations, with criticism focusing particularly on the erosion of the separation of powers and the abolition of parliamentary accountability. Constitutional legal experts such as Kemal Gözler and İbrahim Kaboğlu claimed that the changes would result in the Parliament becoming effectively powerless, while the executive president would have controls over the executive, legislative, and judiciary. On 4 December, the Atatürkist Thought Association (ADD), Association for the Support of Contemporary Living (ÇYDD) and the Trade Union Confederation held a rally in Ankara despite having their permissions revoked by the Governor of Ankara, calling for a rejection of the executive presidential system on the grounds that it threatened judicial independence and secular democratic values.

The amendments were initially received with mixed responses from the opposition CHP, which have long been critical of the AKP's constitutional plans. Shortly after the proposals were made public and submitted to Parliament on 10 December, Prime Minister Binali Yıldırım reported that the CHP was in agreement with 5 of the proposed changes. However, reception by the CHP was negative, with the party's deputy leader Selin Sayek Böke claiming that the proposals essentially created a "sultanate". Parliamentary group leader Levent Gök, one of the first to comment on the released proposals, claimed that the changes would revert 140 years of Turkish parliamentary democracy, calling on all parties to reject the proposals. Another of the CHP's parliamentary group leaders, Özgür Özel, called the proposals a "regime change", with the parliament being left essentially powerless in scrutinising ministers and holding them to account. Özel claimed that the AKP were unlikely to obtain the 330 votes necessary to put the changes to a referendum, stating that he would be surprised if the number of MPs voting in favour reached 275. CHP MP Selina Doğan claimed that the authoritarian nature of the proposals would effectively end Turkey's EU accession negotiations, citing the lack of any relevance to European values. CHP MP Cemal Oktan Yüksel claimed that the proposals resembled the constitution of Assad's Syria, stating that it wouldn't be a national constitution but "Syria's constitution translated".

Despite having the nationalist MHP's official support, it was reported that Turkish nationalists were also overwhelmingly critical of both the proposals and their party's involvement in their drafting. Bahçeli, who has historically lent support to the AKP in controversial situations, was subject to criticism from all major parties for his decision to support the constitutional amendments, being described as the AKP's "back garden", "life-line" or "spare tyre" by critics. On 24 October 2016, 5 of the 40 MHP Members of Parliament declared that they would reject the constitutional proposals, against their party line. Ümit Özdağ, who was a leadership candidate against Bahçeli and one of the 5 MPs critical of the changes, had his party membership revoked in November. A poll released by Gezici in December showed that almost two-thirds of MHP supporters were against the proposed changes, though MHP supporters were also the most undecided amongst the other parties. On 27 December, MHP MP Kadir Koçdemir became the fifth MP from his party to publicly state his opposition to the proposals.

Speaking shortly after the proposals were released, the HDP's spokesperson Ayhan Bilgen criticized the proposed changes for being anti-democratic and against the principle of judicial independence. Citing the proposed creation of "executive orders" that can be decreed by the President at will without parliamentary scrutiny. Bilgen criticized the nature of the changes, calling them poorly written and an attempt to cover up constitutional violations that had taken place under the current constitution. However, on 18 December, HDP MP Kadri Yıldırım claimed that there would be no reason to reject the proposals if the changes included a separate "status" for Turkish Kurds and a constitutional entitlement to education for Kurdish citizens in their native Kurdish language. This led to speculation that the HDP could be convinced to support the changes by the AKP government, though the MHP would be unlikely to jointly support any changes that were also endorsed by the HDP. On 21 December, the CHP and HDP issued a parliamentary motion that would declare the proposals "unconstitutional", but the motion was rejected by MPs.

The changes have also received severe criticism from outside Turkey. One commentator went so far as to declare that "if a majority votes yes, this will be the end of parliamentary democracy in Turkey." The NGO Human Rights Watch stated that the changes were a "huge threat to human rights, the rule of law, and the country's democratic future." The Economist concluded that "a vote for Yes would saddle the country with an elected dictator." The Venice Commission of the Council of Europe, in its March 2017 Opinion on the Constitutional amendments, defined them as "a threat to democracy" and stressed the "dangers of degeneration of the proposed system towards and authoritarian and personal regime". Also, before the vote took place, the openDemocracy website reported that some European news outlets published concerns that the 2017 referendum amounted to something like an "enabling act" for Erdoğan.

== Campaign positions ==
Ruling party AK Party and opposition MHP are the signatories of the amendments. MHP has provided their conditional support until their conditions are met. Main opposition CHP's initial position was to wait until the amendments were finalized. CHP leader Kılıçdaroğlu once mentioned of bringing the changes into Grand Assembly. Later, CHP decided to favor No vote and started "Türkiye'yi Böldürmeyeceğiz" (Turkish: We'll not partition Turkey) rallies. Parliament's fourth party HDP is against the changes.

=== Political parties ===
Choice	Party		Leader	Political orientation	Ref.
Parties attended the last general election
Yes	AK Party	Justice and Development Party	Binali Yıldırım	Right-wing	
Yes	MHP	Nationalist Movement Party (party executive)	Devlet Bahçeli	Far-right	
Yes	BBP	Great Union Party (party executive)	Mustafa Destici	Far-right	
No	CHP	Republican People's Party	Kemal Kılıçdaroğlu	Centre-left	
No	MHP	Nationalist Movement Party inner-party factions	Collective leadership	Far-right	
No	HDP	Peoples' Democratic Party	Selahattin Demirtaş & Figen Yüksekdağ	Left-wing	
No	Saadet	Felicity Party	Temel Karamollaoğlu	Right-wing	
No	BBP	Great Union Party inner-party factions	Collective leadership	Far-right	
No	Vatan	Patriotic Party	Doğu Perinçek	Far-left	
No	HAK-PAR	Rights and Freedoms Party	Refik Karakoç	Left-wing	
No	HKP	People's Liberation Party	Nurullah Ankut	Far-left	
No	DP	Democrat Party	Gültekin Uysal	Centre-right	
No	KP	Communist Party	Arif Hikmet Basa	Far-left	
No	DSP	Democratic Left Party	Önder Aksakal	Centre-left	
No	LDP	Liberal Democratic Party	Gültekin Tırpancı	Centre	
No	MP	Nation Party	Aykut Edibali	Right-wing	
No	DYP	True Path Party	Çetin Özaçıkgöz	Centre-right	
No	BTP	Independent Turkey Party	Haydar Baş	Centre	

Other parties
Choice	Party		Leader	Political orientation	Ref.
Yes	Yeni Dünya	New World Party	Emanullah Gündüz	Right-wing	
Yes	HÜDA PAR	Free Cause Party	Zekeriya Yapıcıoğlu	Far-right	
Conditional yes
Conditional yes	Osmanlı	Ottoman Party	İbrahim Ünye	Far-right	
No
No	TSİP	Socialist Workers' Party of Turkey	Turgut Koçak	Far-left	
No	TKP	Communist Party of Turkey	Hüseyin Karabulut	Far-left	
No	ÖDP	Freedom and Solidarity Party	Collective leadership	Left-wing	
No	EMEP	Labour Party	Selma Gürkan	Far-left	
No	DSİP	Revolutionary Socialist Workers' Party	Meltem Oral & Şenol Karakaş	Left-wing	
No	YP	Homeland Party	Sadettin Tantan	Right-wing	
No	AYP	Crescent Star Party	Serap Gülhan	Centre	
No	EHP	Labourist Movement Party	Sibel Uzun	Left-wing	
No	İKP	Workers' Fraternity Party	Mehmet Şadi Ozansü	Left-wing	
No	DİP	Revolutionist Workers' Party	Ömer Sungur Savran	Far-left	
No	DBP	Democratic Regions Party	Emine Ayna	Centre-left	
No	HEPAR	Rights and Equality Party	Yücel Savaş	Third Position	
No	ESP	Socialist Party of the Oppressed	Sultan Ulusoy	Far-left	
No	TİKP	Workers Villagers Party of Turkey	İsmail Durna	Left-wing	
No	ANAP	Motherland Party	İbrahim Çelebi	Centre-right	
No	Dev-Parti	Revolutionary People's Party	Celal Özcan	Left-wing	
No	MTP	Nationalist Turkey Party	Ahmet Yılmaz Büyükekmekci	Centre	
No	ÖSP	Freedom and Socialism Party	Sinan Çiftyürek	Far-left	
No	1920 TKP	Socialist Liberation Party	Şener Ataş	Far-left	
No	Yeşil Sol	Greens and the Left Party of the Future	Naci Sönmez	Left-wing	
No	TİVEP	Unemployed's and Labourers' Party of Turkey	Rıfat Derya Sercan	Centre-left	
No	SYKP	Socialist Refoundation Party	Tülay Hatimoğlulları Oruç	Far-left	
No	KP	Women's Party	Benal Yazgan	Feminism	
No	TURAN	Great Turan Movement Party	Varol Esen	Far-right	
No	HHP	Rights and Peace Party	Gürsel Yıldız	Centre	
No	HTKP	People's Communist Party of Turkey	Emre Yağan	Far-left	
No	CİHAP	Universe Party	Kürşad Emre Öğretmek	Centre	
No	Anayol	Main Path Party	Zafer Maden	Centre-right	
No	TÜHAP	People's Party of Turkey	Mehmet Çetin	Centre	
No	MMP	National Struggle Party	Ahmet Kaya	Right-wing	
No	ASP	AS Party	Cavit Kayıkcı	Right-wing	
No	İDP	Workers' Democracy Party	Oktay Çelik	Left-wing	
No	TKH	Communist Movement of Turkey	Erkan Pınarbaşı	Far-left	
No	Devrimci	United Revolutionist Party	Ufuk Göllü	Left-wing	
No	AP	Justice Party	Vecdet Öz	Centre-right	
No	TBP	Unity Party of Turkey	Hüseyin Ekici	Kemalism	
No	SEP	Socialist Laborers' Party	Gökçe Şentürk	Left-wing	
No	EYP	Universal Path Party	Metin Güler	Alevism	
No	Büyük	Great Turkey Party	Tevfik Diker	Centre-right	
No	DGP	Democratic Young Party	Erkin Çözeli	Centre	
No	Ulusal Parti	National Party	Gökçe Fırat Çulhaoğlu	Far-left	
Neutral	Hak Parti	Rights and Truth Party	Dursun Güneş & Serkan Aslan	Islamism	
Boycott	PAK	Free Kurdistan Party	Mustafa Özçelik	Kurdish independence	
Boycott	PSK	Kurdistan Socialist Party	Mesut Tek	Kurdish independence	

=== NGOs and other groups ===
NGOs and other groups
Choice	NGO	Type	Political orientation	Ref.
Yes	Ottoman (Osmanoğlu) family	Former Ottoman dynasty	-	
Yes	Independent Industrialists and Businessmen Association (MÜSİAD)	Business organization	Right-wing	
Yes	Ottoman Hearths	Organisation	Right-wing	
Yes	Confederation of Public Servants Trade Unions (Memur-Sen)	Trade union	Centre-right	
No	Union of Chambers of Turkish Engineers and Architects (TMMOB)	Trade union	Centre-left	
No	Turkish Medical Association (TTB)	Medical union	Centre-left	
No	MHP Dissidents	Intra-party opposition	Far-right	
No	BBP Dissidents	Intra-party opposition	Far-right	
No	Confederation of Public Workers' Unions of Turkey (Türkiye Kamu-Sen)	Trade union	Centre-right	
No	Confederation of Public Workers' Unions (KESK)	Trade union	Left-wing	
No	Confederation of Progressive Trade Unions of Turkey (DİSK)	Trade union	Left-wing	
No	United Confederation of Public Employees' Unions (Birleşik Kamu-İş)	Trade union	Kemalism	
No	Atatürkist Thought Association (ADD)		Kemalism	
No	Youth Union of Turkey (TGB)	Youth organisation	Far-left	
No	Republican Women's Association (CKD)	Women organization	Far-left	
No	Retired Military Officers Association of Turkey (TESUD)	Military veterans organization	Kemalism	
No	Artists' Union of Turkey (TSB)	Art organization	Far-left	
No	Artists' Initiative	Art organization	Left-wing	
No	Turkish Law Institution	Institution	Kemalism	
No	National Constitution Movement	Think tank	Kemalism	
No	Intellectuals' Hearth		Nationalism	
No	Confederation of Turkish Tribes (TÜRKBOY)		Nationalism	
No	Social Thought Association (TDD)		Nationalism	
No	Turkish Left	Magazine	Third Position	
Neutral	Confederation of Turkish Real Trade Unions (HAK-İŞ)	Trade union	Right-wing	

== Campaigns ==
=== "Yes" campaign ===
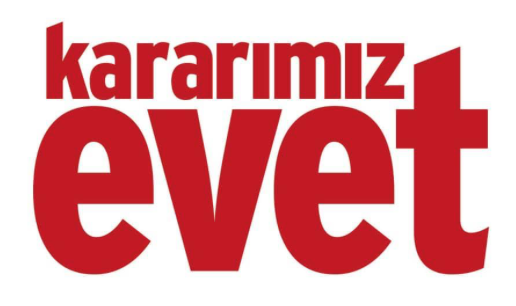
The AK Party "Yes" campaign logo. Kararımız evet translates to 'Our decision is yes'

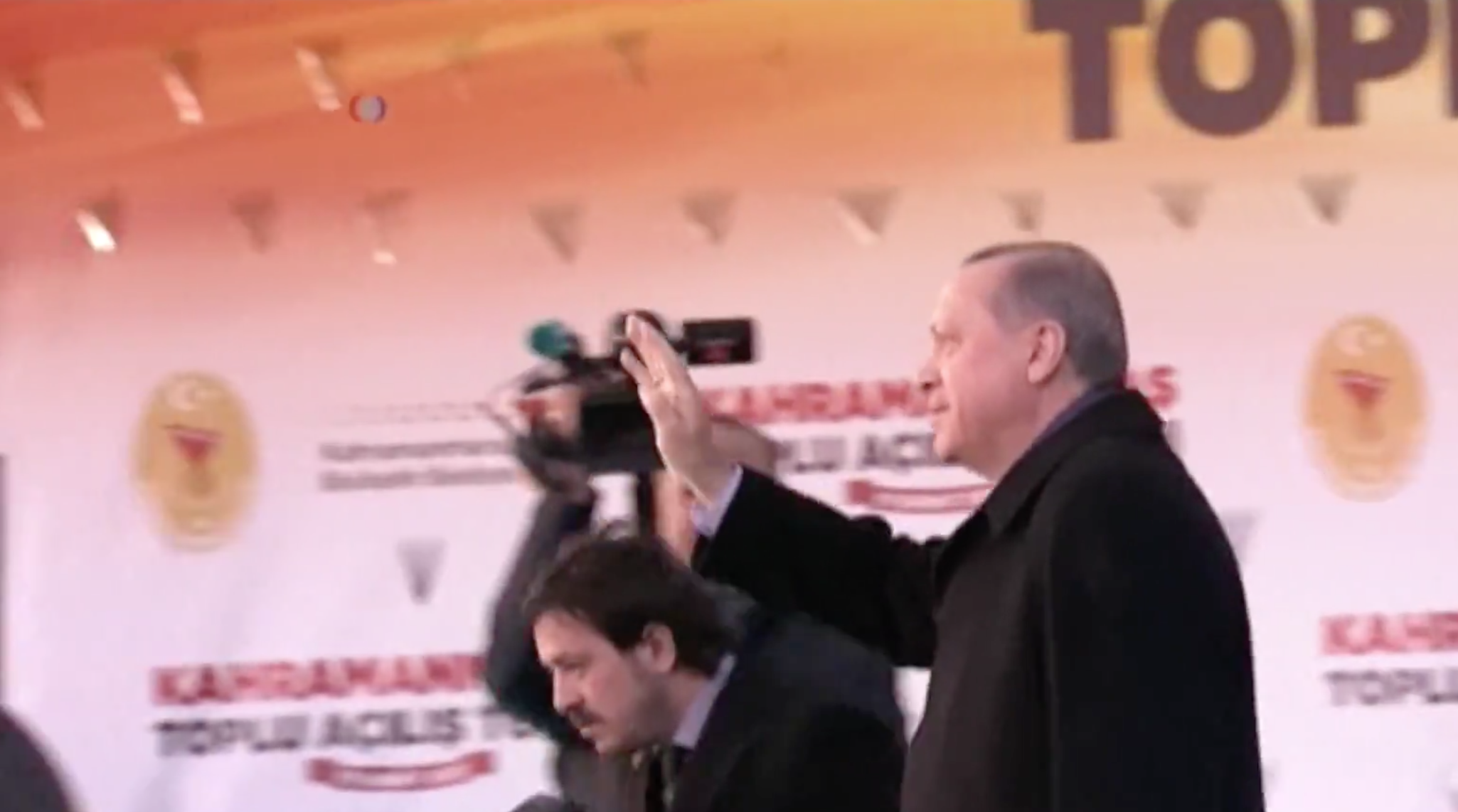
Recep Tayyip Erdoğan campaigning for a "Yes" vote in Kahramanmaraş, 17 February 2017

The "Yes" campaign has been predominantly led by Justice and Development Party (AK Party) politicians, as well as Nationalist Movement Party (MHP) politicians loyal to leader Devlet Bahçeli. Initially expecting a 7 February start to the campaign, the AKP eventually kicked off their official campaign on 25 February with a presentation by Prime Minister Binali Yıldırım at the Ankara sports stadium. Amid poor showings in opinion polls in February, Erdoğan reportedly asked pro-government pollsters to suspend their opinion polling until the end of March, while proposals for a joint electoral rally by both leading AK Party and MHP politicians has also been proposed.

The "Yes" campaign has been criticized for its smear campaign against individuals voting "No", associating them with numerous terrorist organisations. Prime Minister Binali Yıldırım claimed that they would vote "Yes" because the Kurdistan Workers Party (PKK) and the so-called Fethullah Gülen Terrorist Organisation (FETO) were voting "No", though both organisations have historically been in favour of an executive presidency. President Recep Tayyip Erdoğan also caused controversy when he claimed that those voting "No" were siding with the coup plotters behind the 2016 Turkish coup d'état attempt.

At present, the "Yes" campaign has been conducted through electoral rallies held by Prime Minister Yıldırım, leading AK Party politicians and also President Erdoğan, who has held 'public opening' rallies similar to his tactics in the June 2015 general election. MHP leader Devlet Bahçeli has conducted conferences in favour of a "Yes" vote, with the first occurring in Konya on 12 February 2017.

On 10 March, the Great Union Party (BBP) led by Mustafa Destici announced that they would support a "Yes" vote, bringing the total number of parties supporting "Yes" to six. Both the BBP and MHP have suffered serious opposition to their support for a "Yes" vote, with BBP members calling for Destici's resignation following his announcement. The MHP suffered a wave of resignations, inner-party suspensions and a rival "No" campaign run by high-profile nationalist politicians, with opinion polls indicating that a significant majority of MHP voters intend to vote against the proposals. Most polls put the percentage of "No" voters in the MHP at between 50% and 80%, with definite "Yes" voters remaining at 20-25%. Politicians supporting "No" from both the MHP and BBP have claimed that over 95% of their party supporters are favouring a "No" vote, breaking with their party's executive decision.

Key parties campaigning for a "Yes" vote
Party		Leader	Details
AK Party	Justice and Development Party	Binali Yıldırım	View campaign
MHP	Nationalist Movement Party (party executive)	Devlet Bahçeli	View campaign

=== "No" campaign ===
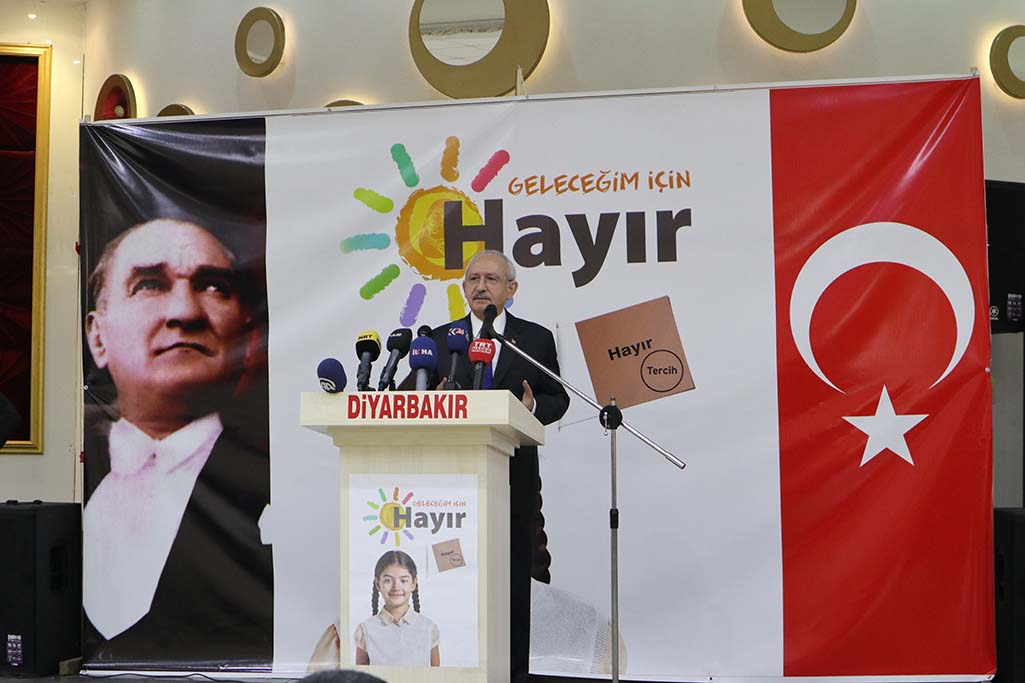
CHP leader Kemal Kılıçdaroğlu addressing a "No" rally in Diyarbakır

The CHP unveiled their campaign logo and slogan on 28 February, using the slogan 'Geleceğim için Hayır' (translating to For my future, no). The party planned their first electoral rally in Amasya, though preliminary rallies were held by party leader Kemal Kılıçdaroğlu on 21 December 2016 in Adana and by dissident MP Muharrem İnce on 8 March 2017 at Zonguldak. CHP MPs also made a series of overseas visits to rally support from overseas voters, with former leader Deniz Baykal holding an event in France.

High-profile dissident MHP politicians, such as Meral Akşener, Sinan Oğan, Ümit Özdağ, and Yusuf Halaçoğlu all began a "No" campaign based on Turkish nationalism, rivalling the MHP's official "Yes" campaign. The dissident "No" campaign attracted significantly higher popularity than the MHP's official "Yes" events, with opinion polls indicating that an overwhelming majority of MHP voters intend to break the party line and vote "No". In addition to the MHP dissidents, the Turkish Bars Association and its President Metin Feyzioğlu and Leader of "No" Party Leader Tuna Bekleviç embarked on a nationwide tour, intending to meet with locals in numerous towns and villages to rally support for a "No" vote.

"No" campaigners have faced alleged government-backed coercion and suppression. On 1 March, the main opposition Republican People's Party (CHP) unveiled a 78-point report regarding irregularities and suppression of "No" campaigners, with Deputy Leader Öztürk Yılmaz claiming that those who were campaigning for a "No" vote faced fear and state coercion. CHP parliamentary group leader Engin Altay also criticized the government for using state funds to fund the "Yes" campaign while repressing "No" voters, claiming that their conduct did not allow them to talk of 'democracy'.

Key parties campaigning for a "No" vote
Party		Leader	Details
CHP	Republican People's Party	Kemal Kılıçdaroğlu	View campaign
MHP	Nationalist Movement Party (opposition within the party)	Collective leadership	View campaign
HDP	Peoples' Democratic Party	Selahattin Demirtaş	View campaign

== Controversies and electoral misconduct ==
Allegations of electoral misconduct, irregularities throughout the campaign and state coercion of "No" supporters were widespread prior to, during and after the referendum. European election monitors said the referendum did not meet international standards.

=== State suppression of "No" voters ===
The AKP government and the General Directorate of Security (police) have both been criticized for employing tactics designed to limit the campaigning abilities of "No" supporters, through arrests, control of the media and political suppression. On 23 January 2017, university students campaigning for a "No" vote on a commuter ferry in Istanbul were implicated by security officers for 'insulting the president', with their arrests being stopped by onboard passengers. On 31 January, Republican People's Party council member Sera Kadıgil was arrested and later freed on charges of 'insulting religious values and inciting hatred' for campaigning for a "No" vote on social media. In Bursa, a voter who revealed that he was voting "No" was reported to the police and later arrested. National television channels have been vastly in favour of the "Yes" campaign. One study found that "Yes" supporters received 90% of airtime. A Turkish court banned a pro-Kurdish Peoples' Democratic Party (HDP) song Bejin Na (Say No) which supported the "No" on the grounds that it contravened the constitution and fomented hatred.

Municipalities held by pro-"Yes" parties have also sought to limit the campaign events of "No" voters by denying them rights to hold rallies in public spaces of community halls. Meral Akşener, a leading nationalist politician and one of the most prominent campaigners for a "No" vote, was stopped from holding speeches when her campaign venues in Yalova and Edirne were abruptly shut down shortly before her events, with posters advertising her events in Eskişehir being ripped down. On 11 February while she was making a speech at a hotel hall in Çanakkale, the venue suffered a power cut and was perceived by the pro-opposition media to be a symbol of the oppressive tactics against the "No" campaign. After initially being obstructed by riot police, attendees at the conference used their phone lights to allow the event to continue.

=== Overseas "Yes" campaign bans ===
Overseas election campaigning, even in diplomatic missions, is illegal under Turkish law. Yet, most political parties in Turkey, including CHP and the ruling AKP, have broken the law.

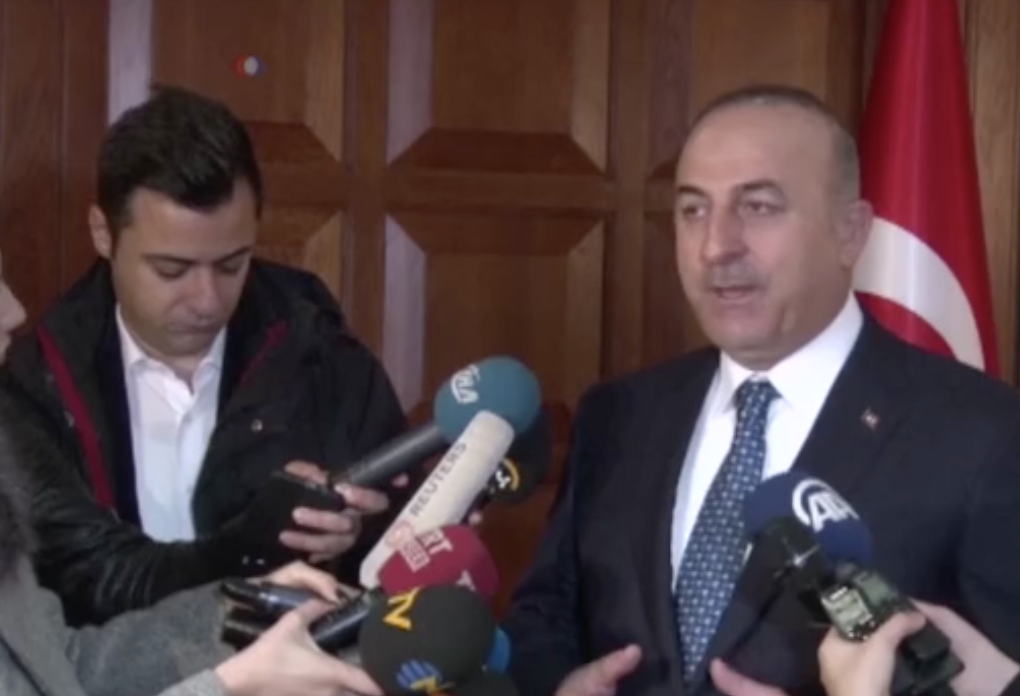
Foreign minister Mevlüt Çavuşoğlu making a statement following the cancellation of campaign events in Germany

In early March, pro-"Yes" campaigners, including high-profile AKP government ministers were barred from holding campaign events in Germany, France, Austria, Sweden, Switzerland, Denmark, and the Netherlands.

==== Germany ====
In Germany, local municipalities withdrew permits for Justice Minister Bekir Bozdağ's campaign event in Gaggenau and Economy Minister Nihat Zeybekçi's event in Cologne. While authorities cited security concerns, the insufficient capacities of the rented venues and irregularities in the organisational process, the Turkish government strongly condemned the cancellations and claimed that they were directly linked to an anti-Turkish agenda of the German federal government. Turkish foreign minister Mevlüt Çavuşoğlu claimed that Germany had shown 'double standards' and a disregard for 'human rights and freedom of speech' by cancelling the events. Following a negative reaction by the German federal government to a proposed rally by Recep Tayyip Erdoğan, Erdoğan accused Germany of 'Nazi-style tactics', causing strong condemnation by German officials and a souring of diplomatic relations. The Turkish government also accused Germany of funding and supporting the Kurdistan Workers Party (PKK), which is designated as a terrorist organisation in both countries. Mevlüt Çavuşoğlu was due to meet his German counterpart on 8 March, with scheduled campaign speeches in Hamburg also being cancelled due to irregularities with the venues. Çavuşoğlu therefore made his speech in the Hamburg consulate, despite Turkish law forbidding election campaigns in diplomatic missions. The cancellations in Germany were met by condemnation from the main opposition and pro-"No" Republican People's Party, with former leader Deniz Baykal cancelling a planned visit to Germany as a result.

==== Diplomatic crisis with the Netherlands ====
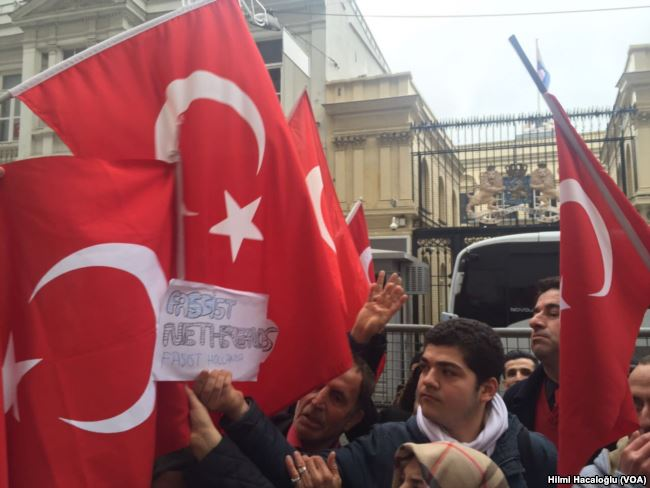
Pro-"Yes" protests outside the Dutch embassy in Turkey following the Dutch–Turkish diplomatic crisis

A diplomatic crisis occurred between Turkey and the Netherlands on 11 March, after Çavuşoğlu's official plane had its permission to land revoked mid-air ahead of a scheduled campaign speech. Later that day, Families and Social Policy Minister Fatma Betül Sayan Kaya's convoy was stopped by Dutch police, which blocked her access to the Turkish consulate in Rotterdam. Kaya was later declared persona non grata, with a regional state of emergency being declared and her convoy being asked to leave the country. Kaya was therefore forced to return to Germany, while Çavuşoğlu left for France to attend another campaign event. Violent protests by Turkish expats broke out in Rotterdam following the expulsion of both ministers, with the police making 12 arrests.

The Dutch government had previously asked Turkish ministers to refrain from campaigning in the country, fearing that divisive campaign rhetoric would sow divisions within the Turkish community. Prime Minister Mark Rutte claimed that negotiations with the Turkish government to allow a small scale speech by the minister were still ongoing, when Çavuşoğlu publicly threatened with sanctions should ministers be prevented from campaigning. It was these threats that made the situation unsolvable to the Dutch government.

Many people in Turkey took the side of the Turkish government in the matter, with the pro-"No" main opposition announcing their support for the government and calling on the AKP to freeze diplomatic relations with the Netherlands. All CHP overseas campaign events were later suspended in solidarity, while the pro-"No" MHP dissident camp also expressed their condemnation against the Dutch government for their actions. In the Dutch parliament all parties, except for the two-seat Denk party, supported the decisions of the Dutch Government. Recep Tayyip Erdoğan reiterated his claim that European governments that suspended campaigning were 'Nazi remnants', which the Dutch government denounced as "unacceptable".

=== Unstamped ballots ===
On the referendum day, while the voting was underway, the Supreme Electoral Council of Turkey lifted a rule that required each ballot to have an official stamp. Instead, it ruled that ballots with no stamp would be considered valid, unless there was proof that they were fraudulent. Some claim that because ballots had not only stamps but other security measures in place, it doesn't make them illegitimate, but no proof whatsoever had been presented for this. The Supreme Electoral Council filed a criminal complaint for the officials that caused the problem by not stamping the ballots. The opposition parties claim that as many as 2.5 million ballots without a stamp were accepted. Opposition parties CHP and HDP have said they will contest the results. CHP leader Kemal Kılıçdaroğlu said that lifting the rule violated Turkish law. According to Meral Akşener, "No" won by 52 percent. The Peoples' Democratic Party contested the election results announced by pro-government Anadolu Agency and insisted that 2.5 million votes without valid stamps should be cancelled.

== Opinion polls ==
=== Nationwide ===
Date(s) conducted	Polling organisation/client	Sample size	Considering undecided vote			Considering only Yes/No vote	
Date(s) conducted	Polling organisation/client	Sample size	Yes	No	Undecided	Yes	No
16 Apr 2017	Nationwide results		51.2	48.8	–	51.2	48.8
11–13 Apr 2017	ORC	3.980	59.4	40.6	–	59.4	40.6
11–13 Apr 2017	Qriously	?	44.1	30.6	25.3	59.0	41.0
8–13 Apr 2017	A&G	6,048	52.9	34.1	13.0	60.8	39.2
8–12 Apr 2017	THEMİS	–	46.1	53.9	–	46.1	53.9
7–10 Apr 2017	KONDA	3,462	46.9	44.1	9.0	51.5	48.5
5–10 Apr 2017	AKAM	8,160	39.3	45.7	15.0	46.2	53.8
5–10 Apr 2017	MAK	5,500	54.6	41.4	4.0	56.5	43.5
5–10 Apr 2017	ANAR	4,189	52.0	48.0	–	52.0	48.0
8–9 Apr 2017	Gezici	1,399	46.6	43.5	9.9	51.3	48.7
9 Apr 2017	Overseas voting for Turkish expats ends						
2–8 Apr 2017	Konsensus	2,000	49.0	46.7	4.3	51.2	48.8
1–8 Apr 2017	THEMİS	600	41.7	47.3	11.0	46.9	53.1
4–6 Apr 2017	Qriously	2,593	43.5	31.1	25.4	58.3	41.7
1–4 Apr 2017	NET	2,700	45.9	47.3	6.8	49.2	50.8
1–2 Apr 2017	Gezici	–	53.3	46.7	–	53.3	46.7
15 Mar–2 Apr 2017	CHP	4,681	33.2	43.0	22.7	43.6	56.4
28–30 Mar 2017	Qriously	3,418	43.6	27.4	29.0	61.4	38.6
24–27 Mar 2017	ORC	2,740	55.4	44.6	–	55.4	44.6
27 Mar 2017	Konsensus	1,555	43.1	45.2	11.8	48.8	51.2
27 Mar 2017	Voting for Turkish expats abroad begins in 120 different overseas representations in 57 countries, as well as at customs gates.						
10–24 Mar 2017	Sonar (Note: The polling firm concluded that despite the lead of stated "Yes" votes, there were some "No" voters who claimed otherwise out of fear and a large number of "No" voters not answering at all, leading to the conclusion that "No" voters were in the lead by 51.2%))	5,000	43.34	43.30	13.36	48.8	51.2
18–22 Mar 2017	AKAM	2,032	37.0	46.2	16.8	44.5	55.5
17 Mar 2017	Gezici	–	43.5	45.5	11.0	48.9	51.1
17 Mar 2017	CHP	–	42.0	46.0	12.0	47.7	52.3
8–15 Mar 2017	Times	2,000	42.3	51.7	6.0	44.3	55.7
10–15 Mar 2017	CHP	5,000	40.2	54.8	5.0	42.3	57.7
6–13 Mar 2017	Politic's	2,753	46.2	36.9	16.9	55.7	44.3
12 Mar 2017	A diplomatic crisis erupts between Turkey and the Netherlands after the latter bars Turkish ministers from campaigning in Rotterdam						
3–9 Mar 2017	AKAM	8,120	35.6	48.2	16.2	42.4	57.6
1–7 Mar 2017	ORC	3,140	51.6	38.7	9.7	57.2	42.8
25 Feb – 2 Mar 2017	MAK	5,400	53.0	37.0	10.0	58.9	41.1
1 Mar 2017	President Recep Tayyip Erdoğan reportedly asks pro-government pollsters to stop conducting polls until the end of March						
16–21 Feb 2017	AKAM	4,060	34.9	45.2	19.9	43.6	56.4
16–19 Feb 2017	NET	3,535	43.8	45.8	10.4	48.9	51.1
10–18 Feb 2017	THEMİS	1,985	36.2	49.3	14.5	42.4	57.6
10 Feb 2017	President Recep Tayyip Erdoğan approves the referendum, with the date confirmed as Sunday, 16 April 2017						
9 Feb 2017	Sonar	–	43.0	40.0	17.0	51.8	48.2
8 Feb 2017	CHP	–	41.0	48.0	11.0	46.1	53.9
4–5 Feb 2017	Gezici	2,860	43.7	45.7	10.6	48.9	51.1
26 Jan – 1 Feb 2017	MAK	5,400	52.0	35.0	13.0	59.8	40.2
30 Jan 2017	GENAR	–	55.0	45.0	–	55.0	45.0
24–29 Jan 2017	Konsensus	1,499	44.2	41.1	14.7	51.8	48.2
26 Jan 2017	Gezici	–	41.8	58.2	–	41.8	58.2
21 Jan 2017	Parliament votes in favour of submitting all 18 proposed constitutional amendments to a referendum						
6–19 Jan 2017	MetroPoll	2,000	42.4	44.0	13.6	49.1	50.9
11–17 Jan 2017	AKAM	2,240	42.4	57.6	–	42.4	57.6
1–11 Jan 2017	ORC	2,340	62.0	38.0	–	62.0	38.0
3–10 Jan 2017	Optimar	2,043	46.3	40.0	13.7	53.6	46.4
1–25 Dec 2016	Sonar	5,000	42.3	44.6	13.1	48.7	51.3
7–16 Dec 2016	KHAS	1,000	36.9	42.2	20.9	46.6	53.4
15 Dec 2016	ORC	2,450	61.0	39.0	–	61.0	39.0
1–8 Dec 2016	The AKP and the MHP agree on draft constitutional proposals and refer them to Parliament for consultation						
21 Nov – 6 Dec 2016	İVEM	3,650	50.0	39.0	11.0	56.2	43.8
25 Nov – 3 Dec 2016	Gezici	–	42.0	58.0	–	42.0	58.0
30 Nov 2016	MetroPoll	–	49.0	51.0	-	43.3	56.7
26–27 Nov 2016	A&G	3,010	45.7	41.6	12.7	52.4	47.6
15–17 Nov 2016	Andy-AR	1,516	47.1	41.3	8.5	53.3	46.7
31 Oct 2016	The AKP present their constitutional proposals to the MHP, beginning negotiations between the two parties						
10–16 Oct 2016	ORC	21,980	55.9	36.2	7.9	60.7	39.3
11–12 Oct 2016	Prime Minister Binali Yıldırım accepts the MHP's calls for the AKP to bring their proposals to Parliament						
15–16 Jul 2016	2016 Turkish coup d'état attempt						
5–12 Jun 2016	ORC	2,240	58.9	41.1	–	58.9	41.1
1 June 2016	MetroPoll	1,200	41.9	47.5	10.5	46.9	53.1
30 May 2016	Optimar	1,508	49.3	41.6	9.1	54.2	45.8
5–6 May 2016	ORC	1,265	58.4	41.6	–	58.4	41.6
25–29 Apr 2016	MAK	5,500	57.0	33.0	10.0	63.3	36.7
25 Apr 2016	AKAM	1,214	35.0	45.7	19.3	43.4	56.6
19 Apr 2016	Gezici	–	55.2	35.5	9.3	60.9	39.1
2–6 Mar 2016	ORC	4,176	57.0	43.0	–	57.0	43.0
12 Feb 2016	İVEM	–	60.0	31.0	9.0	65.9	34.1
27 Jan – 3 Feb 2016	ORC	8,329	56.1	43.9	–	56.1	43.9
1 Jan 2016	GENAR	4,900	55.0	40.8	4.2	57.4	42.6
18 May 2015	Gezici	4,860	23.8	76.2	–	23.8	76.2
23 Feb 2015	Gezici	3,840	23.2	76.8	–	23.2	76.8
3 Feb 2015	MetroPoll	–	34.3	42.2	23.5	44.8	55.2

=== Overseas ===
Date(s) conducted	Polling organisation/client	Sample size	Considering undecided vote			Considering only Yes/No vote	
Date(s) conducted	Polling organisation/client	Sample size	Yes	No	Undecided	Yes	No
16 Apr 2017	Overseas results		59.5	40.5	–	59.5	40.5
10 Apr 2017	MAK	Exit poll	62.0	38.0	–	62.0	38.0
27 Mar–9 Apr 2017	Overseas voting for Turkish expats takes place in 120 representations in 57 countries.						

== Results ==
=== Overall results ===
Choice	Nationwide votes	%	Overseas votes	%	Customs votes	%	Total votes	%
"Yes"	24,325,633	51.18	778,833	59.46	52,997	54.17	25,157,463	51.41
No	23,203,316	48.82	530,988	40.54	44,837	45.83	23,779,141	48.59
Valid votes	47,528,949	98.25	1,309,821	98.80	97,834	99.23	48,936,604	98.27
Invalid/blank votes	845,627	1.75	15,861	1.20	763	0.77	862,251	1.73
Turnout	48,374,576	87.45	1,325,682	44.60	98,597	3.32	49,798,855	85.43
Registered voters	55,319,222		2,972,676				58,291,898	
Source: Supreme Electoral Council of Turkey (YSK)

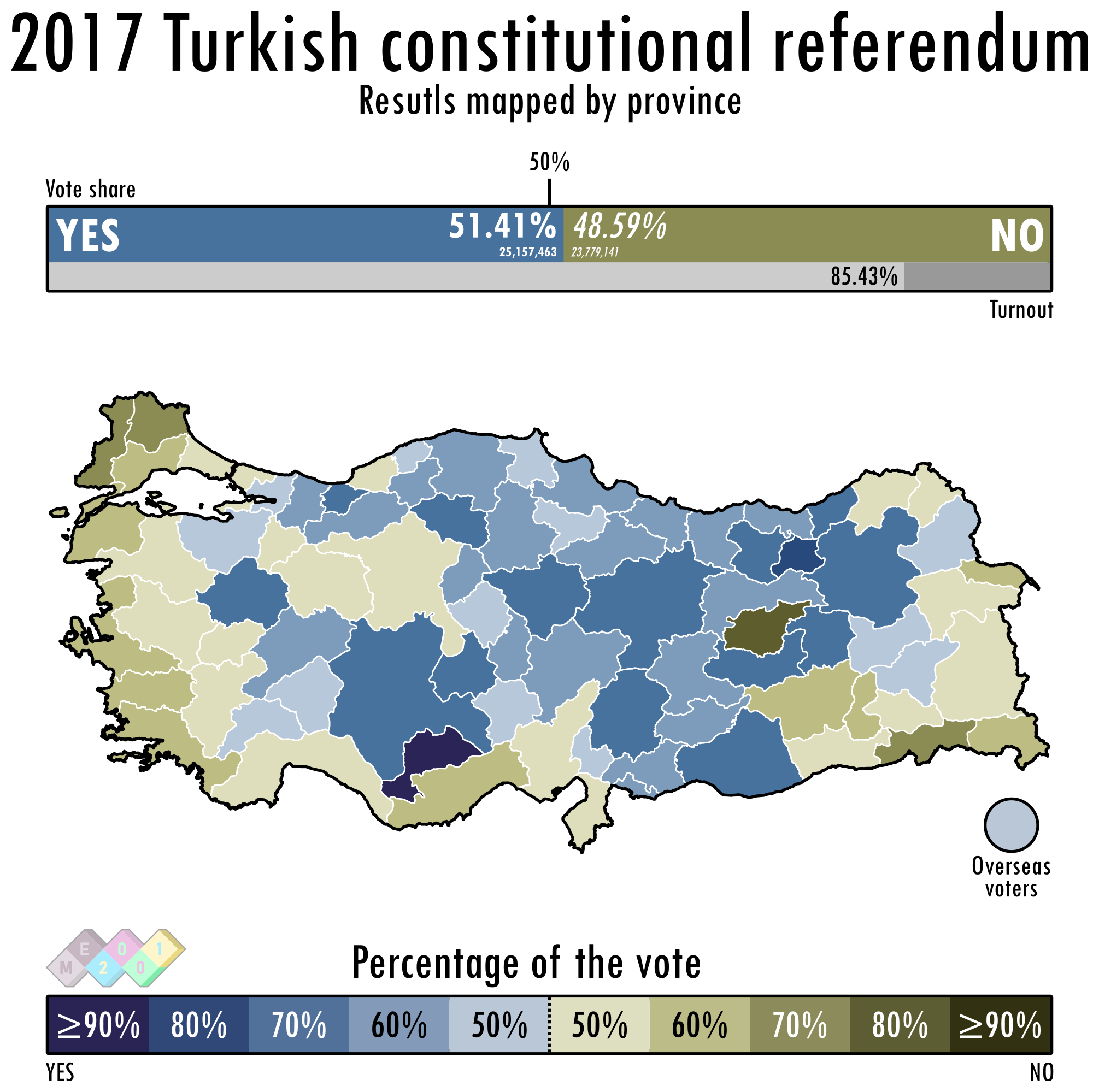
Referendum results by province

=== Results by province ===
Province	Registered voters	People voted	Valid votes	Invalid votes	Yes	Yes (%)	No	No (%)	Turnout (%)
Adana	1,511,884	1,302,341	1,281,208	21,133	536,265	41,85	745,021	58,15	86,14
Adıyaman	391,115	336,098	329,957	6,141	230,434	69,83	99,567	30,17	85,93
Afyonkarahisar	501,742	446,104	435,854	10,250	281,377	64,58	154,317	35,42	88,91
Ağrı	293,340	208,469	202,528	5,941	87,145	43,06	115,224	56,94	71,07
Aksaray	261,232	220,403	215,746	4,657	162,795	75,57	52,623	24,43	84,37
Amasya	242,873	219,528	215,727	3,801	121,217	56,29	94,136	43,71	90,39
Ankara	3,860,847	3,467,364	3,415,697	51,667	1,669,047	48,87	1,746,320	51,13	89,81
Antalya	1,639,364	1,429,278	1,403,836	25,442	574,644	40,94	828,862	59,06	87,18
Ardahan	67,650	54,178	52,984	1,194	23,460	44,36	29,420	55,64	80,09
Artvin	128,132	108,868	106,478	2,390	49,982	46,95	56,483	53,05	84,97
Aydın	795,526	699,772	686,887	12,885	245,431	35,74	441,276	64,26	87,96
Balıkesir	919,852	824,390	810,339	14,051	368,817	45,53	441,157	54,47	89,62
Bartın	144,930	124,867	120,904	3,963	67,739	56,03	53,160	43,97	86,16
Batman	329,509	273,462	264,515	8,947	96,424	36,48	167,917	63,52	82,99
Bayburt	57,071	46,772	46,060	712	37,620	81,67	8,446	18,33	81,95
Bilecik	151,865	137,448	134,821	2,627	65,897	48,89	68,895	51,11	90,51
Bingöl	175,142	137,171	132,260	4,911	95,959	72,67	36,087	27,33	78,32
Bitlis	194,243	152,573	148,022	4,551	87,871	59,36	60,163	40,64	78,55
Bolu	221,967	197,371	193,847	3,524	120,733	62,29	73,101	37,71	88,92
Burdur	194,288	173,499	169,001	4,498	87,393	51,73	81,556	48,27	89,3
Bursa	2,109,773	1,885,058	1,856,692	28,366	987,667	53,21	868,610	46,79	89,35
Çanakkale	398,024	359,839	353,965	5,874	139,995	39,55	213,940	60,45	90,41
Çankırı	130,649	110,757	108,740	2,017	79,872	73,46	28,856	26,54	84,77
Çorum	387,151	346,172	340,208	5,964	219,394	64,50	120,814	35,50	89,42
Denizli	736,208	664,554	651,182	13,372	289,876	44,53	361,109	55,47	90,27
Diyarbakır	992,819	801,500	776,822	24,678	251,995	32,42	524,827	67,58	80,73
Düzce	262,542	236,676	232,598	4,078	163,955	70,55	68,427	29,45	90,15
Edirne	308,502	272,510	267,420	5,090	78,877	29,50	188,469	70,50	88,33
Elazığ	406,636	342,529	335,394	7,135	240,773	71,82	94,449	28,18	84,23
Erzincan	154,333	135,686	133,719	1,967	80,908	60,50	52,816	39,50	87,92
Erzurum	484,753	410,871	403,596	7,275	300,545	74,50	102,869	25,50	84,76
Eskişehir	636,858	567,634	558,617	9,017	236,807	42,43	321,273	57,57	89,13
Gaziantep	1,180,938	982,983	967,090	15,893	603,894	62,44	363,198	37,56	83,24
Giresun	327,882	271,898	266,896	5,002	164,575	61,69	102,219	38,31	82,93
Gümüşhane	101,312	74,105	72,651	1,454	54,601	75,16	18,050	24,84	73,15
Hakkâri	162,006	131,017	126,793	4,224	40,940	32,35	85,630	67,65	80,87
Hatay	1,018,200	892,478	879,383	13,095	401,057	45,64	477,724	54,36	87,65
Iğdır	117,904	90,461	88,553	1,908	30,844	34,86	57,629	65,14	76,72
Isparta	310,003	271,693	265,726	5,967	148,868	56,04	116,775	43,96	87,64
Istanbul	10,529,030	9,340,205	9,207,590	132,615	4,479,747	48,65	4,727,761	51,35	88,71
İzmir	3,179,748	2,832,920	2,790,403	42,517	870,860	31,22	1,918,700	68,78	89,09
Kahramanmaraş	719,927	629,154	619,744	9,410	458,093	73,95	161,386	26,05	87,39
Karabük	173,150	150,064	146,615	3,449	89,042	60,73	57,574	39,27	86,67
Karaman	171,482	151,676	147,675	4,001	94,247	63,85	53,370	36,15	88,45
Kars	181,880	141,812	139,109	2,703	70,893	50,99	68,131	49,01	77,97
Kastamonu	278,876	232,890	227,608	5,282	147,567	64,84	80,013	35,16	83,51
Kayseri	932,483	834,477	822,636	11,841	557,172	67,75	265,203	32,25	89,49
Kilis	81,705	70,583	69,373	1,210	44,513	64,13	24,895	35,87	86,39
Kırıkkale	197,697	169,078	166,262	2,816	103,614	62,44	62,335	37,56	85,52
Kırklareli	270,019	242,929	239,126	3,803	68,553	28,67	170,568	71,33	89,97
Kırşehir	163,309	138,471	135,883	2,588	72,362	53,30	63,389	46,70	84,79
Kocaeli	1,301,355	1,166,946	1,147,261	19,685	650,174	56,69	496,716	43,31	89,67
Konya	1,475,597	1,298,525	1,274,212	24,313	928,516	72,88	345,598	27,12	88
Kütahya	421,028	379,510	371,589	7,921	261,242	70,29	110,410	29,71	90,14
Malatya	543,742	471,869	465,177	6,692	323,631	69,57	141,537	30,43	86,78
Manisa	1,031,668	933,101	914,008	19,093	417,267	45,67	496,458	54,33	90,45
Mardin	455,288	374,330	365,386	8,944	149,558	40,96	215,581	59,04	82,22
Mersin	1,247,662	1,096,490	1,077,359	19,131	387,627	35,99	689,508	64,01	87,88
Muğla	691,124	611,470	601,091	10,379	184,520	30,73	415,901	69,27	88,47
Muş	225,416	177,955	172,684	5,271	87,314	50,56	85,370	49,44	78,95
Nevşehir	207,762	182,270	179,211	3,059	117,548	65,59	61,663	34,41	87,73
Niğde	236,211	201,836	201,836	4,268	118,150	59,82	79,344	40,18	85,45
Ordu	549,249	454,428	444,872	9,556	275,344	61,90	169,481	38,10	82,74
Osmaniye	350,988	299,183	293,778	5,405	169,652	57,81	123,811	42,19	85,24
Rize	245,097	208,495	205,186	3,309	155,030	75,56	50,157	24,44	85,07
Sakarya	690,429	616,766	606,975	9,791	412,849	68,08	193,588	31,92	89,33
Samsun	941,614	812,278	798,235	14,043	507,267	63,56	290,837	36,44	86,26
Şanlıurfa	1,029,644	861,730	845,908	15,822	599,092	70,82	246,812	29,18	83,69
Siirt	176,845	147,212	142,486	4,726	68,242	47,93	74,143	52,07	83,24
Sinop	155,463	130,162	126,975	3,187	73,488	57,90	53,437	42,10	83,73
Şırnak	255,760	214,666	207,089	7,577	58,828	28,41	148,213	71,59	83,93
Sivas	433,325	374,007	368,134	5,873	262,506	71,30	105,683	28,70	86,31
Tekirdağ	710,364	632,095	622,595	9,500	242,627	38,98	379,809	61,02	88,98
Tokat	417,661	365,070	359,023	6,047	226,999	63,27	131,772	36,73	87,41
Trabzon	568,504	484,270	475,989	8,281	316,298	66,47	159,573	33,53	85,18
Tunceli	60,801	50,912	50,337	575	9,844	19,58	40,429	80,42	83,74
Uşak	262,877	237,260	232,316	4,944	109,270	47,04	123,017	52,96	90,26
Van	619,947	468,593	453,159	15,434	193,584	42,72	259,575	57,28	75,59
Yalova	172,160	147,039	144,637	2,402	71,59	49,73	72,708	50,27	85,41
Yozgat	295,051	246,192	242,249	3,943	179,543	74,24	62,291	25,76	83,44
Zonguldak	447,774	387,640	377,314	10,326	186,077	49,33	191,099	50,67	86,57
Nationwide results	58,366,647	49,799,163	48,934,116	865,047	25,157,025	51,41	23,777,091	48,59	85,32

=== Overseas results ===
Country	Yes	Yes (%)	No	No (%)
Albania	153	41.80%	213	58.20%
Algeria	356	43.00%	472	57.00%
Australia	5,960	41.82%	8,290	58.18%
Austria	38,215	73.23%	13,972	26.77%
Azerbaijan	1,024	38.31%	1,649	61.69%
Bahrain	69	13.56%	440	86.44%
Belgium	54,083	74.98%	18,044	25.02%
Bosnia and Herzegovina	750	61.83%	463	38.17%
Bulgaria	365	28.65%	909	71.35%
Canada	3,247	27.92%	8,384	72.08%
China	213	23.77%	683	76.23%
Czech Republic	73	12.54%	509	87.46%
Denmark	6,604	60.63%	4,288	39.37%
Egypt	259	59.00%	180	41.00%
Finland	558	28.45%	1,403	71.55%
France	91,266	64.85%	49,475	35.15%
Georgia	285	40.66%	416	59.34%
Germany	412,149	63.07%	241,353	36.93%
Greece	176	22.62%	602	77.38%
Hungary	232	25.75%	669	74.25%
Iran	121	45.32%	146	54.68%
Iraq	119	34.59%	225	65.41%
Ireland	173	19.93%	695	80.07%
Israel	284	43.43%	370	56.57%
Italy	2,135	37.94%	3,492	62.06%
Japan	416	36.11%	736	63.89%
Jordan	349	75.87%	111	24.13%
Kazakhstan	636	41.41%	900	58.59%
Kosovo	404	57.14%	303	42.86%
Kuwait	191	23.38%	626	76.62%
Kyrgyzstan	499	57.36%	371	42.64%
Lebanon	1,058	93.88%	69	6.12%
Luxembourg	5,987	62.86%	3,538	37.14%
Macedonia	618	57.97%	448	42.03%
Netherlands	82,672	70.94%	33,871	29.06%
New Zealand	32	17.68%	149	82.32%
Northern Cyprus	19,225	45.18%	23,324	54.82%
Norway	2,193	57.20%	1,641	42.80%
Oman	138	24.04%	436	75.96%
Poland	302	25.61%	877	74.39%
Qatar	241	18.89%	1,035	81.11%
Romania	824	44.64%	1,022	55.36%
Russia	833	26.02%	2,368	73.98%
Saudi Arabia	4,475	55.06%	3,653	44.94%
Singapore	284	44.31%	357	55.69%
South Africa	126	36.84%	216	63.16%
Spain	172	13.32%	1,119	86.68%
Sudan	240	65.93%	124	34.07%
Sweden	4,367	47.09%	4,902	52.91%
Switzerland	19,181	38.08%	31,193	61.92%
Thailand	27	12.92%	182	87.02%
Turkmenistan	510	43.74%	656	56.26%
Ukraine	341	35.74	613	64.26%
United Arab Emirates	395	13.31%	2,572	86.69%
United Kingdom	7,177	20.26%	28,247	79.79%
United States	5,296	16.20%	27,397	83.80%
Uzbekistan	169	53.65%	146	46.35%
Border Gates	52,961	54.17%	44,816	45.83%
Overseas results	831,208	59.09%	575,365	40.91%

== Reactions ==
=== Sovereign states ===
- Austria – Foreign Minister Sebastian Kurz expressed his opposition to Turkey's accession to the European Union.
- Azerbaijan – President Ilham Aliyev was the first international leader to call the Turkish President, saying that the result demonstrated "the Turkish people's great support" for Erdoğan's policy.
- Belarus – President Alexander Lukashenko congratulated Turkey on the successful referendum.
- China – Chinese Deputy Prime Minister Liu Yandong, who was visiting Turkey at the time of the referendum, congratulated Erdoğan and the Turkish people on the victory.
- Cyprus – Government spokesman Nicos Christodoulides said that Cyprus hopes Turkey's stance will move the peace talks forward toward the stated goal of reunifying the island as a federation.
- France – President François Hollande stated that the Turkish people have the right to decide how to organize political institutions, but the referendum results show that Turkey is divided about the reforms.
- Georgia – Prime Minister Giorgi Kvirikashvili congratulated Turkey on the referendum results and remarked that Turkey's stable development was important to Georgia.
- Germany – Chancellor Angela Merkel said the tight referendum result showed that Turkey is divided and reports over irregularities should be taken seriously. Peter Altmaier, Merkel's chief of staff, said that Germany "would respect a result that came about in a free and democratic vote". Asked if the result was indeed free and democratic, he said he would wait for the verdict of election observers.
- Hungary – Hungarian prime minister Viktor Orbán called Erdoğan to congratulate him immediately after the referendum.
- Iran – Iranian Foreign Minister, Mohammad Javad Zarif, extended congratulations to his Turkish counterpart, Mevlüt Çavuşoğlu.
- Iraq – Iraqi Vice President Osama al-Nujaifi sent a message to congratulate the Turkish President.
- Kazakhstan – President Nursultan Nazarbayev sent a telegram of congratulations to Erdoğan.
- Nigeria – President Muhammadu Buhari has congratulated the people and government of Turkey on the successful conclusion of the country's referendum.
- Pakistan – President Mamnoon Hussain and Prime Minister Nawaz Sharif also congratulated the Turkish people on the victory.
- Palestine – President Mahmoud Abbas extended congratulations to the Turkish President.
- Qatar – Qatar's Emir Tamim bin Hamad Al Thani also congratulated the Turkish President on victory.
- Russia – President Vladimir Putin called the Turkish President to extend congratulations on behalf of the Russian people.
- Saudi Arabia – Saudi Arabia's cabinet congratulated Erdoğan and the Turkish people on the successful referendum of constitutional amendments.
- Somalia – Somali President Mohamed Farmajo has congratulated the people and government of Turkey on the successful referendum on Turkey's future
- United States – President Donald Trump called the Turkish President to congratulate him on the victory.

=== Regional organisations ===
- European Union – The Spokesman for European Commission President, Jean-Claude Juncker, expressed concerns over allegations of irregularities in the referendum and called on Turkish civil authorities to launch transparent investigations into the claims.

== See also ==
- 2007 Turkish constitutional referendum
- 2010 Turkish constitutional referendum
- 2017 Dutch–Turkish diplomatic incident
- 2018 Turkish general election
- 2018 Turkish parliamentary election
- 2018 Turkish presidential election
- Media in Turkey
- Democracy
