= TwitterCounter =

Defunct analytics service for Twitter

Twitter Counter was an analytics service for Twitter, that ceased operations on November 5, 2018. It used to provide statistics of Twitter usage, and also offered a variety of widgets and buttons that people could add to their blogs, websites or social network profiles to show recent Twitter visitors and number of followers.

== History ==
Twitter Counter started as a self funded startup based in Amsterdam, Netherlands on June 12, 2008. It is a third-party application and the Twitter name is licensed from Twitter, Inc.

== Acquisitions ==
The service has received some attention in the past for acquiring Qwitter and Twitaholic, a competing company.

== Issues and controversies ==
In 2017 TwitterCounter was held responsible for being hacked by Turkish hackers, using the service to advertise for a yes in the Turkish constitutional referendum. The hackers posted tweets with the hashtags nazialmanya and nazihollanda from Twitter accounts of prominent users who had granted TwitterCounter access to their Twitter accounts. TwitterCounter took its service offline following that hack and later blocked any option for actions to be taken by its users until an exhaustive external investigation and audit were performed on the company's upgraded security measures by Fox-IT of the NRC Group. Those auditors found that such abuse of TwitterCounter's service was highly unlikely following the cyber-security related work the company has put in.
