= Workers' Peasants' Party of Turkey =

Workers' Peasants' Party of Turkey may refer to:

- Revolutionary Workers' Peasants' Party of Turkey (1969-1977)
- Workers' Peasants' Party of Turkey (1978) (1978-1981)
- Workers' Peasants' Party of Turkey (2010) (2010-)
