= AYP =

AYP may refer to:

== Places ==
- Albany Park railway station, UK, station code
- Coronel FAP Alfredo Mendívil Duarte Airport, Ayacucho, Peru, IATA code

== Language ==
- Qeltu Mesopotamian Arabic (ISO 639-3 ayp), a variety of Arabic

== Music ==
- American Youth Philharmonic Orchestra, part of AYPO

== Organisations ==
- Adequate Yearly Progress, per the US No Child Left Behind Act
- Crescent Star Party (Ayyıldız Partisi), a political party in Turkey
- Alaska–Yukon–Pacific Exposition, a world's fair held in Seattle in 1909
- Asom Yuva Parishad, the youth wing of Asom Gana Parishad
