= Toplumcu Kurtuluş Partisi =

Toplumcu Kurtuluş Partisi may refer to:

- Communal Liberation Party (Toplumcu Kurtuluş Partisi), a political party in Northern Cyprus.
- Socialist Liberation Party (Toplumcu Kurtuluş Partisi), a political party in Turkey.
