= 2017 Turkish constitutional referendum "Yes" campaign =

Kararımız Evet
- Campaign: 2017 Turkish constitutional referendum
- Affiliation: Justice and Development Party; Nationalist Movement Party; Other smaller parties and organisations (See list)
- Status: Won election
- Slogan(s): 'Güçlü Türkiye için ben de varım' (I'm in for a strong Turkey) 'Türkiye için vazgeçilemez bir yeminimiz var' (An irrevocable oath for Turkey)
- Chant: Kararımız Evet (Our decision is Yes); Tabi ki Evet (Yes, of course)

The 2017 Turkish constitutional referendum 'Yes' campaign was a campaign headed by numerous political parties, non-governmental organisations, individuals and media outlets that successfully campaigned for a 'Yes' vote in the 2017 Turkish constitutional referendum. A vote for 'Yes' meant the transformation of Turkey from a parliamentary republic into a presidential republic with an executive presidency. The 'Yes' campaign was rivalled by parties and organisations that led the 'No' campaign. Neither campaign had a united or centralised campaign structure, with rallies and campaign events having been largely organised by political parties independent of each other.

The 'Yes' campaign was predominantly led by Justice and Development Party (AKP) politicians, as well as Nationalist Movement Party (MHP) politicians loyal to leader Devlet Bahçeli. Initially expecting a 7 February start to the campaign, the AKP eventually kicked off their official campaign on 25 February with a presentation by Prime Minister Binali Yıldırım at the Ankara sports stadium. Amid poor showings in opinion polls in February, Erdoğan reportedly asked pro-government pollsters to suspend their opinion polling until the end of March, while proposals for a joint electoral rally by both leading AKP and MHP politicians has also been proposed.

When Turkish ministers, in an illegal move under Turkish law, tried to travel to the Netherlands to promote the 'Yes' campaign to Turkish citizens living there, they were barred from doing so by the Dutch, causing the 2017 Dutch–Turkish diplomatic incident.

== Supporters ==
=== Political parties ===
The following political parties have announced their support for a 'Yes' vote.

Party		Leader	Political orientation	Slogans		Ref.
Party		Leader	Political orientation	(Turkey) In Turkish	In English	Ref.
AK Party	Justice and Development Party	Binali Yıldırım	Right-wing	Kararımız Evet	Our decision is Yes	
MHP	Nationalist Movement Party (party executive)	Devlet Bahçeli	Nationalist/Far-right	Türkiye için vazgeçilemez bir yeminimiz var	We have an indispensable vow for Turkey	
BBP	Great Union Party (party executive)	Mustafa Destici	Far-right			
Yeni Dünya	New World Party	Emanullah Gündüz	Right-wing			
HÜDA PAR	Free Cause Party	Zekeriya Yapıcıoğlu	Islamist/Far-right			
Osmanlı	Ottoman Party (conditional yes)	İbrahim Ünye	Far-right			

=== NGOs and other groups ===
Name	Type	Political orientation	Ref.
Ottoman (Osmanoğlu) family	Former Ottoman dynasty	–	
Independent Industrialists and Businessmen Association (MÜSİAD)	Business organization	Right-wing	
Ottoman Hearths	Organisation	Right-wing	
Confederation of Public Servants Trade Unions (Memur-Sen)	Trade union	Centre-right	

== Justice and Development Party (AKP) campaign ==
=== Domestic campaign ===
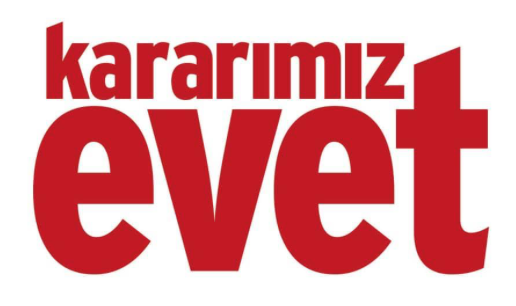
The AK Party's 'Yes' campaign logo. Kararımız evet translates to 'our decision is yes'

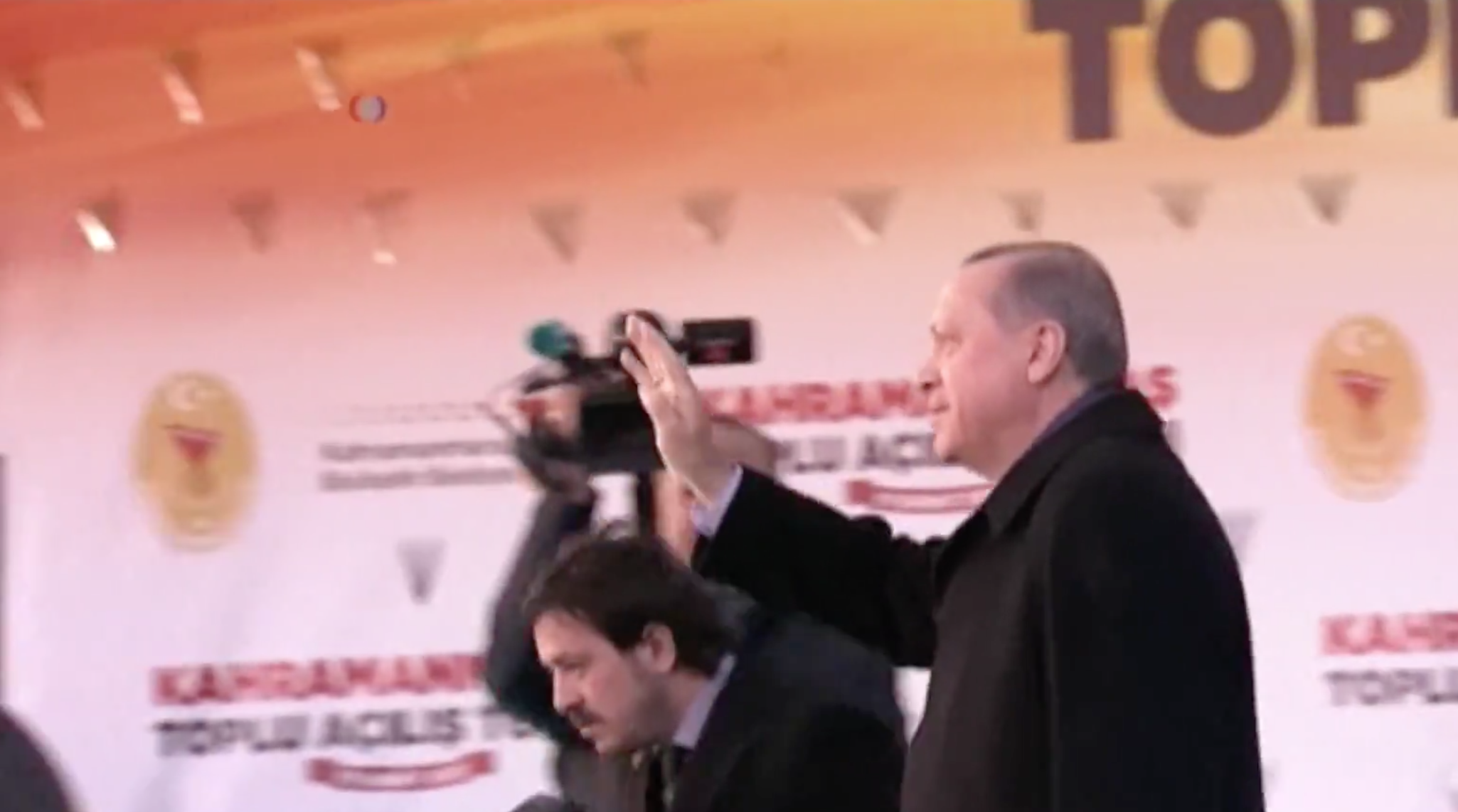
Recep Tayyip Erdoğan campaigning for a 'Yes' vote in Kahramanmaraş, 17 February 2017

The AKP campaign has primarily focused around the concept of a 'great and strong Turkey' (Büyük ve Güçlü Türkiye) during its campaign, while senior politicians have also emphasised the need to establish an executive presidency in order to stop terrorism and grow the economy. Opposition politicians have claimed that the AKP has been unable to justify the proposed constitutional changes, resorting to a populist campaign as a result.

The AKP began its campaign on 25 February with a presentation by Prime Minister Binali Yıldırım, with the reserved seats being notably empty during the event. President Erdoğan began his campaigns under the guise of 'public opening' rallies, a campaign method similar to the one used by the Presidency in the June 2015 general election. Following the first public opening rally on 17 February in Kahramanmaraş, Erdoğan was criticised for making a perceived u-turn in his speech, first claiming that he would not desire an executive presidency for his personal gain but then claiming that the project was 'his own' just five minutes later.

Erdoğan and Yıldırım have both been heavily criticised for associating 'No' voters with terrorist organisations, both implicitly and directly on numerous occasions. During a speech to AKP Members of Parliament, Yıldırım claimed that they would vote 'Yes' because the Kurdistan Workers' Party (PKK) and the Fethullah Gülen Terrorist Organisation (FETÖ) were supporting 'No'. At the same time, Erdoğan claimed that those who were opposing the changes were siding with the coup plotters behind the 2016 Turkish coup d'état attempt. Their claims fell into disrepute when it emerged that FETÖ was one of the first proponents of an executive presidency in 1997, having supported the AKP government when they came to power in 2002 until 2013. The PKK have also long favoured an executive presidency in return for greater independence in Kurdish populated regions, with members of the pro-Kurdish Peoples' Democratic Party (HDP) implicitly speaking out in favour of a 'Yes' vote.

A last Saturday before the referendum, Erdogan spoke to his followers in Istanbul for the final occasion, urging citizens to vote in favor of the constitutional amendments. He emphasized that the proposed system would enhance the stable and safe conditions necessary for the country's progress.

=== Overseas campaign ===
Overseas election campaigning, even in diplomatic missions, is illegal under Turkish law; yet most political parties in Turkey, including the ruling AKP, have flouted the law.

Although Yıldırım managed to hold a rally in Oberhausen, Germany on 18 February, foreign governments have reacted negatively to attempts by Turkish politicians to hold overseas campaign events targeting voters abroad. The Foreign Minister of Austria, Sebastian Kurz, stated that he did not want Erdoğan to visit the country to hold a campaign event because it would create division amongst Turkish citizens living in Austria. The intervention resulted in an angry reaction from Deputy Prime Minister Numan Kurtulmuş, who claimed that Turkey's referandum was not the concern of the Austrian government. In Germany, events due to be held by Economy Minister Nihat Zeybekçi and Justice Minister Bekir Bozdağ were cancelled by local municipalities, who stated that the venues for the events had insufficient capacity. The developments were harshly criticised by the Turkish government as well as the main opposition.

== Nationalist Movement Party (MHP) campaign ==
The official party executive of the far-right Nationalist Movement Party (MHP), led by Devlet Bahçeli, announced in late 2016 that they would co-operate with the AKP as they sought to draft a new constitution. This was met by opposition due to the MHP's long-standing staunch opposition to the presidential system, a policy also present in their November 2015 general election manifesto. Bahçeli himself was heavily criticised for the sudden u-turn, with videos comparing his sudden change of course to his past speeches where he strongly opposed the presidential system receiving record views on social media. The MHP official executive claimed that Bahçeli was trying to avoid an early election, which would have been a possibility if the AKP failed to put their proposals forward to a referendum. An early general election would have likely meant the MHP falling below the 10% election threshold and losing all their parliamentary seats. In January 2017, Bahçeli announced that they would also support a 'Yes' vote in the referendum, in addition to providing parliamentary support during the voting process.

The MHP executive's decision to support a 'Yes' vote was met by strong opposition from the party's voter base, leading Bahçeli to claim that the party 'didn't have' a voter base. 7 MPs amongst the 40-strong MHP parliamentary group rebelled, leading to the eventual expulsion of four of them from the party. A wave of resignations from the party's local and district associations followed. In response to the start of an alternate 'No' campaign by high-profile MHP politicians, Bahçeli claimed that those who were disobeying the party line were attempting to 'defame' the MHP and did not represent Turkish nationalism. In a further speech during a regular parliamentary party briefing, Bahçeli stated that he would support Recep Tayyip Erdoğan in an election if he was faced with the choice of choosing between Erdoğan and 'No' supporters such as Doğu Perinçek. He further went on to claim that those asking him why he was supporting a 'Yes' vote should 'mind their own business.'

Bahçeli began his campaigning in Konya on 12 February 2017, speaking to a hall which was lambasted by the pro-'No' media for being significantly emptier than expected. Many polls suggest that a significant majority of MHP voters are 'No' supporters, with this figure rising to 90% in some estimates. Most polls put the percentage of 'No' voters in the MHP at between 50% and 80%, with definite 'Yes' voters remaining at 20–25%.

Many theories have been put forward by politicians and journalists to explain Bahçeli's sudden change of policy, with some claiming that Erdoğan agreed to make him his vice president under the new presidential regime. It was also reported in the Aydınlık newspaper that three forms of blackmail had been made to the MHP by the AKP. The first concerned the threat of a snap election, in which the MHP would likely fail to secure 10% of the vote and win seats in Parliament. The second concerned Bahçeli's own seat as leader of the MHP, a position from which he was almost defeated during the 2016 Nationalist Movement Party Extraordinary Congress. Bahçeli was able to hang on to his leadership by avoiding a party congress with the help of the pro-government Supreme Electoral Council and the government-backed judiciary, but it was claimed that the government would cease to assist Bahçeli in maintaining his position should he not agree to campaign for a 'Yes' vote. A final threat was perceived to be a personal revelation regarding Bahçeli, in the form of an embarrassing video tape or a recording that would disgrace him and the MHP, which the government would release if Bahçeli refused to comply.

== See also ==
- 2017 Turkish constitutional referendum 'No' campaign
