= Freedom and Socialism Party =

Freedom and Socialism Party Özgürlük ve Sosyalizm Partisi
- Abbreviation: ÖSP
- Chairman: Sinan Çiftyürek
- Founded: 21 December 2011
- Headquarters: Ankara, Turkey
- Membership (2026): ▲102
- Ideology: Socialism; Democratic socialism Marxism; Pro-Kurdish federalism Anti-imperialism
- Political position: Left-Wing
- Colors: Yellow, Red and Black

The Freedom and Socialism Party (Turkish: Özgürlük ve Sosyalizm Partisi, ÖSP) is a Kurdish-based democratic socialist and federalist political party in Turkey. The party mentioned as Partiya Azadî û Sosyalîzmê in Kurdish.

== Development ==
Communist Party of Kurdistan cadres including Sinan Çiftyürek and Mehmet Akyol announced the founding of a new frame for a legal party named Mesopotamia Socialist Party (Mezopotamya Sosyalist Partisi) after a November 2003 meeting in Gaziantep. The initiative for Mesopotamia Socialist Party merged with the Socialist Party Founders Committee, another faction of Kurdish socialists in October 2010. The new group was named the Freedom and Socialism Party and it was officially founded on 19 December 2011 with Çiftyürek as the chairman.

== Ideology ==
Founder and chairman Sinan Çiftyürek describes the Freedom and Socialist Party as "a workers' party with a socialist line" and with no particular ethnic emphasis albeit its Kurdish background. The party propagates a federation of Turkish and Kurdish peoples "on a condition of equality".
