= National Party (Turkey) =

National Party Ulusal Parti
- Leader: Gökçe Fırat Çulhaoğlu
- Founded: 2010
- Headquarters: Ahmet Mithat Efendi Sokak No: 14 Çankaya, Ankara
- Membership (2026): ▼27
- Ideology: Turkish nationalism Socialism; Kemalism; Pan-Turkism; Ulusalcılık; Third Worldism
- Political position: Left-wing

The National Party (Turkish: Ulusal Parti) is a nationalist party in Turkey. The party was founded by Gökçe Fırat Çulhaoğlu in 2010.

This party's main idols are Mustafa Kemal Atatürk, Doğan Avcıoğlu and Mirsaid Sultan-Galiev. Unlike other socialist parties in Turkey, they often criticise Marxism for being Eurocentrist. They describe Kemalism as socialism with Turkish characteristics. They also idolize socialist, third worldist and left-wing nationalist leaders like Yasser Arafat, Gamal Abdel Nasser, Hugo Chávez, Josip Broz Tito and Patrice Lumumba.

This party supports Turkish nationalism against imperialism and separatism, socialism against capitalism, and secularism against fundamentalism.

Despite this party mainly supports civic and cultural kind of nationalism, they also have Pan-Turkist tendencies. They support an aggressive foreign policy against Armenia and Greece. They are against any alliance with NATO, the European Union, China or Russia. They are in favour of a Turkic union.

They are often accused of being chauvinistic and racist in Kurdish issue, because of mottos like there is not a Kurdish problem but a Kurdish invasion, I trade with Turks, therefore my money doesn't flow to the PKK, save your cities from invasion (of Kurds), etc. However Gökçe Fırat claims, Kurdish ethnicity and language are artificial, which were created by imperialist powers, especially Tsarist Russia and British Empire. He also noted: for us, in Turkey there is only one nation and it's Turkish nation. We don't recognise any other ethnic and national identities. That's why we don't discriminate anyone, we see every citizen as Turks.

The party publishes Türksolu and İleri.
