= Revolutionary People's Party (Turkey, legal) =

Revolutionary People's Party Devrimci Halk Partisi
- Abbreviation: DEV-PARTİ
- Chairman: Celal Özcan
- Founded: 28 September 2011
- Dissolved: 20 July 2017
- Headquarters: Ankara, Turkey
- Ideology: Marxism; Left-wing populism People's democracy Anti-imperialism
- Political position: Left-wing

The Revolutionary People's Party (Turkish: Devrimci Halk Partisi, DEV-PARTİ) was a Marxist anti-imperialist political party in Turkey. The DEV-PARTİ was founded on 28 September 2011 and led by Celal Özcan. The party was dissolved on 20 July 2017.

== See also ==
- Revolutionary People's Party (Turkey, illegal)
