= Gökçe Fırat Çulhaoğlu =

Turkish journalist and writer (born 1974)

Minister of National Party
- Incumbent
- Assumed office 16 March 2010

Personal details
- Born: 8 March 1974 (age 52) Istanbul, Turkey
- Education: Marmara University
- Occupation: Journalist, writer, politician

Gökçe Fırat Çulhaoğlu (born 8 March 1974) is the chairman of National Party and journalist. He is the Head-Columnist of Turkish Left. He was arrested and sent to prison with the accusation of "Insulting the President" on 31 May 2015, but released after 18 days of imprisonment. On 31 August 2016 he was detained again and accused of aiding a terrorist organization. He would have been released on 31 March 2017, if not on the same day a second prosecution was opened and he was again taken in custody. This time he was accused of wanting to "overthrow the government and the constitutional order" in the "FETÖ media leg" trial. On 8 March 2018, he was sentenced to 6 years and 3 months' imprisonment for being a member of a terror organization.

== Bibliography ==
Çulhaoğlu is the author of 22 books:

- Turkish Republic is Entrusted to Us
- Kuvayi Milliye: National and International Resources of Turkish Revolution
- The Colonization Assault of USA from Afghanistan to Iraq
- Turkish Ordeal: Kemalism and Defense of the Motherland
- Roadmap of National Powers: "Independence or Death"
- Besieged by the Ally
- Six Arrows of Atatürk
- Genuine Kemalism
- National Leftist Ideology
- Kurdish-Islamist Fascism
- Invasion: Concealed Facts about the Kurdish Question and the Kurdish Invasion
- Exhausted Democrats: Remain Silent No More
- Attaining to Mustafa Kemal
- Kemalism and Socialism
- My Martyr! My Courageous Lad! You didn't Die for No Reason
- Turkish Socialism – Kemalism: The Very Socialism in Demand
- Kurdish Racism and Fascism
- Kemalism against Collaboration: National Resolution
- Anatolia: The Turkish Motherland
- From the Slaughter of Janissaries to Ergenekon Plot: The Dissolution of the Turkish Army
- We are the Soldiers of Mustafa Kemal
- War of Parallel States
- Documentation of AKP-PKK Alliance
