= National Struggle Party =

National Struggle Party Milli Mücadele Partisi
- Abbreviation: MMP
- Leader: Ahmet Kaya
- Founded: November 25, 2014
- Headquarters: Ankara
- Membership (2026): 0
- Ideology: Turkish nationalism Kemalism
- Colors: Dark red

The National Struggle Party (Turkish: Milli Mücadele Partisi, abbreviated MMP) is a nationalist political party in Turkey. It was formed by Ahmet Kaya, whose Turkish nationalism has been contrasted with the Kurdish nationalist singer of the same name. The MMP's founders claim that it is neither a rival nor an enemy of any other established party, even though its ideology is close to the Nationalist Movement Party (MHP). The pro-Justice and Development Party (AKP) newspaper Yeni Akit accused the party of being founded by supporters of Fethullah Gülen after failing to gain influence within the MHP. However, the party also advocates Kemalism, which is in contrast with the Islamist political agenda of Gülen. The party currently has no representation in the Grand National Assembly and is yet to contest any elections.
