= Çetin Özaçıkgöz =

Leader of the True Path Party
- Incumbent
- Assumed office 28 May 2007
- Preceded by: Position established Mehmet Ağar as the leader of the former True Path Party

Personal details
- Born: 1943 (age 82–83) Istanbul, Turkey
- Party: True Path Party
- Occupation: Lawyer, politician
- Website: Party Biography

Çetin Özaçıkgöz (born 1943) is a Turkish politician and lawyer who currently serves as the leader of the True Path Party (DYP) in Turkey. Özaçıkgöz re-established the DYP in 2007 after the original True Path Party changed its name to Democratic Party (DP).

== Early life and career ==
Özaçıkgöz worked for the Yeni Çığır magazine in 1964 before becoming the President of the Justice Party (AP) youth wing in Bolu Province in 1968. Moving to Ankara in 1969, he worked at the AP headquarters on electoral matters before becoming the head of public relations at the Ministry of Public Works in 1970. He served as the head of public relations for a year until 1971, after which he became the President of the AP Youth Wing until 1974. Between 1975 and 1977, he became an advisor on press and parliamentary affairs to the Ministry of Transport.

In 2000, Özaçıkgöz attended meetings held twice a week at the home of Süleyman Demirel, which focussed on both domestic and international problems faced by Turkey. He also participated in research on political parties, parliaments and local government in Austria, Germany and Switzerland and has written two books. Having served as a practicing lawyer between 1990 and 1999, Özaçıkgöz is still a lawyer in Ankara.

== Re-establishment of the DYP ==
In 2007, the DYP renamed itself and became the Democratic Party in a bid to merge with the Motherland Party (ANAP). Özaçıkgöz subsequently re-established the party on 28 May 2007 along with Mahmut Dayangaç and Cihat Yenidoğan. He was re-elected as the leader of the new DYP in the party's first and second ordinary conventions. Özaçıkgöz subsequently contested the 2011 general election and the June 2015 general election, though his party fell well short of the 10% election threshold needed to win parliamentary representation on both occasions.

== Personal life ==
Özaçıkgöz is married with two children.

== See also ==
- Tansu Çiller
