= Youth Union of Turkey =

Turkish youth organization closely associated with the Patriotic Party

Youth Union of Turkey Türkiye Gençlik Birliği
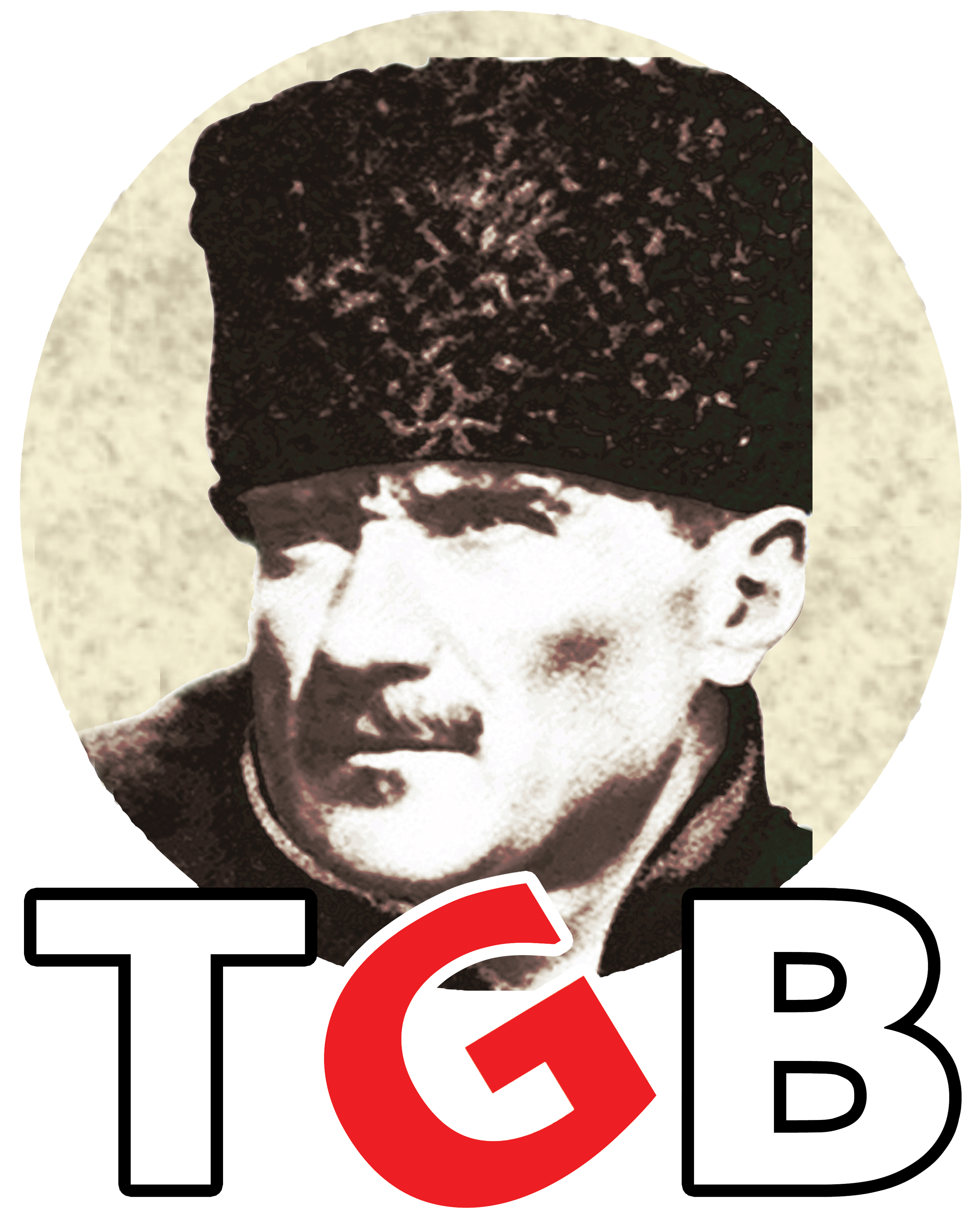
- Chairperson: Kayahan Çetin
- Founded: 19 May 2006
- Headquarters: Istanbul, Turkey
- Ideology: Socialism; Eurasianism; Ulusalcılık; Anti-Americanism; Anti-Westernism; Anti-Zionism
- Website: tgb.gen.tr

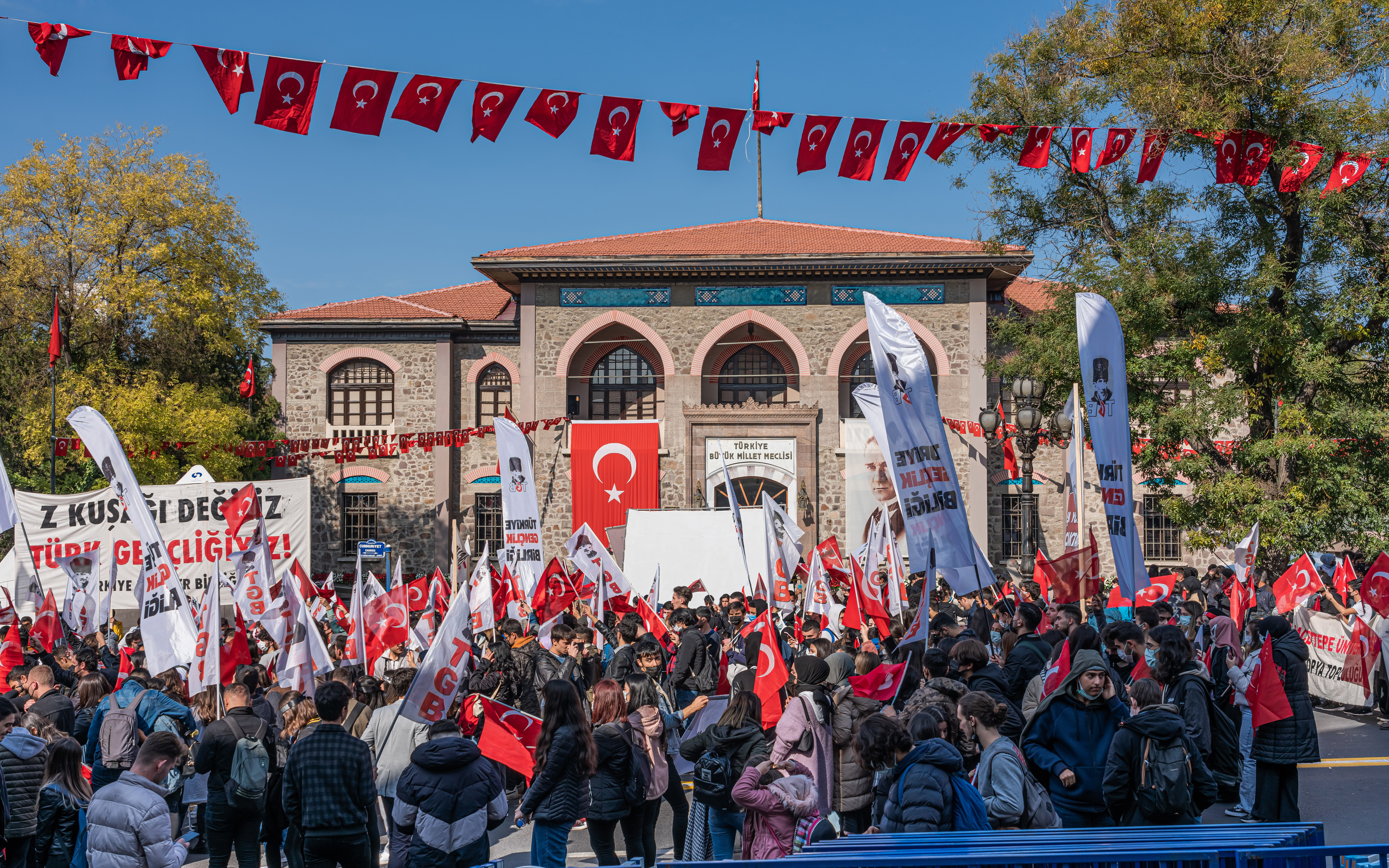
A rally by the TGB on Republic Day 2021, in front of the Republic Museum, Ankara

Youth Union of Turkey (Turkish: Türkiye Gençlik Birliği, TGB) is a Turkish anti-American, anti-Western, anti-Zionist, and Eurasianist revolutionary youth organization closely associated with the Patriotic Party. Founded on 19 May 2006, it comprises 65 student clubs and societies from over 40 Turkish universities.

TGB opposes any future Turkish membership in the European Union and any cooperation with what it calls "American imperialism".

== History ==
In 2011, members of the TGB put white sack over the head of a United States Navy sailor in Bodrum. In 2013, the similar protest was made in İskenderun. They chanted "we do not allow Turkey to become the center of attack on the Middle East".

On November 12, 2014, members of the TGB protested United States Navy sailors from the USS Ross (DDG-71) that were in Istanbul and telling them, in English, "You declare that you are a member of US Army, and now because we define you as murderers, as killers, we want to you, you to, get out of our land." They also chanted "yankee, go home" as they assaulted three sailors and chased them as they fled the scene. The incident was video recorded. The TGB put out a statement saying: "Bags we put over the American soldiers are for the nations of Palestine to Syria." Turkish police later arrested 12 members of the TGB who, in December, were charged for the assault and the Istanbul TGB President Uğur Aytaç said about the violent attack: "proud to be detained for such a reason."

On September 2, 2024, two off-duty United States Marines from the USS Wasp were assaulted by members of the TGB in Izmir. A video of the incident depicted several individuals restraining one of the soldiers and placing a white hood over his head while chanting “Yankee, go home!”

== Protests at the front of McDonald's restaurants ==
In 2008, this group held protests at the front of McDonald's restaurants. They chanted "Palestine is not alone in the crimes against Israel and the United States". McDonald's has over 250 restaurants with 6000 employees in Turkey.

The TGB has opened Attilâ İlhan Cultural Centers in several cities to promote its values among young people. Its centers in Ankara, Istanbul, İzmir, Eskişehir and Afyon are to be followed by new ones in Bursa, Diyarbakır, Eskişehir, Sivas, Muğla, Mersin, Trabzon, Erzurum, Hatay, and Denizli.
