= Turkish Left =

Turkish Left (in Turkish: Türk Solu) was a weekly nationalist and socialist magazine and the official organ of the Turkish Left (in Turkish: Türk Solu) group in Turkey. Türk Solu was formed following a split in the Workers' Party (İP). The magazine was led by Gökçe Fırat Çulhaoğlu and was based in Istanbul.

They consider themselves as nationalist, socialist and Kemalist. They often promote Nationalism, Socialism and Secularism. However, unlike many socialists, they criticise Marx often and they consider Mustafa Kemal Atatürk and Sultan Galiev as ideologues of Turkic Socialism. They are influenced by Attila İlhan, Doğan Avcıoğlu and Şevket Süreyya Aydemir also.

The group published Türk Solu and İleri and founded a political party called Ulusal Parti.

The magazine was closed following the 15 July 2016 coup in Turkey and the magazine founder Gökçe Fırat Çulhaoğlu was arrested.
