= Workers' Fraternity Party =

Workers' Fraternity Party İşçi Kardeşliği Partisi
- Abbreviation: İKP
- Chairman: Mehmet Şadi Ozansü
- Founded: 15 June 2006
- Headquarters: Ankara
- Membership (2017): 0
- Ideology: Democratic socialism Trotskyism; Anti-capitalism; Hard Euroscepticism
- Political position: Far-left

Website
- www.iscikardesligi.org

The Workers' Fraternity Party (Turkish: İşçi Kardeşliği Partisi, İKP) was a democratic socialist political party in Turkey.

The Workers' Fraternity Party was founded in June 2006 and renamed itself as "United Workers' Party of Turkey" (Turkish: Türkiye Birleşik İşçi Partisi, TBİP) in March 2010. In October 2010, the chairman of the TBİP Zeki Kılıçaslan resigned for found People's Voice Party with Islamists politicians. After that, Mehmet Şadi Ozansü was elected as chairman and the United Workers' Party of Turkey changed its name to "Workers' Fraternity Party" again.
