= Crescent Star Party (Turkey) =

Crescent Star Party Ayyıldız Partisi
- Abbreviation: AYP
- Chairperson: Serap Gülhan
- Founded: 3 September 2003
- Headquarters: Ankara
- Membership (2024): 1
- Ideology: Kemalism; Turkish nationalism
- Political position: Centre

Website
- www.ayyildizpartisi.org.tr

The Crescent Star Party (Turkish: Ayyıldız Partisi, AYP) is a Kemalist and nationalist political party in Turkey. It was founded on 3 September 2003. The party's name comes from national symbols crescent and star on Turkish flag.
