= Socialist Liberation Party =

Socialist Liberation Party Toplumcu Kurtuluş Partisi
- Abbreviation: 1920 TKP
- Leader: İsmail Kaplan
- Founded: 7 February 2012
- Preceded by: Ürün
- Headquarters: Ankara
- Membership (2026): ▲117
- Ideology: Communism; Marxism–Leninism
- Political position: Far-left
- Slogan: Bütün ülkelerin işçileri ve ezilen halklar, birleşin! (Workers of all countries and oppressed people, unite!)

Website
- www.TKP.org

The Socialist Liberation Party (Turkish: Toplumcu Kurtuluş Partisi, 1920 TKP) is a Marxist–Leninist communist party in Turkey.

The party was founded as "Toplumcu Kurtuluş Partisi" on 7 February 2012. The party changed its name to "Türkiye Komünist Partisi" on 15 February 2012. The Constitutional Court did not allow the renaming, because there was already a party with the same name, i.e. Türkiye Komünist Partisi. Following that, the party started using the name "Toplumcu Kurtuluş Partisi" again and changed the abbreviation from TKP 1920 to 1920 TKP.

Until 2016, the Socialist Liberation Party was one of the components in the United June Movement, a political coalition initiative which was founded after the Gezi Park revolt.
