= Socialist Republican Party (Turkey) =

Socialist Republican Party Sosyalist Cumhuriyet Partisi
- Abbreviation: SCP
- President: Gurkan Koc
- Chairman: Yılmaz Ersezer
- Founder: İsmail Durna
- Founded: 18 June 2010 (as TİKP); 6 December 2021 (as SCP)
- Split from: Workers' Party
- Headquarters: Ankara, Turkey
- Membership (2026): ▼694
- Ideology: Scientific socialism Maoism; Anti-imperialism; Eurasianism; Kemalism
- Political position: Left-wing
- Colours: Red

Website
- scp.org.tr

Old Logo of the Workers' Peasants' Party of Turkey

The Socialist Republican Party (Turkish: Sosyalist Cumhuriyet Partisi, SCP), formerly known as the Workers' Peasants' Party of Turkey (Turkish: Türkiye İşçi Köylü Partisi, TİKP), is a Maoist scientific socialist political party in Turkey, which was founded on 18 June 2010 and led by İsmail Durna. The SCP advocates national democratic revolution strategy (Turkish: Millî Demokratik Devrim).

== Presidents ==
=== As Worker's Peasants' Party of Turkey ===
Name	Start of Term	End of Term	Time in office
İsmail Durna	18 June 2010	6 December 2021	11 years, 171 days

=== As Socialist Republican Party ===
Name	Start of Term	End of Term	Time in office
Mehmet Bedri Gultekin	6 December 2021	14 February 2023	1 year, 70 days
Yilmaz Ersezer (by proxy)	14 February 2023	26 October 2024	1 year, 255 days
Gurkan Koc	26 October 2024	Ongoing	2 years, 27 days

== See also ==
- List of political parties in Turkey
