= List of Trotskyist organizations by country =

The following is a list of Trotskyist organizations by country. This article lists only those currently existing parties which self-identify ideologically as Trotskyist. Included are Trotskyist factions, but not youth organizations or party alliances.

== List ==
- Algeria – Socialist Workers Party, Workers' Party
- Argentina – Movement for Socialism, Self-determination and Freedom, Socialist Left, Socialist Workers' Party, United Socialist Workers' Party, Workers' Party, Workers' Socialist Movement, Revoluciòn
- Australia – Socialist Alternative, Socialist Equality Party, Solidarity, Spartacist League, Revolutionary Communist international
- Austria – Revolutionäre Kommunistische Partei, Socialist Left Party, Workers Viewpoint
- Azerbaijan – HAQİQAT
- Bangladesh – Communist Party of Bangladesh (Marxist–Leninist) (Section of the Fourth International)
- Belgium – Vonk/Revolution International Workers' League, Left Socialist Party, Anticapitalist Left
- Bolivia – Revolutionary Worker League – Fourth International, Revolutionary Workers Party, Workers' Socialist Movement, Revolutionary Communist international
- Botswana – International Socialist Organization
- Brazil – Centelhas, Ecosocialist Rebellion, Freedom, Socialism and Revolution (LSR), Insurgência, Internationalist Communist Organization, Revolutionary Regroupment, Revolutionary Workers' Party, Socialist Left Movement, Socialist Revolution, Subverta, United Socialist Workers' Party, Workers' Cause Party, Workers' Revolutionary Movement, Workers' Socialist Current
- Canada – Revolutionary Communist Party International Socialists, Socialist Action, Socialist Alternative, Trotskyist League in Quebec and Canada, Marxist Workers Group
  - Quebec – Parti communiste révolutionnaire, Socialist Alternative, Socialist Left
- China – China Worker
  - Hong Kong – Revolutionary Communist Party of China (October Review), Socialist Action
- Chile – Revolutionary Workers Party, Movimiento Anticapitalista, Revolutionary Communist international
- Colombia – Colombia Marxista, Presents for Socialism
- Costa Rica – New Socialist Party, Socialist Organization, Workers' Party
- Cyprus – New Internationalist Left, Workers' Democracy
- Czech Republic – Komunistická Avantgarda, Socialist Solidarity,
- Denmark – Revolutionært Kommunistisk Parti, International Socialists, Socialist Workers Party
- Egypt – Revolutionary Socialists, Revolutionary Communist international
- Finland – Vallankumous, Marxist Workers' League, Socialist Alternative
- France – Révolution Permanente, Independent Workers' Party, New Anticapitalist Party, Revolutionary Left, Trotskyist League of France, Workers' Struggle (See Trotskyism in France)
- Germany – Revolutionäre Kommunistische Partei, Revolutionary Internationalist Organisation, Socialist Equality Party, Socialist Alternative, Workers' Power, Spartakist-Arbeiterpartei
- Ghana – International Socialist Organisation
- Greece – Internationalist Workers' Left, Organisation of Internationalist Communists of Greece, Organization of Communist Internationalists of Greece–Spartacus, Socialist Workers' Party, Start – Socialist Internationalist Organisation, Trotskyist Group of Greece, Workers Revolutionary Party, Epanastasi (Communist Tendency)
- India – Communist Struggle, Radical Socialist, New Socialist Alternative, Workers' Socialist Party
- Indonesia – Revolutionary Communist international, Perhimpunan Sosialis Revolusioner, Angkatan Bolshevik Revolusioner Internasionalis (ABRI)
- Iran – Socialist Workers' Party of Iran
- Ireland – Revolutionary Communists of Ireland, People Before Profit, Solidarity, Socialist Party, Socialist Workers Network
- Italy – Sinistra Anticapitalista, Partito Comunista dei Lavoratori, Partito Comunista Rivoluzionario, Partito di Alternativa Comunista
- Ivory Coast – Militant Côte d'Ivoire
- Japan – Japan Revolutionary Communist League, Spartacist Group Japan, Japan Revolutionary Communist League (Revolutionary Marxist Faction)
- South Korea – Workers' Solidarity, Bolshevik Group, March To Socialism
- Lebanon – Revolutionary Communist Group
- Malaysia – Ombak Revolusi, Socialist Alternative
- Mexico – Organización Comunista Revolucionaria, Socialist Workers Movement
- Netherlands – Socialist Alternative Politics, Socialist Alternative, International Socialists, Revolutionaire Communisten
- New Zealand – Socialist Appeal, International Socialist Organisation, Socialist Aotearoa, Communist Workers Group
- Nicaragua – Workers' Revolutionary Party
- Nigeria – Democratic Socialist Movement, Movement for a Socialist Alternative, Marxist Alternative
- Norway – Internationalist League of Norway, Revolusjon
- Pakistan – Inqalabi Communist Party, Socialist Movement Pakistan, The Struggle Pakistan
- Palestine – Socialist Struggle Movement
- Paraguay – Workers' Party
- Peru – Workers' Revolutionary Party, Socialist Workers Party, Socialist Workers Party (1992), Revolutionary Communist international
- Poland – Workers' Democracy, Czerwony Front
- Portugal – Colectivo Comunista Revolucionario, Socialist Alternative Movement
- Romania – Hand of Labour, The Scientific Communism, Socialist Action Group
- Russia – Revolutionary Workers' Party, Revolutionary Communist international
- South Africa – Revolution, Spartacist South Africa, Workers and Socialist Party, Workers International Vanguard Party, Keep Left, African Peoples' Democratic Union of Southern Africa
- Spain – Organizacion Comunista Revolucionaria, Revolutionary Workers' Party, Internationalist Struggle, Red Current, Workers' Revolutionary Current, Revolutionary Left, Revolutionary Socialism, Anticapitalistas, Internationalist Socialist Workers' Party, Revolutionary Anticapitalist Left
- Sri Lanka – Lanka Sama Samaja Party, Lanka Sama Samaja Party (Alternative Group), Nava Sama Samaja Party, Socialist Party of Sri Lanka, Socialist Equality Party, Revolutionary Workers Party, United Socialist Party
- Sudan – Socialist Alternative
- Sweden – Revolutionära Kommunistiska Partiet, Socialist Party, Socialist Alternative, International Socialists, Workers' Power
- Switzerland – Solidarity, Revolutionäre Kommunistische Partei
- Taiwan – International Socialist Forward, The Spark(ICR Taiwan)
- Thailand – Socialist Workers Thailand
- Togo – Workers' Party
- Tunisia – Socialist Alternative, Workers' Left League
- Turkey – Revolutionary Workers' Party, Revolutionary Socialist Workers' Party, New Way, Socialist Alternative, Workers' Fraternity Party
- Ukraine – Commune, Social Movement, Ukrainian Socialist League
- United Kingdom – Alliance for Workers' Liberty, Communist League, International Socialist League, Workers' Power, Socialist Action, Socialist Appeal, Socialist Equality Party, Socialist Resistance, Socialist Workers' Party, Spartacist League, Workers' Fight, Workers International to Rebuild the Fourth International, Workers Revolutionary Party, Socialist Alternative, Revolutionary Communist Party
  - England and Wales – Socialist Party
  - Scotland – Socialist Party Scotland
- United States – Revolutionary Communists of America (RCI), Socialist Alternative, Socialist Action, Socialist Equality Party, Freedom Socialist Party, Fourth International Caucus, Internationalist Group, Solidarity, Workers' Voice, Socialist Horizon, Speak Out Socialists, Reform and Revolution, Spartacist League, Socialist Workers Organization, Socialist Organizer, The Left Party US, Left Voice, Spark, Revolutionary Workers League, Communist Workers Group
- Uruguay – Workers' Party, International Socialism; Revolutionary Workers' Party, Fourth International Posadist, Current of Workers for Socialism
- Venezuela – Revolutionary Marxist Current, Lucha de Clases, League of Workers for Socialism
- Zimbabwe – International Socialist Organisation

== See also ==
- List of anti-capitalist and communist parties with national parliamentary representation
- List of communist parties
- List of communist parties in India
- List of communist parties represented in European Parliament
- List of democratic socialist parties and organizations
- List of democratic socialist parties that have governed
- List of Labour parties
- List of left and far-left parties in Europe
- List of left-wing political parties
- List of members of the Comintern
