= International Socialists =

International Socialists may refer to:

== Organizations ==
=== Organizations affiliated with the International Socialist Tendency ===
- International Socialist Organization, an American Trotskyist group from 1976 to 2019 which was expelled from the International Socialist Tendency in 2001
- International Socialists (Australia), an Australian Trotskyist group
- International Socialists (Brazil)
- International Socialists (Canada), a Canadian Trotskyist group formed in the 1970s
- International Socialists (Denmark), a Danish Trotskyist group formed in 1984
- International Socialists (Ireland), a defunct Irish Trotskyist group
- International Socialists (Netherlands), a Dutch Trotskyist group formed in 1988
- International Socialists (Norway), a Norwegian Trotskyist group from the 1980s to 2008
- International Socialists (UK), now known as the Socialist Workers Party, a British Trotskyist group

=== Other Trotskyist organizations ===
- International Socialist Group, a British section of the reunified Fourth International from 1987 to 2009
- International Socialist Movement, a current within the Scottish Socialist Party from 2001 to 2006
- International Socialists (Scotland), a Scottish organization affiliated with the Committee for a Workers' International
- International Socialists (United States), an American organization from the 1960s to 1986

=== Other organizations ===
- International Socialist League, a South African communist party from 1915 to 1921
- International Socialist Party, now known as the Communist Party of Argentina, an Argentinian communist party formed in 1918
- International Socialists of Germany, a German left communist party in the 1910s

== Other ==
- International socialism, the perception of all communist revolutions being part of a single global class struggle

== See also ==
- International Socialist Alternative, an international association of Trotskyist parties
- International Socialist Alternative (Austria), the Austrian section of International Socialist Alternative, formed in 2000
- International Socialist Circle, an Argentinian anarchist organization from 1879 to 1901
- International Socialist Group (disambiguation)
- International Socialist Left, a German Trotskyist organization active until 2016
- International Socialist Movement (South Africa), a South African Trotskyist organization formed in 1989
- International Socialist Network, a British socialist organization from 2013 to 2015
- International Socialist Opposition, a faction of the British International Socialists in the 1970s
- International Socialist Organization (disambiguation)
- International Socialist Party of Subcarpathian Rus', a Czechoslovak communist party from 1920 to 1921
- List of left-wing internationals
