= International Socialist Organization (disambiguation) =

The International Socialist Organization was a Trotskyist group in the United States.

International Socialist Organization also may refer to:

- International Socialist Organisation (Australia)
- International Socialist Organization (Botswana)
- International Socialist Organisation (Germany)
- International Socialist Organisation (Ghana)
- International Socialist Organisation (New Zealand)
- International Socialist Organization (Zimbabwe)

== See also ==
- International Socialists (disambiguation)
