= Workers' Democracy =

Workers' Democracy may refer to:

- Workers' Democracy (Cyprus)
- Workers' Democracy (Poland)
