= Socialism from below (organization) =

French socialist group from 1997 to 2007

Socialism from below (Socialisme par en bas, SPEB), founded in 1997 and disbanded in 2007, was one of two socialist groups in France based on the International Socialism tradition of the Trotskyist movement. It was affiliated to the International Socialist Tendency led by the Socialist Workers Party (SWP) in Britain.

== History ==
Its origins lay in a small group of former members of Lutte Ouvriere who left that group in 1974 expecting to join a larger group, Union Ouvrier, which had broken from LO the previous year. They found that UO had already disintegrated, its members going in many directions. Therefore, they formed a group of their own, initially named Combat Communiste.

Some members of Combat Communiste were won over to the positions of the International Socialists (IS, forerunner of the SWP) and sought to win other militants to their views before launching an independent group of their own. They joined the Ligue Communiste Revolutionnaire (LCR) to further that aim and later left to found the Socialisme International group.

During the 1990s, Tony Cliff, leading theoretician in the British Socialist Workers Party encouraged Socialisme International to follow the successful example of Linksruck (which entered the youth section of the German Social Democratic Party (SPD) and grew substantially) and join the French Socialist Party. This caused a split, with some members founding a small group called Socialisme, some leaving entirely, and the remainder renaming themselves Socialisme Par En Bas. In the event the tactic was disastrous and SPEB left the Socialist Party again shortly afterwards.

SPEB grew somewhat during the radicalisation in France in the late 1990s around the anti-capitalist movement, but was still too small to take full advantage. It joined ATTAC en masse, but when the latter began to lose the initiative and stall in the aftermath of 9/11, it started to concentrate its efforts on building Agir Contre La Guerre (Act Against the War). Following the relatively good showing for the far left in the French presidential elections in 2002, SPEB advocated the 'unity of the revolutionary left', and applied to join the LCR as an official faction. This move was supported by the British SWP, which at that time was starting to develop closer relations with the LCR.

In late January 2004 SPEB, then numbering approximately 50 militants, was permitted to join the LCR as a faction. Socialisme International (the Socialisme group renamed), by then much smaller, had joined the LCR some months previously. SPEB disbanded in early 2007.
