= Anticapitalist Party =

The Anticapitalist Party (Turkish: Antikapitalist Parti) was a Trotskyist organisation in Turkey. It was part of the International Socialist Tendency led by the Socialist Workers Party (UK).

The antecedents of Antikapitalist can be traced back to 1982 when the origins of the Sosyalist İşçi (today's Revolutionary Socialist Workers' Party) were formed.

After founding of the Revolutionary Socialist Workers' Party in 1997, internal problems emerged and led to a split in the new party in 1998 and a group named İşçi Demokrasisi (Workers Democracy) (İD) left the group. The leaderships of the British and Greek SWPs supported different sides in this dispute. Some time later some members of İD left to form Antikapitalist. Some small groups left the group; the members left in Antikapitalist was small and unable to organize. The group was abolished in 2010.

The few last members of Antikapitalist joined the Equality and Democracy Party (Eşitlik ve Demokrasi Partisi, EDP).
