= Stop the Boats – The Lie of Saving Lives at Sea =

Documentary film

- Directed by: Nicolai Jung
- Produced by: Phil Miller; Nicolai Jung
- Cinematography: Nicolai Jung
- Release date: 2017
- Running time: 56 minutes
- Countries: Germany; United Kingdom
- Language: English

Stop the Boats – The Lie of Saving Lives at Sea is a 2017 documentary film about Operation Sovereign Borders the policy of the government of Australia to stop any refugees reaching Australian territory by boat.

The film documents the journey of the boat the Andika in May 2015 – which the boat crew and passengers state were on a journey to New Zealand rather than Australia —but were intercepted by Australian forces and forcibly sent back to Indonesia.

== Synopsis ==
The documentary film begins in West Kupang where the refugees from the boat the Andika are being held in immigration detention. The film then discusses their journey from Indonesia around the waters of Australia where they are intercepted by the Australian navy, forced onto two smaller boats and sent back to Indonesia, which including the apparent payment to the boat's crew by the Australians of tens of thousands of dollars cash. The payment and treatment of the boat is subject to scrutiny from a number of Australian politicians in the Australian parliament. The film also interviews a number of people from New Zealand – the boats intended destination – where the film ends.

== Production ==
The film was shot in West Timor (the Indonesian part of Timor), Australia, New Zealand, Germany and the United Kingdom. It features interviews of the Andika refugees, local villagers in Indonesia who rescued the refugees after they were sent back by Australia, and refugee advocates in Australia and New Zealand. It also features footage of the interception by Australian forces captured by the refugees on mobile phones, as well as footage from the Australian parliament when officials of Operation Sovereign Borders are questioned by parliamentarians about the Andika interception.

== Interviewees ==
- John Pilger
- Ian Rintoul
- Antony Loewenstein
- Deborah Manning
- Bruce Haigh

== Release ==
The film premiered at the Nuremberg International Human Rights Film Festival in October 2017. It was also screened at special event by Medico International on 14 November 2017 and Sea-Watch on 7 November 2017. It was selected to be screened as part of the film program at the Marxism 2019 conference in Melbourne Australia.

== Press coverage ==
The film makers work was covered on New Zealand's major television channels Television New Zealand – One News and TV3 – Newshub. The interception and film was discussed in an article in The Spinoff.
