= Socialist Organisation of Working People =

Czech political group

The Socialist Organisation of Working People (SOP, Czech: Socialistická organizace pracujících) was a Trotskyist political group in the Czech Republic established in 1998 after a split in the group affiliated to the International Socialist Tendency, Socialist Solidarity. It is a section of the League for the Fifth International.

In their words: "SOP follows revolutionary traditions of Marx, Engels, Lenin and Trotsky, striving to build a revolutionary worker's party". They established an independent youth group, called REVO, in 2000. Revo had a split in 2006.
