= Workers Organisation for Socialist Action =

- Abbreviation: WOSA
- Chairman: Neville Alexander
- Founded: April 14, 1990
- Ideology: Trotskyism; Socialism
- Slogan: "Jobs, peace and socialism. No compromise!"

The Workers Organisation for Socialist Action (WOSA) was a Trotskyist organisation in South Africa. Launched in April 1990 as a national organisation, the WOSA was opposed to racism, tribalism and sexism and supports socialism, accountability, democracy and the leadership of the black working class.

The group was formed by a need for an organization that could raise workers issues without being aligned to any political party and has dealt with working conditions, wages, unemployment, housing, education, health and transport. It also claimed that the African National Congress was raising hopes which were unrealisable under capitalism. Instead, for the 1994 South African general election, it formed the Workers List Party in alliance with the International Socialist Movement (South Africa) (ISM), which shared much of the politics of (but was not affiliated to) the International Socialist Tendency. The aim was to build a mass workers' party. The group took only 4,169 votes, and the Workers List was soon abandoned.

The organisation, chaired by Neville Alexander, soon formed links with Workers Liberty, but following a disillusionment after the poor election result, its membership declined and it changed direction. In 1997, it hosted a conference with the Italian group Socialismo Rivoluzionario, also attended by Lalit from Mauritius and the International Bolshevik Tendency. It was close to the United Secretariat of the Fourth International and published Vukani Basebenzi and Workers' Voice.
