= Socialist Worker =

Name of several newspapers

- Type: Weekly newspaper
- Format: Tabloid
- Editor: Charlie Kimber
- Founded: 1968
- Political alignment: Trotskyist
- Headquarters: London
- Website: socialistworker.co.uk

The raised fist in red is the symbol of the International Socialist Tendency and the International Socialist Organization.

Socialist Worker is the name of several newspapers currently or formerly associated with the International Socialist Tendency (IST). It is a weekly newspaper published by the Socialist Workers Party (SWP) in the United Kingdom since 1968, and a monthly published by the International Socialists in Canada. It was a monthly (and daily web site) published by the International Socialist Organization (ISO) in the United States from 1977 to 2019, and a biweekly published by the Socialist Workers Party in Ireland, a quarterly published by the International Socialist Organisation in Zimbabwe, a bi-monthly published by the Socialist Workers League in Nigeria, and a monthly published by the former International Socialist Organisation in Australia.

== United Kingdom ==
Although Socialist Worker sales/circulation data is not publicly available, John Molyneux estimated the circulation of the paper in 2006 to be under 8,000. Special "bumper" issues have a circulation approaching 10,000 it was claimed in an article containing an interview with Judith Orr in April 2013.

=== History ===
Originally titled Industrial Worker, and then Labour Worker, it was founded by the Socialist Review Group (which became the International Socialists, then the SWP) in 1961 in London (Cliff 78).

The newspaper was renamed Socialist Worker in 1968 and moved to weekly production; its first editor was Roger Protz (Higgins 90). Its language and general approach was modelled on The Daily Mirror but aimed to provide a very different set of ideas. In the early 1970s at a time of class struggle in Britain, the print order rose from 13,000 in 1970 to 28,000 during the miners strike of 1972, and had stabilised at about 27,000 in March 1973. It then rose again at the end of that year, reaching 40,000 during the 1974 miners' strike and even touching 53,000 for one issue before the crucial 1974 election. Writers included Paul Foot, Duncan Hallas and Eamonn McCann plus reports of strikes and other struggles from across the country sent in by readers. The editor from 1974 to 1978, Paul Foot (Foot xii) later went to work for the Mirror, though he continued to contribute to Socialist Worker until his death in 2004. It was first edited between 1976–77 and then again between 1982 and 2004 by Chris Harman.

After 2004 it was edited by Chris Bambery, who was succeeded by Charlie Kimber in 2009, and Judith Orr late in 2010. When Margaret Thatcher died, the newspaper printed "Rejoice" over her headstone, gaining much international comment.

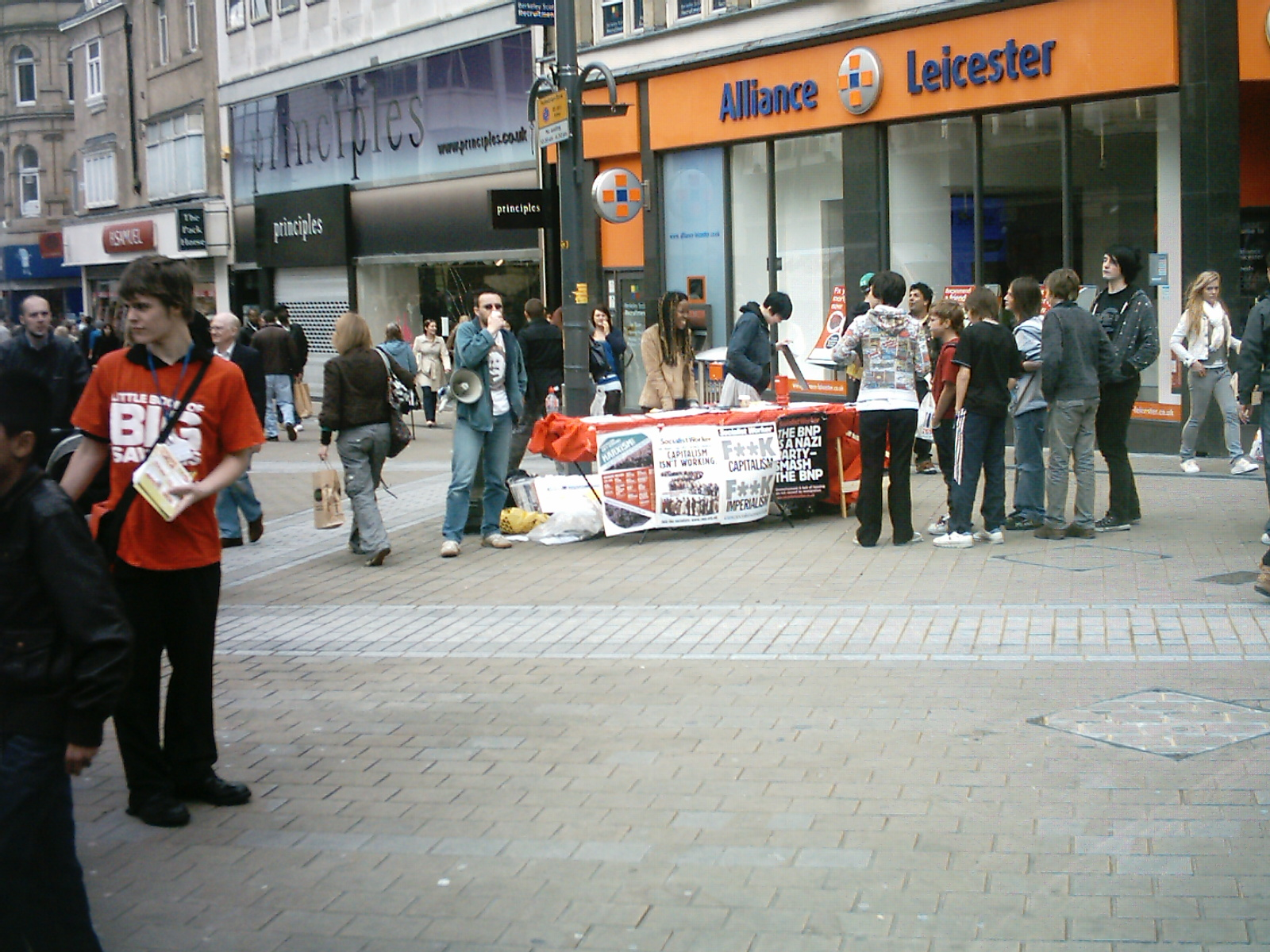
The Socialist Worker being sold on Briggate in Leeds in 2009

The paper gained mainstream attention for itself when it published an article which seemed to mock the death of a 17-year-old who was mauled to death by a polar bear, on the basis that he was attending Eton. Writing in The Guardian, Owen Jones commented that instead of expressing sadness or empathy over the death of a young person, the newspaper was "evidently delighted." Jones said the end of the article "was even more gratuitous," because it said "Now we have another reason to save the polar bears." Jones suggested that "the official organ of the Socialist Workers party (SWP) apparently fantasises about an army of polar bears leaving the playing fields of Eton soaked blue with posh blood."

Working for the newspaper has proven to be an apprenticeship for many prominent journalists at the onset of their careers, including Gary Bushell and the brothers Christopher and Peter Hitchens.

=== Production and distribution ===
The paper is published on behalf of the party by Larkham Printers & Publishers Limited, having previously been published by Sherborne Publications Limited.

== United States ==
Socialist Worker
- Type: Monthly newspaper
- Format: Tabloid
- Founded: 1977
- Ceased publication: 2019
- Political alignment: Socialist; Trotskyist
- Website: socialistworker.org

Shortly after its foundation in 1977, the ISO began publishing a monthly titled Socialist Worker, modelled after the British publication of the same name and the biweekly Workers' Power, then published by the International Socialists. The paper became a daily web site on May Day 2008. The print version was published monthly. The ISO left the International Socialist Tendency in 2001.

Since 13 April 2001, the ISO also published a Spanish language supplement to Socialist Worker, titled Obrero Socialista. Publication was irregular until 2005, since when it has been bimonthly.

The ISO, and with it Socialist Worker, was dissolved in April 2019 in the wake of a sexual scandal.

== Canada ==
Socialist Worker
- Type: Monthly (fortnightly from 1995 to 2006) newspaper
- Format: Tabloid
- Founded: 1968 (as Workers' Action)
- Political alignment: Socialist; Trotskyist
- Headquarters: Toronto
- Website: www.socialist.ca

Socialist Worker is the publication of the International Socialists, the Canadian IST affiliate. The newspaper was originally called Workers' Action and was published monthly from 1975 until 1985. After 108 issues, it was renamed Socialist Worker. More recently, the newspaper has been published sporadically. It was published triweekly for a short period in 1995 and is currently on a monthly schedule.

Socialist Worker is twelve pages and printed in black and red. A French-language monthly, Résistance!, was also published by the IS and claimed a circulation of 300, most of it in Quebec. It has now ceased publication. The Agitator, a monthly student bulletin was published from 2007 to 2009.

== Other countries ==
The Irish SWP's fortnightly Socialist Worker styles itself as a "paper of the movements".

Similar publications with the same title were formerly published in Australia and New Zealand. The Australian International Socialist Organisation's paper sales dwindled to 422 an issue by 2000. By 2001, when the paper went weekly, sales had dropped by almost 300. The paper ended with the merger of the ISO and two other socialist groups which formed Solidarity in 2008.

== See also ==
- List of left-wing publications in the United Kingdom
