= Anti-Privatisation Forum =

South African social movement

The Anti-Privatisation Forum (APF) was established in Johannesburg in July 2000 by activists and organisations involved in two key anti-privatisation struggles: the struggle against iGoli 2002, and the struggle against Wits 2001 at Wits University. The APF had affiliates from the unions, communities, students and the left: while most affiliates were township-based community movements, it also included small leftwing political groups, like Keep Left and the anarchist Bikisha Media Collective (later part of the Zabalaza Anarchist Communist Front).

For ten years the APF was a vibrant social movement in Gauteng townships, including areas on the East Rand and in Soweto and Orange Farm. It is now defunct.

== Views ==
The APF had fairly detailed positions on a wide range of issues, and was self-described as 'anti-capitalist.' However, its focus was on struggles, and in practice, affiliate organisations and individuals could take a wide range of positions. Many ordinary members were interested primarily in fighting against immediate problems, such as evictions and cut-offs, and did not take hard political positions.

Others, however, were influenced by left-wing ideas, including Marxism–Leninism in the Socialist Party of Azania tradition, Trotskyism in various forms, and anarchist communism. There was also a small autonomist current, based largely among university intellectuals.

Trevor Ngwane, one of the founding members, and a former town councillor was the APF's best known figure: his politics were orthodox Trotskyism.

== Repression ==
The movement suffered significant state repression, largely directed at protestors from APF community-based affiliates.
