= Revolutionary Socialist Workers' Party (Turkey) =

Revolutionary Socialist Workers' Party Devrimci Sosyalist İşçi Partisi
- Abbreviation: DSİP
- Co-spokespersons: Tuna Emren; Şenol Karakaş
- Founder: Şevket Doğan Tarkan
- Founded: 27 April 1997
- Membership (2026): ▼70
- Ideology: Third camp Anti-capitalism; Anti-Kemalism; Trotskyism
- Political position: Far-left
- National affiliation: Peoples' Democratic Congress
- International affiliation: International Socialist Tendency

The Revolutionary Socialist Workers' Party (Turkish: Devrimci Sosyalist İşçi Partisi, DSİP) is a Trotskyist party in Turkey. It was founded by Şevket Doğan Tarkan and his friends from Trotskyist journal Socialist Worker in 1997. The group had links to far-left Kurtuluş Hareketi (Liberation Movement) before the 1980 Turkish coup d'état.

An opposition grouping within DSİP named Antikapitalist was formed following a split in DSİP. The group had no relation with DSİP after that split.

The party did not participate in elections in Turkey but supported left-wing electoral alliances. At the 2007 elections, they declared support for the independent candidates of Democratic Society Party. The party voted "yes" in the 2010 Turkish constitutional referendum as part of the Yetmez Ama Evet ("Not Enough but Yes") campaign.

The DSİP is the Turkish section of the International Socialist Tendency. The DSİP supports the political magazine Altüst.

The party is one of the participants in the Peoples' Democratic Congress, a political initiative instrumental in founding the Peoples' Democratic Party in 2012.

Lawyer Mücteba Kılıç, a member of the DSİP who was once on the agenda with the Young Civilians Initiative, was detained within the scope of the 'FETÖ' operation in 2016.
