= Trevor Ngwane =

South African socialist & anti-apartheid activist (born 1960)

Trevor Ngwane is a South African socialist, anti-apartheid activist, and author. He previously worked as a sociology lecturer at Wits University where he helped found the Wits Workers' School, to teach literacy to the campus cleaners and gardeners.

== Personal life ==
Ngwane was born in Durban in 1960 to two medical nurses. For some time, he and his brother were sent to a Catholic boarding school near Durban, although they were expelled for participating in a spontaneous school strike after the Soweto uprising in 1976.

In 1979, Ngwane enrolled at the University of Fort Hare, where he studied sociology. He was expelled in 1982 for participating in student strikes, and rather than choosing to reapply at the university, moved to Soweto. Here, he continued his sociology degree through the University of South Africa, and later began a master's degree at the University of the Witwatersrand (Wits). It was while working as a tutor and junior lecturer at Wits that Ngwane says he became a Marxist.

== Career ==
=== Political career ===
Ngwane was the National Education Officer for the Transport & General Workers Union of the Congress of South African Trade Unions from 1991 to 1993. In 1995 he was elected Ward Councillor for Pimville Zone 5 and 7, Soweto, on an African National Congress ticket. In 1999 he was expelled by the ANC for opposing the City of Johannesburg Metropolitan Municipality's privatization of municipal services. In 2001, he helped found the Soweto Electricity Crisis Committee and then the Anti-Privatisation Forum in 2002, which both campaign against the privatisation of public services. He is a member of the Socialist Group.

=== Academic career ===
In 2011, Ngwane obtained a Master of Arts (MA) degree in developmental studies at the University of KwaZulu-Natal in Durban. In 2016, he obtained a Doctorate of Philosophy (PhD) from the University of Johannesburg, for which he wrote a thesis titled 'Amakomiti' as 'Democracy on the Margins': Popular Committees in South Africa's Informal Settlements. This was later adapted into the book Amakomiti: Grassroots Democracy in South African Shack Settlements, which was published by Jacana Media in 2021.

As its name suggests, Amakomiti explores the role of "amakomiti" (committees) in informal settlements in South Africa. Ngwane describes these amakomiti as a form of "democracy on the margins", and discusses how they function as such, as well as how they interact with more formal political structures. The book is based on research conducted in 46 shack settlements. Four of these are also used to present in-depth case studies of amakomiti.

He currently teaches at the University of Johannesburg.

== Selected articles ==
- The Urban Crisis Is A Crisis of Capitalist Democracy (and the Struggle to Remove Its Chains), Amandla Magazine, 17 June 2019.
- South Africa in 2010: A History That Must Happen, Socialist Project, 11 November 2010.
- Socialists, the Environment and Ecosocialism, MRZine, 20 November 2009.
- Letter from South Africa, Socialist Review, September, 2009.
