= Internationalist Workers' Left =

Internationalist Workers' Left Διεθνιστική Εργατική Αριστερά
- Leader: Elected Central Committee
- Founded: 3 March 2001
- Split from: Socialist Workers' Party
- Headquarters: Athens, Greece
- Newspaper: Ergatiki Aristera (Workers' Left); Diethnistiki Aristera (International Left)
- Ideology: Revolutionary socialism Marxism; Trotskyism
- Political position: Far-left
- Colours: Red

Website
- dea.org.gr

The Internationalist Workers' Left (Greek: Διεθνιστική Εργατική Αριστερά, ΔΕΑ; DEA) is a Trotskyist organization in Greece. It was founded in 2001 after splitting from the Socialist Workers' Party-International Socialist Tendency (SEK-IST). The organization was particularly active in the Greek Social Forum and the Coalition of the Radical Left. It maintains a sisterhood relationship with the International Socialist Organization (ISO) in the United States. Through the ISO, the DEA has developed connections with both the Socialist Alternative in Australia and the Movement for Socialism in Switzerland.

== Foundation and early activity ==
The Internationalist Workers' Left was founded on 3 March 2001, after having split from the Socialist Workers' Party (SEK) – the Greek section of the International Socialist Tendency – earlier that year. At the time, SEK announced that "A small group had departed" from the party. The DEA, however, reported that the majority of Athenian members had joined the opposition. According to the DEA, the split was the result of differences in the direction of the party, including the concept of a propagandist "fortress party" as well as the role and tactics of revolutionary organizations in the Anti-globalization movement. The DEA refers to the principles of the International Socialists and the Organization Socialist Revolution (OSE), the predecessor of the SEK.

During the organization's founding conference, the Socialistis Erghatis, a group from Thessaloniki that had left the OSE during the early 1990s, joined the DEA. A group around the politically left magazine Manifesto also joined during the founding conference, only to leave with the founding of Kokkino three years later.

Resulting from the split was a lack of credibility within the Greek Left. One example was the lack of collaboration with the Youth of Synaspismós during the 2000 Anti-globalization demonstrations in Prague, causing a lack of credibility towards SEK by the members of Synaspismós.

From its foundation, the DEA engaged in the organization of various political movements, beginning with the international demonstration against the G8 summit at Genoa in 2001. The DEA's initiative, called the Greek Committee for the International Demonstration of Genoa, went on to be endorsed by other groups of the Left in Greece, such as the Youth of Synaspismós, Xekinima and A/synechia (later the Communist Organization of Greece), as well as other members of the Space for Dialogue for the Unity and Common Action of the Left. This initiative later took the form of the International Action initiative, which went on to organize the Greek movement participation in the first European Social Forum (ESF) held in Florence, Italy, in 2002.

=== Greek Social Forum ===
The success of the first European Social Forum, as well as the scheduled assumption of the European Union's presidency by Greece in 2003, facilitated the transformation of the International Action initiative into the Greek Social Forum (GSF). The GSF was the major organizer of the protests against all summits of EU ministers held in Greece during the six-month "Greek presidency", including a rally in Salonica during the EU leaders' summit in June 2003. However, the GSF's major impact in Greece was the organization of the 2003 demonstrations against the war in Iraq, which brought together hundreds of thousands of protesters, especially during February and March 2003.

The DEA continues to participate in the Greek Social Forum today. One of the greatest successes of the Forum was the co-organization of the 4th European Social Forum in Athens in May 2006, which included a demonstration including over 90,000 participants. However, the Greek Social Forum has seen a decline in recent years, mostly the result of the downplay of the GSF by Synaspismós.

== Electoral activity ==
The DEA participated in the Greek legislative elections of 2004 in cooperation with Synaspismós (SYN) and other parties of the Greek Left, under the umbrella of the Coalition of the Radical Left (SYRIZA). The organization joined the alliance under the conditions described as the "Four No", which advocate against war, racism, neoliberalism, and center-leftism. These terms, set in 2004, served as a starting set of principles for a collaboration and have been updated in over the years. During the electoral campaign, the DEA defended the organization's right to use its own leaflets, posters and newspapers, as well as the alliance's. This set a precedent for elections to come, and for other Greek Left organizations that would later join the organization.

The DEA did not participate in the 2004 European Parliament elections due to the violation of the coalition's principles by SYN leadership. The latter turned once again to center-left politics, through the SYN's president's engagement in a discussion for his election as President of Greece – a move that discredited both himself as well as the center-left politics under SYN's membership.

The DEA participated again in the Greek legislative elections of 2007 with SYRIZA in the European elections of 2009, where SYRIZA received 5.04% of the vote. Meanwhile, the KOE joined the SYRIZA coalition in 2007, followed by Xekinima in 2008.

=== 2004 crisis ===
DEA came into a crisis a short time before the 2004 European Parliament elections, when two different groups chose to leave the organization. One formed the political group Kokkino, while the other formed a smaller group, named the Internationalist Socialist Intervention (DSP), which soon thereafter joined the Organization of Communist Internationalists of Greece-Spartacus (OKDE-Spartakos), the Greek Section of the Reunified Fourth International.

In the DSP's point of view, the dispute was over the decision as to whether or not to enter the SYRIZA coalition. Key arguments were based on the reformists' lack of credibility and the relatively small size of the DEA, which they feared would not allow the revolutionaries to intervene in the course of the coalition.

On the other hand, in Kokkino's view, the argument was over participating in SYRIZA without the "written" denunciation of center-leftism. Moreover, this was combined with minimizing the DEA's organizational structures and differences within the SYRIZA coalition, as well as the broader movement as a whole. This tactic was based on the estimation of the "permanent defeat" of center-left politics within the Greek Left, as well as the European Left as a whole. In 2009, Kokkino would split, with a small group arguing over the failure of the organization's political estimations and strategy towards SYN, as well as its poor organizational methods. The new group, the Anti-capitalist Political Group (APO), later became a part of the Overthrow and Solidarity Front, along with the DEA and other forces from within SYRIZA.

== Affiliation with SYRIZA ==
=== Student movement, 2007–2008 ===
SYRIZA played a significant role in the movement for public university education in Greece. This was done primarily through the group's movement for the defense of article 16 of the Greek Constitution, which advocates only public education, during the Greek constitutional reform of 2007. This policy gave the coalition a unique dynamic, giving it an estimated 18% of the vote in polls during 2007 and 2008.

The party of the SYN interpreted this success as a "demand" for a "responsible opposition" and for a "governmental program" – most of which was "realistic" measures (according to the tradition of Eurocommunism) or even "alternative, realistic bill proposals". This damaged SYRIZA's image, since it gave the signal of a return to center-left politics. The DEA questioned this tactic and counterposed the need for emphasis on the support of social struggles.

=== December 2008 riots ===
A major landmark in the history of SYRIZA was the December revolt of 2008. SYRIZA became the target of many right-wing parties in Greece after it supported riots following the death of a 16-year-old student by the police. Resulting from this move was targeting by the New Democracy Party, the Popular Orthodox Rally, PASOK and the Communist Party of Greece. Although this move resulted in SYRIZA's decline in polls, among the youth and workers, it "cleared" the party from SYN's previous history of center-leftism.

=== Re-engagement of left-wing activists ===
During 2007 and 2008, SYRIZA became an inspiration for many disappointed and demobilized activists on the Left, who now approached the coalition in numbers. This fact was the basis for a discussion to make SYRIZA's position more moderate, including giving rights and obligations to members that are not affiliated with any of the allied organizations. In order to address this issue, SYRIZA established meetings with all of its affiliates throughout Greece. As a result, in recent years, local, peripheral and central-level party structures have been established within SYRIZA. Some unaffiliated organizations, including AKOA, argued that the coalition should remain a unified party and blamed the lack of support in SYRIZA on the fact that too many sub-party organizations existed. Meanwhile, Alekos Alavanos was succeeded in SYN's leadership by Alexis Tsipras, while Alavanos remained parliamentary chairman of SYRIZA.

=== Leadership conflict within SYRIZA ===
Shortly after the 2009 European Parliamentary elections, SYN's two main leadership figures – Alekos Alavanos and Alexis Tsipras – fell into conflict. Although it was a widely discussed conflict, the real reasons behind it were not uncovered. The DEA refused to take sides on the issue, especially since neither leader offered any political arguments on the matter.

The DEA participated with SYRIZA in the legislative elections of 2009, which brought the centre-left PASOK to power. After the elections, SYN's leadership turned to the so-called "programmatic opposition", which claimed to "separate the positive and progressive from the negative and neo-Liberal policies of PASOK". To the DEA, this was seen as a method of "giving time" for the new government to adjust, and not preparing the movement for future attacks. In the DEA's view, this meant supporting some government bills which they deemed "progressive". Similar arguments were also made by the KOE and SYRIZA's parliamentary chairman, Alekos Alavanos, as well as some unaffiliated members of SYRIZA.

=== Formation of the Solidarity and Overthrow Front ===
In January 2010, disillusionment with the SYN led to the formation of the Solidarity and Overthrow Front (MMA) by the KOE. According to the DEA, the MAA has made an effort to counterbalance the SYN's turn towards more moderate policies in order to protect and develop the left-wing policies of SYRIZA. First, the MMA rejected the SYN's "Stability Pact", as an "Austerity Pact", as well as the EU Stability Memorandum. The organization also adopted the "Workers' December" as a party slogan, which referred to the attitude of SYRIZA during the 2008 Greek riots.

The SYN accused the MAA of trying to split SYRIZA, as well as advocating "ultraleftism" and "national-centrism". In the following months, the dispute escalated, resulting in a split in the prefectural elections in Attica in November 2010.

==== Greek prefectural and municipal elections, 2010 ====
The prefectural elections and municipal elections of 2010 were preceded by Greece's appeal to the International Monetary Fund and six general strikes during 2010. These developments gave the peripheral elections the character of a "poll against or for the government policy". The SYN chose to endorse a candidate of SYRIZA for the Attica region, a cadre of PASOK, who clearly voiced his rejection of PASOK policy, yet had no intentions of overthrowing the government. The leadership of the SYN saw this as a "chance to appeal to the voters of PASOK", while "pouring water in the SYN's and SYRIZA's wine". This violation of SYRIZA's policy was rejected by the forces of the MAA. When A. Mitropoulos was announced as the SYN's candidate, the MAA announced its separate participation in the Attica prefecture elections, endorsing Alekos Alavanos as their candidate. This "tacticism" by the SYN's leadership was criticized by the "Left Current" tendency of the party, as well by the party's youth organization, although they did not openly vote down the official candidate for the elections.

The electoral results in the prefecture of Attica were a stalemate for the two separate ballots of SYRIZA. Alavanos was elected to the prefectural council by a very small margin and claimed personal responsibility for the low voter turnout. A. Mitropolulos' ballot managed to elect three representatives to the council, none of whom, however, were members of the SYN. Moreover, the result is believed to show a large disapproval of A. Mitropoulos' candidacy among voters in support of the Greek Left.

=== 2012 national election ===
DEA took part in the 2012 national election with SYRIZA, as did KOE, and a part of unaffiliated members of MAA. As a result of the successive elections of May 6 and June 17, two members of DEA got elected to the Greek parliament. Maria Bolari and Ioanna Gaitani are among the 72-strong parliamentary group of SYRIZA.

=== SYRIZA Conference 2012 ===
In order to deal with the new situation, SYRIZA decided to hold a Conference in early December. DEA had about one hundred delegates elected (an unexpected 3,5% of the 3,200 total delegates). As part of the Left Platform List (coalition within the Conference between DEA, Left Current, Kokkino organization, Anticapitalist Political Organization and unaffiliated members of SYRIZA), DEA had nine members elected in the new Central Committee of SYRIZA, as well as three more DEA members that were appointed "by right" as the organization's representatives (out of a total of 315 members of the Central Committee).

=== R-Project: Moves to organise an opposition in SYRIZA ===
During 2012, in order to counterpose the "realistic" turn and "eurozone at all costs" line within SYRIZA, while keeping distance from Left Current's position of a "Grexit", DEA has joined forces with the majority of Kokkino and the Anticapitalist Political Organization to form an "anticapitalist, internationalist network" within SYRIZA. The aim has been to set a distinct Pole within SYRIZA that will work as a political and organizational center for a radical policy of SYRIZA. As part of this effort, a website has been developed under the name "the R-Project".

As part of this effort, "the R-Project" organized an international meeting of the anticapitalist left, from the 1st to 3 March 2013. Among the invited speakers were Olivier Besancenot and Francois Sabado of the French NPA, Ahmed Shawki of the ISO USA, and other international figures of the international left.

=== Leaving SYRIZA ===
After the August split in SYRIZA, in which 25 lawmakers left to form Popular Unity (LAE), the DEA supported the LE and became a member of that party, remaining a member until February 2020.

== Current activity ==
Ergatiki Aristera is the DEA's official newspaper, and is published biweekly.

=== Anti-racist and immigrant movements ===
The DEA has several immigrants in its membership and is well-established in the anti-racist movement through the initiatives of "Sunday Immigrants' School" and the Deport Racism Organization. The main characteristic of the Deport Racism Organization is the idea that both immigrant and local workers have common interests and thus should be in common trade unions and organizations of the Left, which differentiates it from other perspectives in the anti-racist movement. The organization also supports migrant's rights, and challenges the far right and fascism. The Deport Racism Organization also took part in the movement defending the 300 immigrants' hunger strike in early 2011.

=== Youth ===
In high schools, the DEA is involved with the youth political organization School Students Against the System, as well as the University Students Against the System organization.

Each year, the student branches of the DEA organize a summer camp in late July. The summer camp is youth-oriented and attempts to combine political discussions with a kind of collective vacation in organized camping sites near the sea. The political discussions are promoted as an effort to build a youth perspective theoretically on issues of current politics, as well as historic events of the workers' movement and the Marxist tradition.

== Ideology ==
The DEA puts itself in the current of the revolutionary Marxist left, founded by Karl Marx and Friedrich Engels and continued by the Bolsheviks, the mass party that led the Russian Revolution of 1917. The organization refers to the contributions of Marxist revolutionaries, such as Vladimir Lenin, Rosa Luxemburg, Antonio Gramsci and Leon Trotsky. The DEA also acknowledges the contributions of Pandelis Pouliopoulos, the founding member and first General Secretary of the Communist Party of Greece (KKE) during the 1920s.

=== Principles ===
According to the organization's newspaper, the principles of the DEA are as follows:

- Socialism through the independent action of the working class,
- Revolution, and not reformism,
- Internationalism, and not "socialism in one country" or "socialism with national colours", and
- A revolutionary party of the most militant workers.
