= Socialist Solidarity =

Trotskyist organization in the Czech Republic

Socialist Solidarity (Czech: Socialistická Solidarita) is a Trotskyist organisation in the Czech Republic. It is part of the International Socialist Tendency.

It seems to have developed from a circle around a punk rock band which developed links with the British Socialist Workers Party.

In 1998 a group split from the organisation to form the Socialist Organisation of Working People.

At the end of the 1990s it was active mainly in anti-racist work, campaigning against the Republican Party. The group has been also deeply involved in INPEG, the umbrella group organising the protests against the IMF and the World Bank in Prague in 2000. This anti-capitalist protest was very successful, forcing the bankers to leave Prague one day earlier than planned. It was also at the centre of the protests against the war in Iraq in 2003. Socialist Solidarity is now campaigning mainly against the planned U.S. military radar base in Brdy, Czech Republic, through the initiative Ne základnám ("No" to the bases). Recently it joined big initiative called ProAlt against Czech right-wing government cuts, privatisation and other "reforms".

The group publishes a magazine called Solidarita, now issued monthly.
