= List of Trotskyist internationals =

This is a list of Trotskyist internationals. It includes all of the many political internationals which self-identify as Trotskyist.

Of the organizations listed, two claim to be the original Fourth International founded in 1938: the reunified Fourth International (USFI) and the International Committee of the Fourth International (ICFI). The Fourth International split into two factions 1953 over the question of historic perspective, with the International Secretariat (ISFI) turning in favour of deep entryism and supporting petty-bourgeois nationalist movements in less developed countries, and the International Committee (ICFI) upholding the need to form revolutionary parties. The factions reunited in 1963 resulting in the formation of reunified Fourth International (USFI), while parts of the ICFI did not. Both the USFI and ICFI went on to fragment further, giving rise to several new internationals.

Certain organizations which claim to be Trotskyist make no attempt to claim any relationship to the Fourth International in an organizational sense and argue that it no longer exists. Some claim to represent a continuity from the Fourth International or to have re-established it: for example the Fourth International (ICR) International Centre/Center of Reconstruction, also known as the FI (La Verité), also calls itself the "Fourth International".

The various organizations listed here range in size from those having thousands of adherents in dozens of countries to tendencies which can barely claim a dozen members in three or four countries.

== List of internationals ==
The largest internationals in terms of membership are indicated in bold.

=== Active ===
==== Internationals that emerged from the Fourth International (USFI) ====
- Fourth International Posadist (1962)
- Committee for a Workers' International, CWI (1974) refounded with the same name after a 2019 split.
- International Socialist Tendency, IST (1979) founded by expelled members of the original Fourth International in the 1950s
- International Workers League – Fourth International, IWL-FI (1982) founded by former members of the USFI.
- Current for the Permanent Revolution - Fourth International, CPR-FI (1989) Previously named Trotskyist Fraction - Fourth International. Founded by expelled members of the IWL-FI
- Revolutionary Communist International, RCI (1992). Split from CWI. Previously named International Marxist Tendency, IMT (2004–2024), and the Committee for a Marxist International, CMI (1992–2004)
- International Workers' Unity – Fourth International, IWU-FI (1997) split from IWL-FI.
- International Leninist Trotskyist Fraction, ILTF (1998) split from the TF-FI
- Permanent Revolution Collective, 2004 split from the ILTF.
- Tendency for the Reconstruction of the Fourth International, (2006) formed by expelled members of the TF-FI.
- International Revolutionary Left, (2010) split from IMT in 2010 and the CWI in 2019
- Revolutionary Communist International Tendency, RCIT (2011) founded by former members of the IST and L5I.
- International Socialist League, ISL-LIS (2019)
- International Socialist Alternative, ISA (2020) claims to be successor to the CWI after the 2019 split. ISA-R ( external faction)
- Internationalist Standpoint, IS (2022) split from International Socialist Alternative.
- Committee for Revolutionary International Regroupment (CRIR), founded by groups originating from the USFI and IWL-FI
- Liaison Committee for the Reconstruction of the Fourth International (CERCI), founded by the Bolivian party POR which broke off with the original Fourth International in the 1950s.
- International Revolutionary Workers' Current – Fourth International (CORI-QI)
- International Committee for the Reconstruction of the LIT of Nahuel Moreno (CIR)
- La Marx International, founded by the Nuevo PST in Argentina
- Socialism or Barbarism, founded by the Nuevo MAS in Argentina.

==== Internationals that emerged from the International Committee of the Fourth International (ICFI) ====
- International Committee of the Fourth International (WRP), ICFI (1953)
- International Communist League (Fourth Internationalist), ICL-FI) (1974) previously the international Spartacist tendency which split from the ICFI.
- International Bolshevik Tendency, IBT (1982) formed by expelled members of the international Spartacist tendency.
- International Trotskyist Committee, ITC (1984), founded by former members of the defunct Trotskyist International Liaison Committee. The latter was founded by expelled members of the ICFI in 1974.
- International Committee of the Fourth International (SEP), ICFI (1985)
- League for the Fourth International, LFI (1998).
- Organising Committee for the Reconstitution of the Fourth International, OCRFI (2016)
- Bolshevik Tendency, (2018) split from IBT.
- Liaison Committee for the Fourth International, founded by former members of the ITC.

==== Others ====
- Internationalist Communist Union, ICU (1976)

Timeline of Trotskyist political Internationals that emerged from the CWI

=== Defunct ===
- Liaison Committee for a Revolutionary Workers International, founded by former militants of the Argentinian MAS and PO
- Committee for a Workers' International (CWI), 1974–2019 – split into Committee for a Workers' International (Refounded) and International Socialist Alternative
- Coordinating Committee for the Refoundation of the Fourth International, CCRCI (2004-2020)
- International League for the Reconstruction of the Fourth International (ILRFI), 1976–1995
- Workers International to Rebuild the Fourth International (WIRFI)
- International Revolutionary Marxist Tendency (TMRI), 1965–1992
- Permanent Revolution
- Revolutionary Workers Ferment (Fomento Obrero Revolucionario, FOR)
- Trotskyist International Liaison Committee, 1979–1984
- Tendencia Cuartainternacionalista
- Fourth International (ICR), also called FI (La Verité) or FI (International Secretariat) 1981–2015
- Socialist Network (Post-Trotskyist, split from IMT)
- International Trotskyist Opposition] (ITO) 2022–2025 (Dissolved into LIS-ISL)
- League for the Fifth International (L5I), founded by expelled members of the IST. (1989-2025)

== See also ==
- List of Trotskyist organizations by country
- List of left-wing internationals
- List of communist parties
- List of members of the Comintern
