= Keep Left (South Africa) =

Trotskyist group in South Africa

Keep Left is a small Trotskyist group in South Africa which is affiliated to the International Socialist Tendency led by the Socialist Workers Party of Britain. The roots of the group go back to around 1987, and it has previously been called the International Socialists of South Africa (ISSA) and the Socialist Workers Organisation (SWO). ISSA attempted unite all South African groups in the International Socialist Tendency current, but the Keep Left tradition and the International Socialist Movement (South Africa) have tended to remain separate. Keep Left joined the South African Communist Party in the late 1990s, and began publication of Keep Left, which is still being produced. It has since left, concentrating its work in larger anti-capitalist movement. It was affiliated to the Anti-Privatisation Forum, formed 2000, and the Democratic Left Front.
