= Syrian Revolutionary Left Current =

Syrian Revolutionary Left party Arabic: حزب اليسار الثوري في سوريا French: Courant de la Gauche révolutionnaire en Syrie
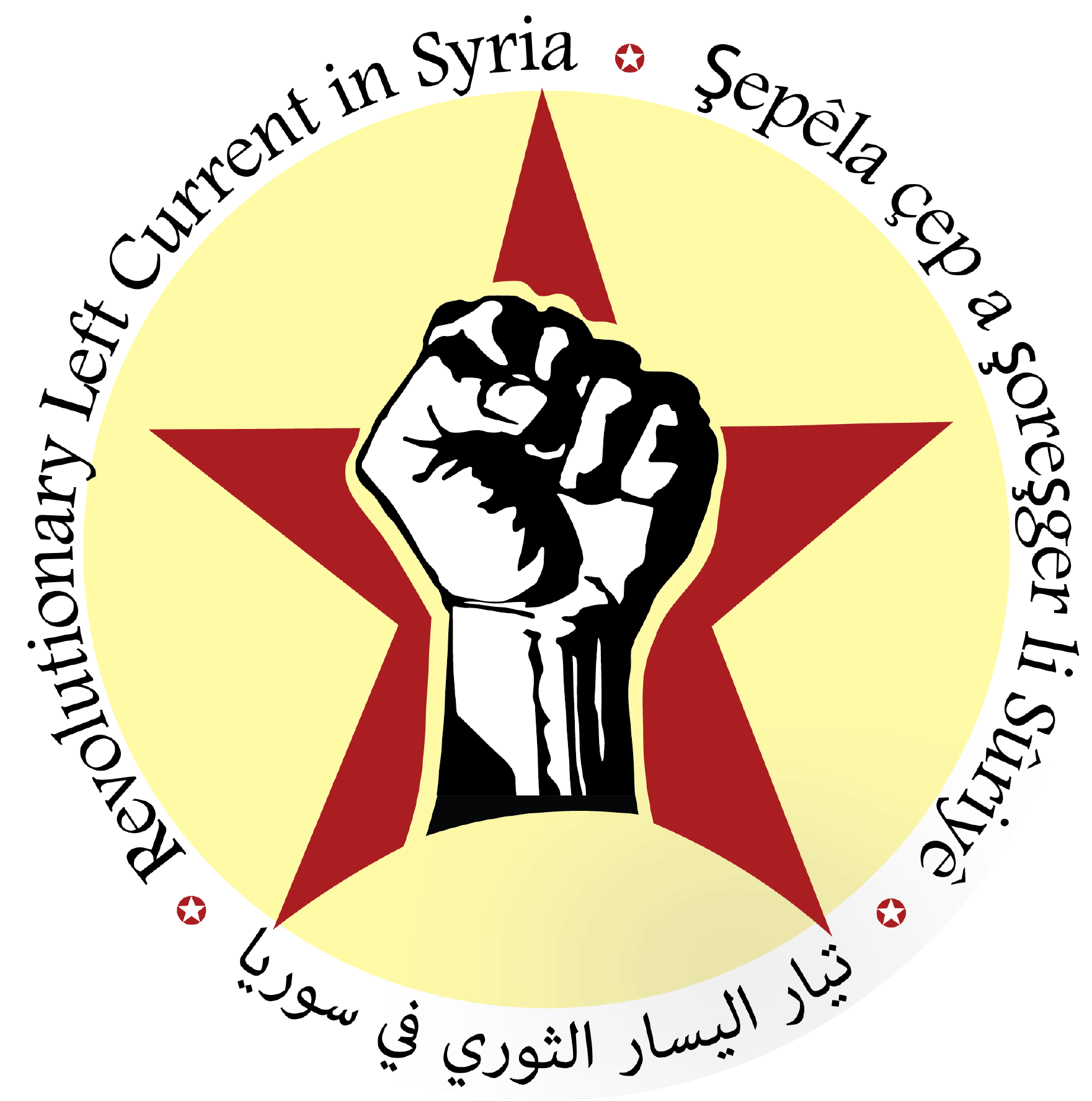
- Secretary-General: Ghayath Naisse
- Founded: October 2011
- Headquarters: Damascus, Syria
- Ideology: Trotskyism; Revolutionary socialism Democratic socialism Marxism; Participatory democracy Direct democracy Secularism
- International affiliation: International Socialist Tendency
- Colors: Red

Website
- https://revoleftsyria.org

The Syrian Revolutionary Left party is a Trotskyist political organization that opposed the Ba'athist-led government of Syria. Formed in October 2011, the group supports the uprising against the Syrian government and aims to build a "democratic, civil, and pluralist state" in Syria, while opposing any foreign military intervention in the Syrian Civil War.

== History ==
The Syrian Revolutionary Left Current (RLC) is a leftist political organization formed in October 2011 in the wake of the Syrian Revolution which began in March 2011. The revolution was part of larger anti-government protests across the Arab world that began in 2010 called the Arab Spring. The aim of the Syrian Revolution was to overthrow the Ba’athist led government in Syria. The party’s leader Bashar Al Assad had presided over the country for decades and the revolution aimed to build a "democratic, civil, and pluralist state" in Syria, while opposing any foreign military intervention in the Syrian Civil War.

- 2011 October - The group was formed as the "Committee to Support the Syrian Uprising.” However, a faction of the group advocated for revolutionary organized action and developed a document in mid-October 2011 for broad discussion, which became the “Transitional Program of the Revolutionary Left in Syria,” alongside the announcement of the formation of the “Revolutionary Left Current in Syria.”
- 2012 - The group establishes its official mouthpiece, the Front Line Newspaper.
- 2013 August - the RLC condemned the Islamic State of Iraq and the Levant (ISIL) and the al-Nusra Front. It also condemned the Syrian National Council for refusing to recognize rights for Kurdish people in Syria, in which it "reaffirmed its commitment" to support self-determination for Kurds in Syria.
- 2014 March - the group establishes the People’s Liberation Faction (PLF), its armed wing.
- 2014 July - the group condemns the actions of both the “fascist” Assad regime and the “reactionary counter-revolutionary” ISIL forces during the Aleppo offensive.
- 2014 September 23 - The group condemned the American-led intervention in Syria which involved airstrikes against ISIL, al-Nusra Front, and Ahrar al-Sham in Syria.
- 2016 September - The RLC formed an alliance with the Syrian National Democratic Alliance and the Syrian Democratic Forces (SDF) on the basis of political decentralization and the establishment of a pluralist democracy in Syria.
- 2018 January 20 - When the Turkish Armed Forces launched a military operation against the SDF in the Afrin Region, the RLC condemned the operation and announced its support for the SDF in Afrin against Turkey.
- 2022 July - The group announces its alliance with the Democratic Union party.
- 2024 December 14 - The group releases a statement in support of the fall of Assad regime and a detailed political analysis.

== Ideology ==
The RLC aligns with a tradition of “socialism from below,” a Marxist current that underscores workers’ self-emancipation and democratic mass participation instead of state-led reform. Conversely, they believe “socialism from above,” revolution led by vanguard movements, co-opts the struggle of the working class to replace the ruling class.

The RLC takes inspiration from the 1917 Russian Revolution and the role of worker councils in overthrowing the Tsarist state. They additionally draw on other revolutionary currents as examples of grassroots resistance, such as the 1930s Spanish Revolution and the Sudanese protest movement of 2018. To them, organizations must preserve a historical “memory of the working-class” struggle, attributing the failures of previous liberatory movements to the inability to link mass struggle to a broader socialist program.

The organization advocates for a “united front” strategy originally associated with the Bolsheviks and developed by revolutionary socialists in Europe in the early 20th century. The RLC connects this approach to debates amongst the revolutionary socialist figures such as Clara Zetkin, Antonio Gramsci, and Leon Trotsky, who defended united front strategies against their abandonment by sections of the Stalinist movement. Within the Syrian context, the RLC employs the united front strategy to cut across sectarian and ethnic divisions.

The group emphasizes mobilizing the workers and toilers of the underclass. To them, women are key to the working class revolution, and the feminist struggle opposes class-based, sexual subjugation as a means to repress dissent. They criticize the history of repression and cultural erasure of the Kurdish identity, emphasizing their vision for the full integration and rights guarantees. In alignment with this, they condemn Turkish President Recep Tayyip Erdoğan’s government as an authoritarian regime. They position their fight for freedom alongside the Palestinian struggle against foreign imperialism and colonial oppression. They additionally emphasize global capitalism as the root cause connecting issues of people’s autonomy to environmental collapse and the need for climate activism.

== Action ==
People's Liberation Faction
- Arabic: فصائل تحرر الشعب; French: Faction de la libération du Peuple
- Leaders: "Lorca"; "Midou"; "Abu Layla"
- Dates active: 18 March 2014 – 26 January 2015
- Allegiance: Syrian Revolutionary Left Current
- Part of: Free Syrian Army
- Wars: the Syrian Civil War

=== Armed Wing ===
Armed members of the Revolutionary Left Current operating in Syria announced themselves in January 2014. On 18 March 2014, three armed and masked militants announced the formation of the People's Liberation Faction as part of the Syrian Revolutionary Left Current. The RLC announced the establishment of the “People Liberation Faction” to coincide with the third anniversary of the Syrian uprising. The faction participated in the armed struggles against the Assad regime and “reactionary counter-revolutionary” Islamist forces. Fighters of the group were armed with Kalashnikov rifles, PK machine guns, and RPG-7s. The group also used a technical, a mortar, and a DShK heavy machine gun. It cooperated with several local Free Syrian Army-affiliated groups.

To them, militarization was a response to violent repression by the Assad regime and armed struggle is a means of defending civilians and revolutionary activists. In March 2014, they released a statement emphasizing continued participation in nonviolent forms of mass struggle and called for international solidarity with revolutionary and left-wing movements in Syria.

The organization's secretary general, Ghayath Naisse identifies a dual approach to overthrow the Assad regime. It includes peaceful demonstrations as well as armed resistance. Between 2011-2013 RLC aligned itself to the Free Syrian Army which was the primary group involved in armed struggle.

On 12 April 2014, a unit in the group attempted to redeploy fighters from the Hama Governorate to support other rebel groups in the Battle of Aleppo, when they were stopped at an al-Nusra Front checkpoint. Clashes then ensued and 3 fighters from the People's Liberation Faction were killed.

Fighters of the group redeployed to Kobanî in order to reinforce the city against an ISIL offensive in September 2014.

In late 2014, due to persecution by "counter-revolutionary forces", the People's Liberation Faction largely suspended its activities in Syria. It officially announced its dissolution on 26 January 2015.

=== Uniting the Left ===
Throughout its history, the RLC has been advocating for a united left. In 2022, the organization released a statement in regards to forming meaningful alliances whenever it serves the common cause.

After the fall of the Assad regime in 2024, the RLC stated its primary focus was rebuilding an independent left-wing movement within Syria amid ongoing sectarianism, economic crisis, and foreign intervention. The organization has argued that the Assad regime’s collapse has opened space for grassroots organizing while also leading to increased sectarian violence and authoritarian co-opting under Hay'at Tahrir al-Sham (HTS).

The RLC claims that sectarianism is the main method that the Assad regime and later armed factions employed to subvert political dissent. Post-Assad regime, the group identified the Syrian case within a “Thermidorian framework.” In response, the RLC advocates political alliances founded in shared social and economic demands. Such a party “must fight for a radical political and social transformation toward a democratic, egalitarian, and just society.”

The organization has focused on labor activism and trade union organizing. In interviews with RLC, activists participated in February 2025 demonstrations involving sanitation workers, teachers, lawyers, and other professional associations in cities including Damascus, Aleppo, Latakia, and Suwayda. RLC members described these formations as crucial mechanisms for challenging subsidy removals and dismissals carried out after the transfer of power.

The RLC also advocated support structures for military deserters, displaced people, and political dissidents. In 2014 RLC released a statement commemorating a member known as Abu Yazan, as an activist who refused conscription into the Assad regime’s armed forces and went into hiding before being arrested at a military checkpoint and ultimately killed. Using his example, the RLC argued for greater revolutionary organizing among rank-and-file soldiers and for the creation of safe conditions for activists. The organization presents these efforts as part of a broader strategy aimed at unifying revolutionary forces around demands for social justice and democratic political transformation.

== See also ==
- Leon Sedov Brigade, another Trotskyist Free Syrian Army unit in the Syrian civil war
