= International Socialist Organization =

- Leader: Collective leadership (Steering Committee)
- Founded: March 12, 1977
- Dissolved: 2019
- Headquarters: Chicago, Illinois, U.S.
- Newspaper: Socialist Worker
- Ideology: Communism; Socialism; Trotskyism
- Political position: Far-left
- International affiliation: Fourth International (permanent observer)

Website
- http://www.internationalsocialist.org/

The International Socialist Organization (ISO) was a Trotskyist group active primarily on college campuses in the United States that was founded in 1976 and dissolved in 2019. The organization held Leninist positions on imperialism and the role of a vanguard party. However, it did not believe that necessary conditions for a revolutionary party in the United States were met; ISO believed that it was preparing the ground for such a party. The organization held a Trotskyist critique of nominally socialist states, which it considered class societies. In contrast, the organization advocated the tradition of "socialism from below" as articulated by Hal Draper. Initially founded as a section of the International Socialist Tendency (IST), it was strongly influenced by the perspectives of Draper and Tony Cliff of the British Socialist Workers Party. It broke from the IST in 2001, but continued to exist as an independent organization for the next eighteen years. The organization advocated independence from the U.S. two-party system and sometimes supported electoral strategies by outside parties, especially the Green Party of the United States.

The organization emphasized educational work on the socialist tradition. Branches also took part in activism against the Iraq War, against police brutality, against the death penalty, and in labor strikes and other social movements. At its peak in 2013, the group had as many as 1,500 members. The organization argued that it was the largest revolutionary socialist group in the United States at that time. The ISO experienced discord in early 2019, upon exposure that its leadership mishandled an accusation of sexual assault in 2013 and voted to dissolve itself shortly afterward.

== Ideology ==
The ISO advocated replacing the capitalist system with socialism, a system in which society's collective wealth and resources would be democratically controlled to meet human need by those who produce that wealth, i.e. the working class. The organization believed that this working-class majority could end capitalism by leveraging their power over production through mass strikes.

Supporters of ISO referred to their beliefs as 'socialism from below', a term attributed to Hal Draper. This concept can also be traced back to the rules of the First International which stated: "the emancipation of the working classes must be conquered by the working classes themselves." ISO saw this as distinguishing themselves from socialists who work within the Democratic Party and from various forms of what they disparagingly termed Stalinism — nominally socialist politics, usually associated with the former Soviet Bloc and the orthodox Communist Parties. These are seen as advocating socialism "from above". Because capitalism is a global system, the ISO argued that capitalism could not be successfully overthrown in individual countries. They agreed with Leon Trotsky that socialism in one country is an impossibility. The ISO held that the former Soviet Union and Soviet Bloc were examples of bureaucratic, class-stratified states, not socialist societies; and that the People's Republic of China and post-revolutionary Cuba had emulated this model.

Some of the political theories adopted by the ISO had been developed in the British Socialist Workers Party, including that of "state capitalism" developed by Tony Cliff, the party's founder. State capitalist theory identifies the former Soviet Union and Eastern Bloc as exploitative class societies driven by military competition with private Western capitalism, rather than as the "deformed workers' states" that Trotsky maintained they were in The Revolution Betrayed. The organization tended to follow Cliff's view of these governments as state capitalist, although not all members held this analysis. After the split with the International Socialist Tendency in 2001, this particular characterization became less strict.

Following Vladimir Lenin, the organization believed the creation of a revolutionary workers' party was necessary in coordinating and building the power of a revolutionary working-class vanguard. However, ISO believed that the historical conditions in the United States were insufficient for the existence of such a vanguard party. For this reason, the organization saw itself as a preliminary group that could help to win reforms and raise consciousness until such time that a revolutionary party could be formed. Nonetheless, it aimed for a Leninist principle of democratic centralism in its internal deliberation process. The ISO emphasized the training of cadre, seasoned and educated militants. In theory, these cadre would build the organization as well as engaging in movement work, and would someday cooperate with other groups in order to build a new vanguard party.

The ISO supported struggles for economic, political, and social reforms while also maintaining that exploitation, oppression, war, and environmental destruction could not be eliminated until the overthrow of capitalism and its replacement with socialism.

The organization offered critical support to national liberation movements. Most notably, the organization advocated solidarity with Palestine and supported the Boycott, Divestment and Sanctions movement. ISO also supported Syrian revolutionary groups against Bashar al-Assad.

The organization advocated the right of gays and lesbians to marry as well as social validation of transgender identities. In the final years of its existence, the organization was in its expressed politics more strongly aligned with socialist feminist ideas and particularly Black feminism and intersectionality.

Philosophically, the organization defended the orthodox Marxist tradition from postmodernism. ISO was somewhat open to Western Marxist and Marxist humanist thinkers.

== History ==
The ISO originated in 1976 among groups in the American International Socialists (IS) that were growing increasingly critical of the organization's leadership. Among them was the self-identified Left Faction, led by Cal and Barbara Winslow and supported by the IS's Canadian and British members. The Left Faction and its international supporters maintained that the IS's leadership had acquired a top-down style of operating that depoliticized the organization and placed too much emphasis on sending student activists into working-class employment (a tactic called "industrialization"). These disputes followed the disagreements over the 1974 revolution in Portugal. Additionally, the main part of IS thought that there should be attention to rank-and-file or reform caucuses in unions, whereas the Left Faction contended that in addition to rank-and-file work, agitation at the workplace for socialism should continue. On March 12, 1977, the Left Faction was expelled from the IS and immediately formed the International Socialist Organization. The ISO began publication of its paper, Socialist Worker, shortly after its formation and produced a monthly print version and, later, a daily updated website until 2019. The ISO was initially the U.S. section of the International Socialist Tendency (IST) and followed closely the positions of the British Socialist Workers Party (SWP).

By 1991, ISO had about 150 members. In 1995, the organization launched a Campaign to End the Death Penalty in San Francisco. ISO also took part in the United Parcel Service strike of 1997.

In 2001, the ISO was expelled from the IST after a dispute with the British SWP. The SWP framed the dispute as a critique of the ISO's conservative approach to the anti-globalization movement. The ISO criticized the SWP for maintaining what the ISO saw as an exaggerated perspective for the 1990s, which the SWP called "the 1930s in slow motion". Still, the organization continued to grow. Juan Cruz Ferre writes, "The ISO famously managed to thrive during the worst years of neoliberalism and working-class retreat."

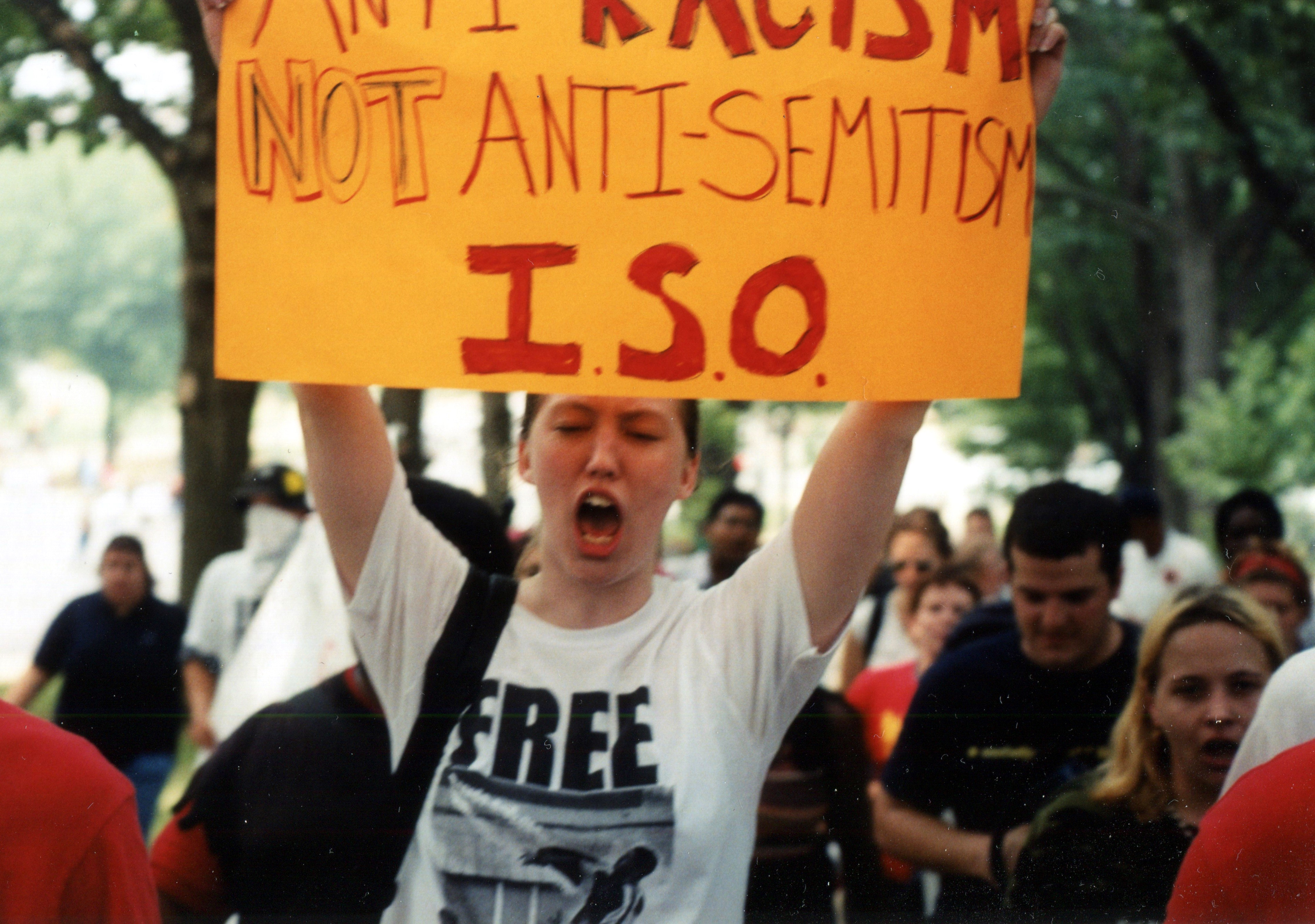
ISO member at a counter-protest against the National Alliance in Washington, D.C. in 2002

The organization organized and took part in protests against the Iraq War, became involved in the Campus Antiwar Network, and cooperated with Iraq Veterans Against the War.

By 2009, members argued that it was "by far the largest socialist organisation in the United States today, attracting to revolutionary ideas a much larger number of young activists than any of the others." Four years later, an outside observer estimated that the organization had "at least 1,500 members." The ISO also helped to organize the Chicago Teachers Union strike of 2012, which it called an example of a new era of Social movement unionism.

Even after the split with the IST, ISO continued to receive informal guidance from leaders of the UK SWP, such as Chris Harman. But the relationship deteriorated further after Harman's death and the 2013 crisis in the UK SWP. The ISO sharply rebuked Alex Callinicos for his "bureaucratic tendencies" in maintaining control in the fallout of a rape allegation. Ironically, a similar situation would lead to the dissolution of the ISO six years later.

At this time, the organization also became somewhat more open to ideas outside the tradition inaugurated by Cliff. In 2013, Richard Seymour observed a "lack of a set of 'lines.'" He wrote, "I know ISO members who are straightforwardly 'state cap,' others who are 'bureaucratic collectivist'. I know members who are 'Political Marxists', others who are more orthodox ... This is a far more diverse ecology inside one organisation than I have been used to." This period of openness led to controversy. While some commentators viewed this favorably, others said the organization remained sectarian. For example, Jeffrey St. Clair wrote in CounterPunch that ISO had become less socialist in membership and identification, and that they were more concerned with "lash[ing] out at nearly every popular uprising of the last 50 years for being doctrinally impure, from the Cuban Revolution to the Zapatistas, from the protests at the WTO to the Bolivarian Revolution."

In November 2013, nine members of the ISO, mostly in Providence and Boston, announced the formation of the ISO Renewal Faction, resulting in the organization's first national-level faction fight since the dispute with the British SWP. The faction claimed that the ISO was going through an organizational and political crisis and that members critical of the leadership had been "bureaucratically excluded". The ISO leadership denied these claims, saying, "the ISO is more experienced and more engaged than ever." In February 2014, the ISO expelled the Renewal Faction. In March, the organization's student branch at Brown University resigned, citing the faction's expulsion as an indication that the organization had "shown itself to be undemocratic." Beginning in 2017, many of ISO's cadre began to resign in order to join Democratic Socialists of America.

In the mid-2010s, the organization became involved in the new campus anti-rape movement, associated with figures such as Emma Sulkowicz. In 2017, ISO members strongly supported the Me Too movement. The organization began to embrace theoretical influences from intersectional feminism at this time.

At the ISO's 2019 convention, much of its longtime leadership was voted out over concerns about "unaccountable leadership structures and a damaging internal culture that had a disproportionate impact on people of color and others with oppressed identities." Soon after, an allegation of rape that occurred in 2013 surfaced against a newly elected leader. It was soon revealed that the leadership at the time forced the national appeals committee of the ISO to overturn an earlier finding of rape in order to clear the accused. The ISO was thrown into crisis, with up to a third of the membership resigning and several local branches disaffiliating.

On March 15, 2019, the ISO’s Steering Committee sent a letter its members about what it called "a deep crisis in the ISO" which they shared publicly on Socialist Worker. It begins,

Three weeks ago, the ISO held its most important convention, which was also its most painful. Much of the convention was devoted to reckoning with the damaging impacts of our past practices and internal political culture. As branches have reported back and opened up these discussions, more examples of a damaging political culture have come to light.

The letter details how on March 11 they received allegations of rape by a newly elected member of the Steering Committee, who resigned from the SC immediately and was expelled from the party shortly thereafter, as well as a committee to revisit the 2013 ISO leadership's failed to apply their disciplinary policy in responding to the allegations at the time. The letter explains a commitment to reviewing old procedures, creating new policies, and issuing forward-going apologies. It continues:

We believe it speaks both to failures of our political culture that we have identified as well as failures to adequately address the needs of survivors, a lack of understanding of the dynamics of rape and sexual assault, and the failure to create a process that could prioritize doing our best to determine the truth of what happened over bureaucratic proceduralism. ... Offenses like the failure of the disciplinary process were the worst products of culture presided over by a leadership that exerted control and had far too little accountability. But there are many other examples. Comrades from oppressed backgrounds were disproportionately impacted by these methods and this culture. Their commitment to the organization and to revolutionary socialism was questioned under the guise of a broad "identity politics" umbrella and comrades’ right to caucus was squashed in practice. Comrades with decades of trade union experience were held in suspicion for fear that they might stray too far from a course set out by the SC. Comrades who raised real questions about the ISO’s role in the new socialist movement were accused of violating principles. And the ISO’s leadership treated genuine concern from members about resources and personnel decisions as illegitimate expressions of “anti-leadership” sentiment.

After several weeks of debate, the ISO membership voted on March 28, 2019, to dissolve itself. On one side of the debate, ISO members felt "the discovery that the leaders of an avowedly anti-sexist organization intervened such that a member accused of rape was allowed to rise to our highest leadership body has been so destructive that it is hard to figure out how we can participate and move forward." Others claimed it was a "factional conspiracy" and described the conflict as "middle-class hysteria," arguing instead that it was "the political differences within the organization’s leadership that underlay the crisis that erupted during the week of March 11, 2019," balking that "readers are expected to believe that the alleged mishandling of an accusation of sexual assault, which occurred six years ago, has caused the political collapse of the International Socialist Organization."

== Publications ==
The ISO published a daily online and monthly print newspaper, Socialist Worker, with a bi-monthly Spanish-language supplement, Obrero Socialista. The ISO also distributed the International Socialist Review and titles from the publishing house Haymarket Books, both of which were run by the non-profit Center for Economic Research and Social Change.

Haymarket Books, founded in 2001 and considered the "publishing arm of the ISO," at the time of the 2019 controversy issued a public statement in support of survivors and alluded to the actions of members of the board of CERSC, and a consequent reshuffling of leadership.

== Electoral actions ==
The ISO participated in several local and national progressive movements. These include the antiwar movement, efforts to end the death penalty, support for gay marriage and abortion rights as well as the struggle for immigration rights, among others.

The ISO did not support the Republican Party or Democratic Party, both of which it viewed as political representatives of corporate power. However, the group campaigned for the Green Party in electoral races and assisted Ralph Nader's presidential campaigns in 2000 and 2004. In California in 2006, ISO member Todd Chretien ran against Dianne Feinstein for the Senate seat on the Green Party ticket, receiving 139,425 votes (1.8 percent). In 2013, the ISO endorsed Socialist Alternative's Kshama Sawant in her successful Seattle City Council election.

== Socialism conference ==
The ISO was the co-sponsor, along with the Center for Economic Research and Social Change, of an annual conference titled Socialism. Speakers at past Socialism conferences include filmmaker and author Tariq Ali, actors Wallace Shawn and John Cusack, The Nation writers Jeremy Scahill and Dave Zirin, journalists Amy Goodman, Glenn Greenwald, scholar Keeanga-Yamahtta Taylor, environmental writer John Bellamy Foster, science-fiction author China Miéville, Iraq Veterans Against the War member Camilo Mejía, Palestinian rights activists Omar Barghouti and Ali Abunimah.

== Notable former members ==
- Paul Le Blanc, activist and historian
- Brian Jones, schoolteacher, activist, actor, and 2014 Green Party of New York nominee for Lieutenant Governor
- Nancy MacLean, historian and National Book Award finalist
- Michael Letwin, public defender
- Jesse Sharkey, president of the Chicago Teachers Union
- Sharon Smith, journalist, author and women's rights activist
- Keeanga-Yamahtta Taylor, sociologist and activist
- Dave Zirin, sports writer
- Anthony Arnove, founder of Haymarket Books, editor, and literary agent
- Ahmed Shawki, influential Steering Committee member and author

== See also ==
- International Socialists
- List of Trotskyist internationals
- Workers' council
