= Miriyam Aouragh =

Dutch anthropologist (born 1972)

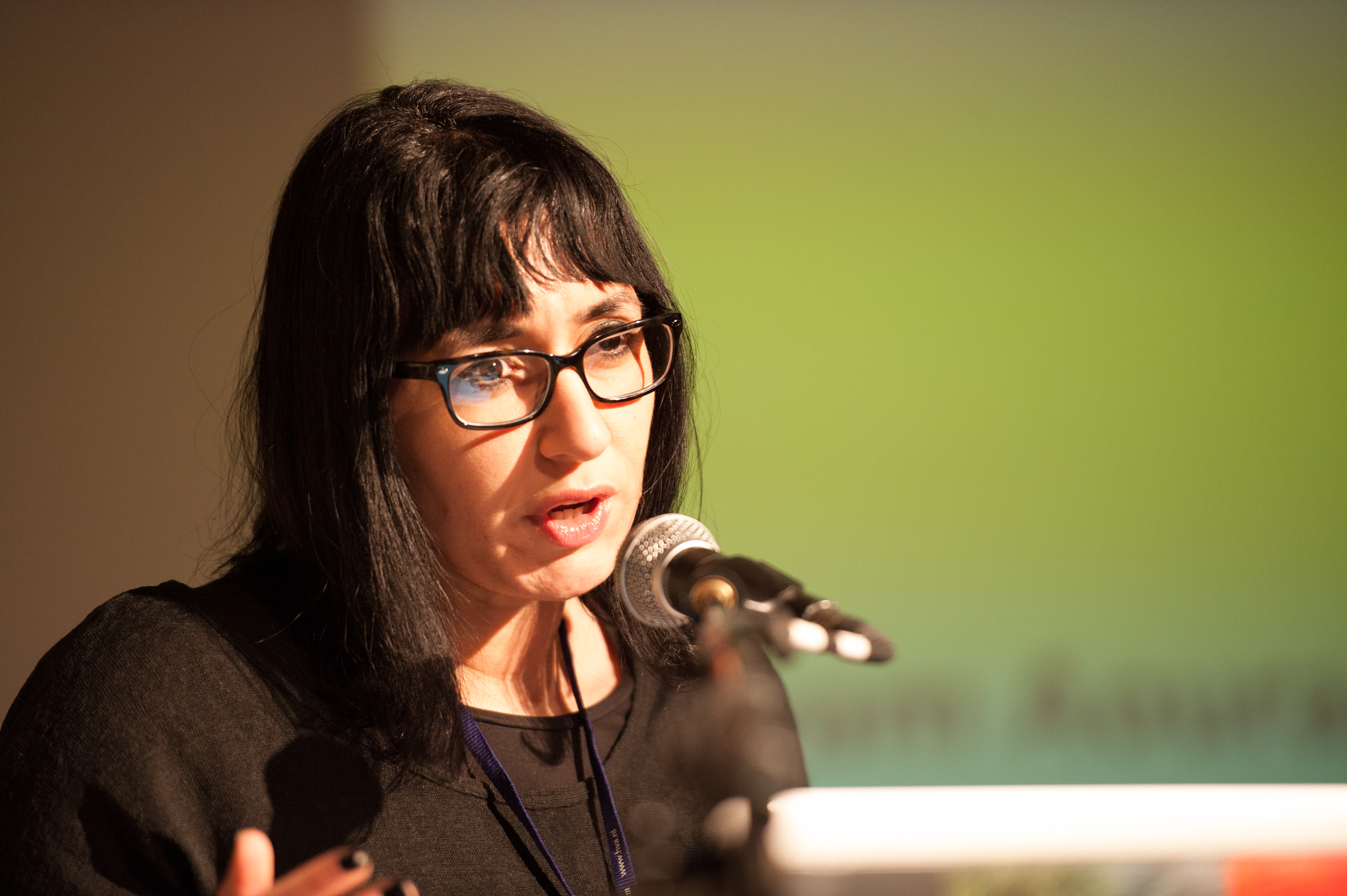
Miriyam Aouragh, 2013

Miriyam Aouragh (Amsterdam, 18 November 1972) is a Dutch-Moroccan activist and academic based in Oxford (UK). She writes and teaches about infrastructures, political uprisings and the social implications of digital media. She is Professor of Digital Anthropology at the University of Westminster.

== Biography ==
Aouragh was born to parents who had migrated to the Netherlands from Morocco. In the early 2000s, she was a student of virtual communities in Palestine, a member of the International Socialists, and active in Amsterdam as an activist for Moroccan youth and the Palestinian cause. She got her doctorate in anthropology (including such topics as "Palestine in Cyberspace") from the University of Amsterdam in 2008; her dissertation, Palestine Online, studied internet activism in Palestine, Jordan, and Lebanon, and was published in 2011. She published on the use of the internet and social media during the Egyptian revolution of 2011, Miriyam joined Oxford University in 2009 where she worked at the Oxford Internet Institute and at the Middle East Centre.
