= Socialist Workers Thailand =

Political organization in Thailand

Socialist Workers Thailand องค์กรสังคมนิยมแรงงาน
- Abbreviation: SWT
- Leader: Collective leadership
- Founder: Giles Ungpakorn
- Founded: 1998
- Ideology: Communism; Marxism; Trotskyism; Internationalism; Democratic socialism Anti-imperialism; Anti-zionism
- Political position: Far-left
- International affiliation: International Socialist Tendency
- Colors: Red
- Slogan: "ไม่ใช่วอชิงตันหรือมอสโก หากแต่เป็นสังคมนิยมสากล" (Neither Washington nor Moscow, but International Socialism); Translation from IST english slogan

Website
- https://socialistth.com/

Socialist Workers Thailand (Thai: สังคมนิยมแรงงาน), formerly known as the Workers' Democratic Group (กลุ่มประชาธิปไตยแรงงาน), is a Trotskyist political organisation in Thailand. Founded in 1998, it is a member of the International Socialist Tendency led by the Socialist Workers Party in the United Kingdom. The SWT views that only a social revolution can eliminate existing systemic violence and injustice. The SWT defines its goal of socialism as the establishment of democracy in both the political and economic spheres. Activities of the SWT are focused on the interests of the proletariat and radical democratic reforms through the creation of a welfare state and opposition to nationalism.

== Ideology and position ==
SWT describes itself as a Marxist organisation in the Trotskyist tradition, emphasising:

- Socialism from below by self-activity of the working class rather than top-down state socialism
- The party supports Karl Marx’s idea of the "dictatorship of the proletariat", and calls for restructuring the state by replacing standing armies and police with armed citizens, making judges elected and recallable, and ensuring public officials earn wages similar to ordinary workers.
- Adherence to Permanent revolution and internationalism, which informs their opposition to Stalinism, Maoism, and Nationalism.
- Stopping the Thailand-Cambodia conflict
- Strong criticism of Thai-style "semi-feudal, semi-capitalist" structures, including the monarchy's role in legitimising military and elite rule
- Solidarity with people of Palestine, Venezuela, and Iran against the Zionism and American imperialism
- Worker Control the means of production
- Liberation feminism and gender identity from sexual repression
