= Young Civilians =

The Young Civilians (Turkish: Genç Siviller) is a civil society / political organization and youth movement in Turkey. It was founded by a small group in 2007, and the organization has since grown in size and has supporters all over the globe, due in part to their social media presence. They are a diverse group by political ideology as well as by ethnicity, language, and religion. They disapprove of discrimination of any kind. They are firmly against the military getting involved in affairs of the state, and are pro-democracy. They organize marches, rallies, and protests, often with heavy use of humor and satire.
