= Michael Letwin =

American lawyer (born 1956)

Michael Letwin (born 1956) is a public defender in Brooklyn, New York,.

He is co-convener of New York City Labor Against the War (NYCLAW); a founding member of Labor for Palestine and former president of the Association of Legal Aid Attorneys. In the 1970s, he was a leader of the Red Tide, a newspaper and youth organization which he cofounded in 1971.
