= Workers' Solidarity =

Political organization in South Korea

Workers' Solidarity 노동자연대
- Abbreviation: 노연 ("Noyeon")
- Split from: Democratic Labor Party
- Headquarters: Jongno District, Seoul
- Ideology: Communism; Marxism; Trotskyism; Anti-imperialism; Anti-Zionism
- International affiliation: International Socialist Tendency
- Colors: Red

- Workers' Solidarity
- Hangul: 노동자연대
- Hanja: 勞動者連帶
- Revised Romanization: nodongjayeondae
- McCune–Reischauer: notongchayŏntae

Workers' Solidarity (Korean: 노동자연대; Nodongjayeondae) is a political organization in South Korea, affiliated with International Socialist Tendency. Workers' Solidarity publishes the weekly newspaper Workers' Solidarity (Korean: 노동자 연대; Nodongja yeondae). And they have a yearly forum, Marxism since 2001

== History ==
This organization was formed in 1990 by a group of leftists who subscribed to the state-capitalist theory developed by British Marxist Tony Cliff. Tony Cliff argued that socialist countries in the Eastern Bloc were actually state-capitalist countries. After the collapse of the Soviet Union, the organization began to grow. They called themselves as "International Socialists" at that time. Although they viewed North Korea as a state-capitalist country in need of revolution, the South Korean government began arresting members of the organization from 1992 until 2000. Many leftist figures including Jeremy Corbyn and Noam Chomsky criticized the south korean government's oppression and signed for release of captured members of this organization. Amnesty International also declared the captured members as prisoner of conscience and advocated for release of members.

Around 2000, they began joining the Democratic Labor Party. They used the name 'all together'(다함께) at that time. They launched a major public campaign against the Iraq War and neoliberalism.

During the 2008 US beef protest in South Korea, they actively participated. One of their activists at Korea University gained the media spotlight for her televised debate and was nicknamed "고대녀" (Korea Univ Girl).

They supported 2019 Hong Kong protest. They criticized the Chinese government and jumpstarted protest events in major Korean universities. This caused conflicts with some Chinese students who supported the CCP government.

Since October 2023, they have been running a public campaign for Palestine. Conservative media in South Korea like The Chosun Ilbo have criticized their activism as "far-left support for Hamas." In Seoul National University there was a conflict between student members of workers's solidarity who attached pro-palestine poster and the Israeli professor who damaged the poster.
