= List of left and far-left parties in Europe =

This is a list of European political parties that have been classified as centre-left or far-left on the political spectrum. The categorisation of some parties may vary in different sources.

Country	Party	Ideology
Belgium	Onward	Social Democracy
Belgium	Socialist Party (PS)	Social Democracy
Croatia	Workers' Front (RF)	Democratic socialism; Anti-fascism; Anti-capitalism; Socialist feminism; Direct democracy
Cyprus	Progressive Party of Working People (AKEL)	Communism; Marxism–Leninism; Reunification of Cyprus
Czech Republic	Communist Party of Bohemia and Moravia (KSČM)	Communism; Marxism; Euroscepticism
Czech Republic	Social Democracy (SOCDEM)	Social Democracy; Pro-Europeanism
Denmark	Socialist People's Party (SF)	Green politics; Socialism; Popular socialism; Democratic socialism; Eco-socialism; Feminism
Denmark	Red-Green Alliance (Enhl., Ø)	Socialism; Eco-socialism; Anti-capitalism; Euroscepticism
Estonia	Estonian United Left Party (EÜVP)	Democratic socialism; Eco-socialism; Russian minority politics; Russophilia
Finland	Left Alliance (VAS)	Democratic socialism; Eco-socialism
France	French Communist Party (PCF)	Communism; Soft Euroscepticism; Formerly: Left-wing nationalism
France	La France insoumise (FI)	Alter-globalisation; Democratic socialism; Eco-socialism; Environmentalism; Left-wing populism; Soft Euroscepticism; Souverainism; Left-wing nationalism
France	New Anticapitalist Party (NPA)	Anti-capitalism; Democratic socialism; Eco-socialism; Alter-globalisation; Progressivism; Feminism; Euroscepticism
France	Workers' Struggle (LO)	Trotskyism; Feminism; Anti-capitalism
Germany	The Left	Democratic socialism; Left-wing populism; Anti-capitalism; Antimilitarism; Factions: Left-wing nationalism
Greece	Communist Party of Greece (KKE)	Communism; Marxism–Leninism
Hungary	Hungarian Workers' Party	Marxism–Leninism; Euroscepticism
Iceland	Left-Green Movement (VG)	Democratic socialism; Eco-socialism; Feminism; Pacifism; Euroscepticism
Ireland	Sinn Féin (SF)	Irish republicanism; Left-wing nationalism; Democratic socialism
Ireland	People Before Profit Alliance (PBP)	Socialism; Trotskyism; Euroscepticism
Ireland	Solidarity	Socialism; Eco-socialism; Left-wing populism; Feminism
Italy	Communist Refoundation Party (PRC)	Communism
Latvia	Socialist Party of Latvia (LSP)	Communism; Marxism–Leninism
Netherlands	Socialist Party (SP)	Democratic socialism; Social democracy; Left-wing populism; Soft Euroscepticism
Netherlands	GreenLeft (GL)	Green politics; Social democracy; Pro-Europeanism
Norway	Socialist Left Party (SV)	Democratic socialism; Eco-socialism; Euroscepticism; Feminism
Norway	Labour Party	Social Democracy; Pro-Europeanism
Portugal	Left Bloc (BE)	Anti-capitalism; Multi-tendency; Eco-socialism; Feminism; Euroscepticism; Left-wing populism
Portugal	Portuguese Communist Party (PCP)	Communism; Marxism–Leninism
Portugal	Portuguese Workers' Communist Party (PCTP/MRPP)	Communism; Marxism-Leninism; Maoism; Anti-revisionism
Portugal	Socialist Alternative Movement (MAS)	Socialism; Trotskyism
Scotland	Scottish Socialist Party (SSP)	Democratic socialism; Anti-capitalism; Scottish independence; Scottish republicanism
Slovakia	Communist Party of Slovakia (KSS)	Communism; Marxism–Leninism
Slovakia	Direction – Slovak Social Democracy	Left-wing nationalism; Left-wing populism; Social democracy (Note: The social-democratic nature of SMER is disputed.); Social conservatism; Anti-immigration; Pro-Europeanism
Slovenia	The Left	Democratic socialism; Eco-socialism; soft Euroscepticism
Spain	Communist Party of Spain (PCE)	Communism; Marxism-Leninism; Internationalism; Republicanism; Federalism; Feminism; Laïcité
Sweden	Left Party (V)	Socialism; Feminism; Euroscepticism
Sweden	Swedish Social Democratic Party (SAP)	Social Democracy
Turkey	Workers' Party of Turkey (TİP)	Communism; Marxism–Leninism; Left-wing populism
Ukraine	Communist Party of Ukraine (CPU)	Communism; Marxism–Leninism; Soviet nationalism; Left-wing populism; Russophilia; Social conservatism
United Kingdom	Labour Party (LAB)	Social democracy; Democratic socialism
United Kingdom	Green Party of England and Wales (GRN)	Green politics; Eco-socialism; Progressivism; Pro-Europeanism; British republicanism
United Kingdom	Communist Party of Britain (CPB)	Communism; Marxism–Leninism; Anti-austerity; Euroscepticism; Socialism; Trade unionism; Political reformism

== See also ==
- List of communist parties represented in European Parliament
- List of socialist parties with national parliamentary representation
- List of social democratic and democratic socialist parties that have governed

== Literature ==
- Backes, Uwe; Moreau, Patrick (2008). Communist and Post-Communist Parties in Europe. Göttingen: Vandenhoeck & Ruprecht. ISBN 9783525369128.
- Daiber, Birgit; Hildebrandt, Cornelia; Striethorst, Anna (Eds.) (2012). From Revolution to Coalition – Radical Left Parties in Europe (PDF). Berlin: Rosa-Luxemburg-Foundation.
- Dunphy, Richard (2004). Contesting capitalism? Left parties and European integration. Manchester University Press. ISBN 9780719068041.
- Hloušek, Vít; Kopeček, Lubomír (2010). Origin, Ideology and Transformation of Political Parties: East-Central and Western Europe Compared. Farnham, Surrey and Burlington, VT: Ashgate. ISBN 9780754678403.
- March, Luke (2008). Contemporary Far Left Parties in Europe (PDF). Berlin: Friedrich-Ebert-Stiftung. ISBN 978-3-86872-000-6.
- March, Luke; Mudde, Cas (2005). "What's Left of the Radical Left? The European Radical Left After 1989: Decline and Mutation". Comparative European Politics. 3 (3). Palgrave Macmillan: 23–49. doi:10.1057/palgrave.cep.6110052. S2CID 55197396.
