= International Socialists (Norway) =

Trotskyist organization in Norway

The International Socialists (Norwegian: Internasjonale Sosialister) is a Trotskyist organisation in Norway founded in the early 1980s. It was part of the International Socialist Tendency led by the British Socialist Workers Party.

The roots of the IS date from the late 1970s when a revolutionary opposition began forming within Socialist Youth (SU), the youth organization of the reformist Socialist Left Party. This opposition was essentially an alliance between two distinct factions: the one influenced by the politics of the British Socialist Workers Party, the other with strong syndicalist tendencies. What united the two was their opposition to the reformist politics of the mother organization (SV), a strong orientation towards the working class, a focus on “revolutionary praksis”, and a clear rejection of the Stalinist politics of the Moscow-oriented Communist Party (Communist Party of Norway) and the Beijing-oriented Maoist party Workers' Communist Party.

By early 1980 the Socialist Youth opposition had won control of both the Oslo branch and the organization’s monthly magazine, Ungsosialisten. It also had considerable support in the local branches in Bergen, Trondheim, and Tromsø. On November 13, 1981, at the 6th Annual Conference of the Socialist Youth, the national leaderships of the Socialist Youth and the Socialist Left took action to rid themselves of the opposition by formally disbanding the youth organization and then reestablishing it the next day at a different location.

A week later the opposition constituted itself as an independent organization under the name "Arbeidermaktgruppa" (AMG, “Workers Power Group”) and started publication of a monthly newspaper called Arbeidermakt. Shortly thereafter, AMG was joined by small group of Trotskyists, adherents of the Fourth International.

AMG had an orientation towards activism and intervened in house occupations, strikes and other forms of protest. At the same time, considerable effort was put into theoretical discussions, in an attempt to reconcile the different positions of the three constituent tendencies. This was to no avail, however, and in February 1985, a large minority split away to form Internasjonale Sosialister (IS).

The first issue of the new group’s bimonthly magazine, Internasjonal sosialisme, published in February 1985, was unapologetically inward-looking and presented an extensive overview of IS’ theoretical foundation, with major articles by Knut Øygard, Ellisiv Rognlien, Helge Ryggvik, Øivind Østberg, and Steve Pepper on the need for a revolutionary party; the relationship between the party, the unions and the “movements”; and the theory of State Capitalism. Subsequent issues combine analysis of current events with articles about the revolutionary tradition.

Through the 1980s and into the 1990s the IS experienced a steady increase in its membership. There were branches in all the main cities in mid- and southern Norway. IS played an active part in the struggle against racism and neo-nazism, and was particularly known for its role in a wildcat strike in the transport sector in Oslo, where the workers in the end won against blacklegs, police and their bosses. Internasjonal sosialisme went from being a bimonthly magazine to a monthly and weekly newspaper, changing its name to Sosialistisk arbeideravis in the mid-90s.

In the early 2000s IS seems to have experienced difficulties, losing some members through a split in 2001 and others who disappeared when the organization put all its efforts into founding the new organisation ATTAC some years later. Unable to balance its membership between those two organisations, this seemed like an act of liquidation for the IS in Norway. In 2004 they announced that they would be abandoning production of their fortnightly paper in order to concentrate on producing a monthly magazine named Gnisten. As of April 2006, 14 issues of Gnisten had appeared and IS was planning a new event in its annual series of “Socialism from Below” seminars.

Recognizing the need for an effective parliamentary left party, IS decided at their general assembly 12–13 January 2008 to join the Red Party.

In March 2025, IS decided to collectively leave the Red Party over the party's support of Norwegian rearmament policies. They also cited a lack of space for internal dissent within the party. In the newspaper Klassekampen, three representatives of the organization declared that they wanted to build a "revolutionary alternative outside of the Red Party"
