= Ian Rintoul =

Australian activist

Ian Rintoul is an Australian political activist and Sydney resident, best known in Australia as a refugee advocate, and as spokesman for the Refugee Action Coalition Sydney (not to be confused with its Melbourne-based counterpart, the Refugee Action Collective (Victoria)).

He was a longtime member of the International Socialist Organisation, but was one of a large portion of the membership who left in 2003 around the issue of that group's involvement in the Socialist Alliance. He went on to be a founding member of the organisation Solidarity in Sydney, which merged with two other groups in 2008 to form a new organisation also named Solidarity.
