= International Socialist Group (disambiguation) =

International Socialist Group may refer to:

- International Socialist Group, British section of the USFI from the 1980s to the 2000s
- International Socialist Group (Cuba)
- International Socialist Group (Scotland), a 2011 breakaway from the Socialist Workers Party
- International Socialist Group (UK, 1952), a British organisation in 1952 and 1953
