= List of communist parties represented in European Parliament =

The following is a list of communist parties represented in the European Parliament. This list does not contain communist parties previously represented in European Parliament. This article lists only those parties who officially call themselves communist ideologically. In the 2019 European Parliament election seven communist parties were elected to the European Parliament in seven countries.

== List ==
Country	Party	Political Alliance	Electoral Alliance	European Party	European Parliament Group	MEPs
Belgium	Workers' Party of Belgium				The Left in the European Parliament – GUE/NGL	2 / 22
Cyprus	Progressive Party of Working People			Party of the European Left (observer)	The Left in the European Parliament – GUE/NGL	1 / 6
Czech Republic	Communist Party of Bohemia and Moravia	Stačilo!		Party of the European Left (observer)	Non-Inscrits	1 / 21
Greece	Communist Party of Greece	European Communist Action			Non-Inscrits	2 / 21
Portugal	Portuguese Communist Party	Unitary Democratic Coalition			The Left in the European Parliament – GUE/NGL	1 / 21

== Sources ==
- MEPs European Parliament Full list

== See also ==
- List of communist parties
- List of left and far-left parties in Europe
- 2019 European Parliament election
