= ProAlt =

- Founded: 8 August 2010
- Purpose: Anti-austerity protests Environmentalism; Alterglobalism; Anticapitalism; Human Rights
- Location: Czech Republic
- Method: Direct action, Demonstration, Discussion, Happening
- Key people: Ondřej Lánský; Tereza Stöckelová; Pavel Čižinský; Jiří Šteg
- Website: https://web.archive.org/web/20151008171738/http://proalt.cz

ProAlt is a citizens' initiative and a protest movement in the Czech Republic focusing on criticism of governmental cuts, neoliberal reforms and austerity programs, similarly to UK Uncut in the United Kingdom. Founded after the 2010 general elections, from which comes the government of Petr Nečas, it is seeking to find alternatives to the current political, social and economic discourse prevailing in the Czech Republic.
