= International Socialist Circle =

The International Socialist Circle (Spanish: Circulo Socialista Internacional) was an anarchist political organisation in Argentina, founded 1879 in Buenos Aires. It was the first formalised anarchist group in Argentina. From 1887 to 1888, Spanish and Italian anarchists affiliated with the group met in the Café Grutli on Calle Cerrito. According to the Marxist Augusto Kühn, the group came into conflict with Argentine Marxist organisations. After several permutations, the movement merged into the Argentine Regional Workers' Federation in 1901.
