= Socialisme International =

French Trotskyist organisation

Socialisme International (SI) was a small French revolutionary socialist organisation, founded in 1985 and publishing its magazine until 2009.

SI is based on the tradition of the British Socialist Workers Party (SWP) but is not formally a member of the International Socialist Tendency. SI entered into the Revolutionary Communist League in 2000. The group continued to produce a quarterly journal of the same name.

The people around Socialisme International have notably been active in recent years opposing the controversial ban on the wearing of Muslim headscarves in schools, (along with an alliance of Muslim and left organisations and individuals) and supporting the idea of a united radical Left candidate for the 2007 presidential elections.

== History ==
The origins of the group lie in a small group of former members of Lutte Ouvriere who left that group in 1974 expecting to join a larger group, Union Ouvrière, who had broken from LO the previous year. They found that UO had already disintegrated with its members going in many different directions. They therefore formed a group of their own, named Combat Comuniste.

Combat Comuniste existed for a period but only as a tiny grouping, it had many problems and was somewhat heterogeneous which led to its failure. By this point some of the leadership of the group had been won over to the positions of the International Socialists (as the British SWP was then called). Therefore, they sought to win other militants to their views prior to launching an independent group of their own and joined the Ligue Communiste Revolutionnaire (LCR) to further that aim. After a period they were to leave and found the Socialisme International group.

During the 1990s, Tony Cliff, the leading theoretician in the British Socialist Workers Party encouraged Socialisme International to follow the successful example of Linksruck who entered the youth section of the SPD and grew substantially and join the French Socialist Party. This caused a split, with some leaving entirely and others founding a group called Action, then Action à gauche, and finally Socialisme Par En Bas.

The group that was left after the split renamed themselves Gauche! and later Socialisme before reclaiming the name "Socialisme International". In 2000 SI once more joined the LCR. It was followed two years later by Socialisme Par En Bas. Its members were involved in the foundation of the New Anticapitalist Party, which is the present policy of the LCR. In 2008, the organisation closed down their own independent publication. In 2012, they left the NPA as part of the wider group Gauche Anticapitaliste (Anticapitalist Left).

== See also ==
- Marxism
- Trotskyism
- Revolutionary socialism
- International Socialist Tendency (IST)
