= International Socialists (Netherlands) =

International Socialists Internationale Socialisten
- Leader: Central Committee
- Founded: 1988
- Headquarters: Amsterdam
- Membership: 100–150
- Ideology: Trotskyism
- Political position: Far-left
- International affiliation: International Socialist Tendency

Website
- https://socialisme.nu

International Socialists (Dutch: Internationale Socialisten, abbreviated IS) is a revolutionary, Trotskyist organisation in the Netherlands. It is part of the International Socialist Tendency led by the British Socialist Workers Party.

== History ==
The International Socialists were founded in 1988 as Groep Internationale Socialisten (GIS). In the 1990s and early 2000s the organisation was mostly active in anti-fascist organising (against the Centrum Democraten, Pim Fortuyn and Geert Wilders) and anti-war protests, for instance against the Iraq War. in 2006 the group attempted to enter the Socialist Party (SP), however this project was abandoned after the SP leadership forced the IS members to choose between their SP membership or their IS membership. Eventually it was decided by the SP that dual membership of the SP and IS was prohibited.

== Ideology ==
The IS believes that real change in the Netherlands can only come through revolution, although it is not opposed in principle to electoral work. It does not participate in such work at present, but believes in an activist party. The IS sees itself as standing in the tradition of people like Leon Trotsky, Vladimir Lenin and Rosa Luxemburg. It is anti-capitalist, anti-war and in general against "all ideas that put people against people", like racism, sexism and homophobia. Currently, the Internationale Socialisten are largely active in the anti-war and anti-racism movements, as well as in the resistance against the austerity measures of the rightwing minority government of the People's Party for Freedom and Democracy of prime-minister Mark Rutte and the Christian Democratic Appeal, which is supported by the Party for Freedom of Geert Wilders and the Reformed Political Party.

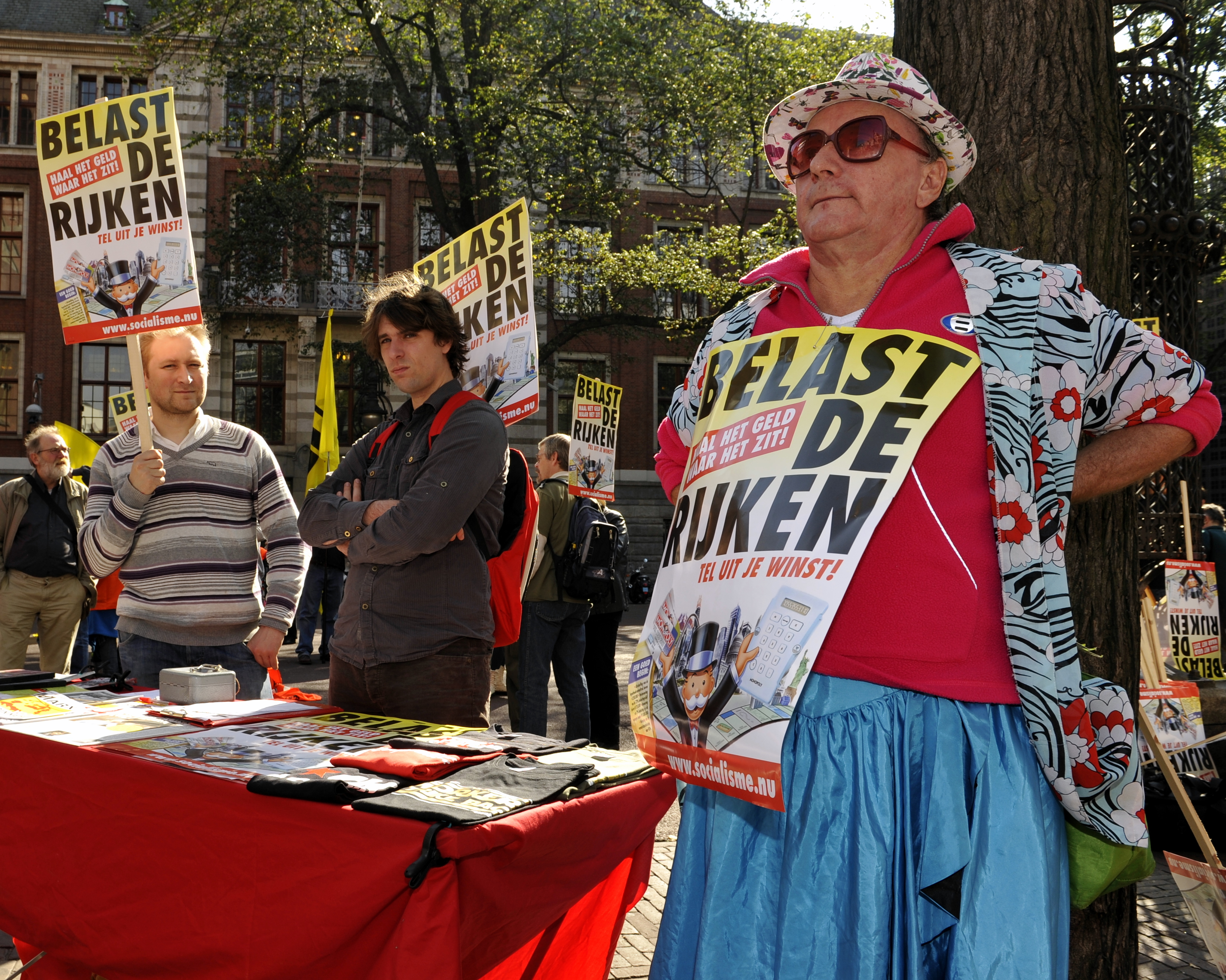
Surrounding De Nederlandsche Bank, 2009

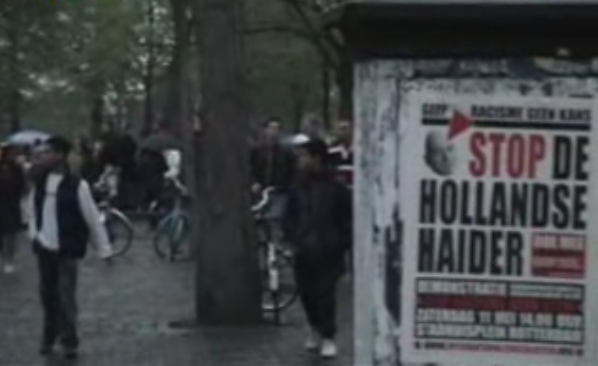
IS poster calling for a demonstration against Pim Fortuyn, 2002

Politically, the IS is located on the left of more mainstream leftwing parties like the Socialistische Partij and GroenLinks. It is part of the International Socialist Tendency, which also includes the British Socialist Workers Party.

== Activities ==
Every year, the IS organises its own 'Marxism Festival', which is open to anybody interested, in which the more theoretical issues of socialism and activism are discussed. It also holds regular discussion meetings and is often present at political meetings organised by other groups, either invited or uninvited.

Internationally, the IS has taken part in the first two European Social Forums held in Florence and Paris, and is often active in international protests.

== Notable members ==
- Anne Fleur Dekker (resigned from IS in 2018)
- Miriyam Aouragh

== See also ==
- International Socialist Tendency
