= International Socialist Organisation (Ghana) =

Trotskyist organisation in Ghana

The International Socialist Organisation is a Trotskyist organisation in Ghana. It is a member of the International Socialist Tendency led by the British Socialist Workers Party.
