= Workers' Democracy (Poland) =

Trotskyist organisation in Poland

Workers' Democracy Pracownicza Demokracja
- Leader: Andrzej Żebrowski
- Founded: 1990
- Ideology: Trotskyism; Socialism; Marxism; Internationalism
- Political position: Far-left

Workers' Democracy (Polish: Pracownicza Demokracja, PD) is a small Trotskyist group in Poland. Originally named Socialist Solidarity, it is affiliated with the International Socialist Tendency.

== Programme and ideology ==
Workers' Democracy advocates for the abolishment of capitalism through an anticapitalist, socialist revolution and replacing the former system with workers' democracy. Their programme advocates for a system based on workers' committees and workers' councils established in the workplaces. WD's supporters are against racism, fascism and antisemitism. The Movement is also progressive, adhering to feminism, and fighting against LGBT+ discrimination.

Workers' Democracy claims that in Poland, Czechoslovakia and the USSR (from circa 1928 onwards) and other people's democratic states established state capitalism, rather than socialism. The movement argues that the workers had no control over the economy and the state, and the power was held by a vanguard party, separate from the workers' interests.

The movement also argues, in opposition to other Trotskyist movements, that the Cuban and Chinese revolutions were not workers' revolts, but a "permanent revolution that has diverged from its course". Workers' Democracy argues that these revolts are leading to state capitalism, rather than socialism, due to the revolutions being led by the middle-class, rather than the working class.

In the movement's opinion, the lack of crisis of capitalism since World War II, comes from a permanent militarist economy, that has managed, up to the 1970's, to avoid reaching the said crisis.

== Activity ==
Workers' Democracy is organizing various debates, cultural events and film projections. Every year, the organization co-organizes an "Anticapitalism Weekend", which has been attended by various guests, including Tadeusz Kowalik, Albert Garcia, Roman Kurkiewicz and Piotr Ikonowicz. The movement also is a part of the "11th of November Coalition", that serves a purpose of blocking the Independence March, that happens annually in Warsaw.

The movement is one of the main founders of the anti-war movement in modern-day Poland. Workers' Democracy has participated in protests against American interventions in Afghanistan and Iraq, and is supportive of the Palestinian efforts against Israel, along with "all other real national liberation movements".

It publishes a monthly magazine of the same name.

== Electoral activity ==
Workers' Democracy has not run in any elections as a movement, however it has supported numerous left-wing candidates in many elections:

- The movement initially supported Maria Szyszkowska in the 2005 presidential elections, however she could not gather the minimal amount of signatures in order to run for the office.
- Workers' Democracy has supported, during the 2005 Polish parliamentary elections, the list of the Polish Labour Party - August 80, and their preferred presidential candidate was Daniel Podrzycki.
- The tragic death of Podrzycki led the WD to boycott both rounds of the presidential elections, however, two years later, the movement has again supported the Polish Labour Party. In 2010, it has supported Bogusław Ziętek
- In 2011 parliamentary elections, it refused to support any parliamentary list. Their support for the Labour Party came due to many candidates on the list coming from the nationalist background.
- During the 2014 European Parliamentary Elections, the WD supported the Green Party.
- In 2015 parliamentary elections, the movement announced its support for the Together Party.
- In 2019 parliamentary elections, the movement encouraged to vote for the most "radical" members of the Together Party and SLD.
- In 2023 parliamentary elections, the movement encouraged to vote for the most "radical" members of The Left.
- In 2025 presidential elections, the movement announced its support for Adrian Zandberg, candidate of the Together Party.
