= International Socialist Movement (South Africa) =

The International Socialist Movement is a small Trotskyist group in South Africa, which shares much of the politics of (but is not affiliated to) the International Socialist Tendency led by the Socialist Workers Party of Britain. Founded in 1989, it joined the Workers Organisation for Socialist Action in forming the Workers List Party for the 1994 South African general election.
