= Socialist Workers' Party (Greece) =

Socialist Workers Party (Greece) Σοσιαλιστικό Εργατικό Κόμμα
- Founded: 1971 (as OSE); 1997 (as SEK)
- Newspaper: Workers' Solidarity, Socialism from Below
- Ideology: Trotskyism; Revolutionary socialism
- National affiliation: Anticapitalist Left Cooperation for the Overthrow
- European affiliation: European Anti-Capitalist Left
- International affiliation: International Socialist Tendency

Party flag
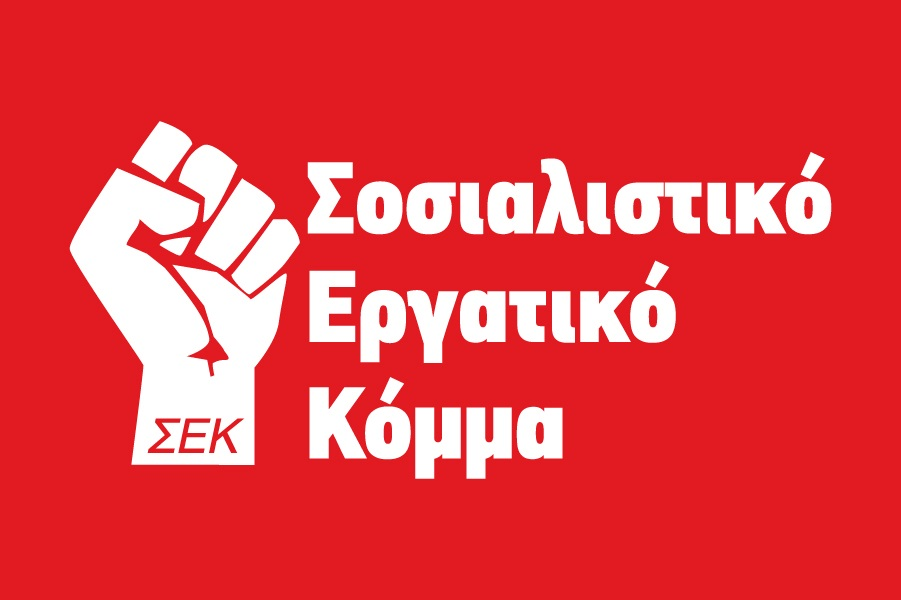

Website
- sekonline.gr

The Socialist Workers Party in Greece (Greek: Σοσιαλιστικό Εργατικό Κόμμα, ΣΕΚ; translit. Sosialistikó Ergatikó Kómma, SEK) is an affiliate of the International Socialist Tendency (IST). It is the second largest organisation in IST after the British Socialist Workers Party.

== History ==
SEK originated among a group of exiled Greek students in London, led by Maria Styllou and Panos Garganas, and a group of Greek students during the occupations of universities against the Greek junta. In the beginning, they organised themselves as the Socialist Revolution Organisation (OSE; Οργάνωση Σοσιαλιστικής Επανάστασης, ΟΣΕ). While in London, they developed relations with the International Socialists led by Tony Cliff and were won to the politics of the IST.

In the early 1980s, the OSE developed closer links with the IST, grew fairly rapidly, and in 1997 changed their name to the Socialist Workers Party. In 2001, a minority left to form the Internationalist Workers' Left (DEA) organisation. SEK publishes a weekly newspaper, Workers' Solidarity (Εργατική Αλληλεγγύη), and a bi-monthly magazine, Socialism from Below (Σοσιαλισμός από τα Κάτω). A distinct presence is maintained by SEK students, who sign as SEK on Campus (ΣΕΚ στις Σχολές).

The SEK is active in a number of organisations, including the Greek "Stop the War Coalition" (Συμμαχία Σταματήστε τον Πόλεμο) and "United Against Racism and the Threat of Fascism" (Κίνηση Ενωμένοι Ενάντια στο Ρατσισμό και τη Φασιστική Απειλή, ΚΕΕΡΦΑ).

In the 2006 Greek local elections for Athens-Piraeus Super Prefecture, the SEK supported candidates under the banner "Συμμαχία για την Υπερνομαρχία" (Symmachia gia tin Ypernomarchia, "Union for the Super Prefecture") which took 1.32%.

In October 2023, SEK released a statement declaring their support for Palestine in the Gaza war.

== Electoral results and tactics ==
Results since 1996 (year links to election page)
Year	Coalition	Type of Election	Votes	%	Seats
1999	None	European Parliament	8,049	0.13	–
2000		Parliament	proposed vote to Synaspismos, KKE, DIKKI		
2004	Anti-Capitalist Coalition	Parliament	8,313	0.10	–
2004	Anti-Capitalist Coalition	European Parliament	11,938	0.19	0
2007	United Anti-Capitalist Left	Parliament	10,595	0.15	0
2009	Anticapitalist Left Cooperation for the Overthrow	Parliament	24,735	0.36	0
2012	Anticapitalist Left Cooperation for the Overthrow	Parliament	75,439	1.19	0
2012	Anticapitalist Left Cooperation for the Overthrow	Parliament	20.389	0,33	0
