= International Socialist Organization (Botswana) =

Political party in Botswana

International Socialist Organisation
- Newspaper: Socialism from Below
- Ideology: Communism; Marxism; Trotskyism; Socialism
- International affiliation: International Socialist Tendency

The International Socialists Botswana (ISBO) is a small Botswanan Trotskyist organisation. It is part of the International Socialist Tendency and produces a newspaper called Socialism from Below.

They have campaigned over workers rights, particularly the workers sacked from the Debswana mine (a DeBeers and Government of Botswana partnership). They also support the Basarwa/Bushmen in their resistance against forced relocation by the Botswana Government out of their ancestral land, the Central Kalahari Game Reserve.

They are the only Botswanan political group who publish a regular newspaper.
