= Workers' Democracy (Cyprus) =

Cypriot political party

Workers' Democracy (Greek: Εργατική Δημοκρατία, Ergatiki Dimokratia) is a Trotskyist progressive political party in Cyprus. It is part of the International Socialist Tendency founded by the British Socialist Workers Party.
