= International Socialist Tendency =

International group of Trotskyist organisations

- Established: 1979
- Type: Trotskyist International
- Headquarters: London
- Members: 14 affiliated groups (2017)
- Website: internationalsocialists.org

The International Socialist Tendency (IST) is an international grouping of unorthodox Trotskyist organisations espousing the ideas of Tony Cliff (1917–2000), founder of the Socialist Workers Party (SWP) in Britain (not to be confused with the unrelated Socialist Workers Party in the United States). IST supporters are sometimes called "Cliffites". It has sections across 27 countries; however, its strongest presence is in Europe, especially in Britain.

The politics of the IST are similar to the politics of many Trotskyist Internationals. Where it differs with many is on the question of the Soviet Union, the IST adopting the position that it was a "state capitalist" economy, rather than a "degenerated workers' state" along with their theories of the "permanent arms economy" and "deflected permanent revolution". The IST sees the often referred to "socialist" countries, such as the former Eastern Bloc states, China, Vietnam, North Korea and Cuba as an inverse of classical Marxism, arguing they are "Stalinist" in nature.

Unlike many international tendencies, the IST has no formal organisational structures and has only ever made one publicly known decision, which was to expel the US International Socialist Organization (ISO) from its ranks. However, the antecedents of the IST go back to 1950 when the founders of the British Socialist Review Group (SRG), supporters of Cliff, were expelled from The Club and thus from the Fourth International.

== History ==
=== 1950s ===
Through the 1950s, the SRG had a loose relationship with the US Independent Socialist League (ISL) led by Max Shachtman until it dissolved in 1958. It then retained links with members coming out of that group and with other individuals in the international Trotskyist movement. But there was no significant growth in support for its ideas until the late 1960s. Some of the ideas of the IST, such as the permanent arms economy, were originally developed from writings published by the ISL. The theory of the permanent arms economy was developed by T. N. Vance in a series published throughout 1951 in the ISL journal New International and was later refined by Cliff in the late 1950s and over the years by key International Socialist (IS) theoreticians such as Mike Kidron, Nigel Harris and Chris Harman in later years.

=== 1960s–70s ===
In the 1960s, the International Socialists (as the group was now called) established links with militants in a number of countries, which led to the formation of IS groups in those countries. Perhaps the first such group was the Irish IS group founded in 1971, followed by groups in Australia, Canada and Germany. Meanwhile, links were built with the Independent Socialists (later International Socialists) in the U.S. These links led to a split in the American IS in 1978 and the formation of the ISO; a group which was more closely linked to the British IS.

During the late 1960s, the British IS also attended a series of meetings held by the French Lutte Ouvriere (LO) group which were also attended by the American IS. In many quarters the IS and LO groups were seen as constituting a loose semi-syndicalist tendency within world Trotskyism in this period. The meetings were also attended by a wide variety of groups such as the Italian Autonomia Operaia but petered out.

Despite this growth there was no formal organisation. However, international meetings of the leaderships of the IS tendency did develop, usually held in conjunction with the (renamed in 1977) British Socialist Workers Party's Marxism Summer School, held in London. This was the foundation of the IST which at some point in the 1990s came to be referred to thus with capitalisation.

=== 1980s ===
Through the 1980s, the IST grew internationally, in part, as other revolutionary socialist tendencies entered into crisis thus removing competitors. New IS groups appeared in France, Belgium, Denmark, Netherlands, Norway and in Greece the Socialist Revolution Organisation (OSE) which had been loosely linked to the IS in the 1970s rejoined the tendency. A group of Turkish comrades were also recruited in exile during this period, its members living in Germany and Britain.

=== 1990s ===
The 1990s saw more international growth for the IST as groups were founded in yet more countries including Austria, Cyprus, Spain, New Zealand, South Africa, Zimbabwe and South Korea. Groups were also founded in the former Eastern Bloc states as contact could be sustained in those countries for the first time after the collapse of the USSR. This led to the foundation of IS groups in Poland and the Czech Republic. A group linked to the IST existed in Russia but collapsed.

However, the 1990s also saw a number of splits and expulsions for the IST. While there was a great deal of geographical expansion there were also losses and fragmentation. There were a number of splits which were unrelated to each other but seemed to have a common cause. Those causes were a concern among some members of the groups concerned that the internal regime of their own group had become bureaucratised and lacked in democratic accountability. Sometimes this was associated with the involvement in the internal affairs of the group by representatives of the SWP, as well as the political orientation of the group. Among the groups affected by such splits were those based in Germany, South Africa, Ireland, Zimbabwe, Australia, Aotearoa/New Zealand, Canada and France. In Belgium, the majority of the group joined the Belgian affiliate of the Committee for a Workers' International.

The Australian split, Socialist Alternative, was formed following the bureaucratic expulsion of 5 Melbourne members from the ISO. They subsequently consolidated their politics as a "propaganda group", arguing against the IST focus on united fronts, that "all 'united fronts' between small socialist groups and mass reformist organisations would achieve is to give a left cover to the reformists".

=== 2000s ===
The 2000s saw contradictory developments for the IST. New groups were formed in a number of countries for the first time as in Pakistan, Botswana, Lebanon, Uruguay, Finland, Sweden and Ghana. However the largest groups in the IST outside Britain have both split and sections of them have left the IST. Thus in the US the ISO's leadership entered into a dispute with the leadership of the SWP as to the significance of the anti-capitalist and anti-globalisation movements following the World Trade Organization demonstration in Seattle. This led to the ISO being expelled from the IST and a small faction (sympathetic to the SWP) leaving it to form Left Turn (LT). Ironically, LT also left the IST in 2003 leaving the tendency with no affiliate in the US. Very small numbers of people sympathetic to the SWP operate in the US Keep Left and the US Solidarity, but with no official link to the IST. Meanwhile, in Greece the OSE (which had renamed itself the Socialist Workers Party) split on similar lines with a substantial minority forming the Internationalist Workers Left. New Zealand's official group (Socialist Worker) triggered an international debate within the IST, when on 1 May 2007, it presented a May Day statement to the IST, calling on it to "engage with the mass revolutionary process in Venezuela". The group dissolved itself only a few years later.

=== Today ===
In 2011, members of the Zimbabwean affiliate – the International Socialist Organisation – face the potential death penalty for hosting a meeting discussing the revolutions in Egypt and Tunisia.

Since 2013, the IST has suffered a serious crisis after the allegations of rape made against 'Comrade Delta' within the British SWP became more widely known. In January 2013, the IST's section in Serbia, Marks21, left the IST over the scandal. In March 2013, I.S. Canada founding member Abbie Bakan, former Socialist Worker editor Paul Kellogg, theorist John Riddell and other leading members released a public statement announcing their resignation from the group after a motion to write a public letter of concern to the British SWP over its handling of the scandal was voted down at their annual convention. However, the SWP in Ireland passed a resolution condemning the British SWP's Central Committee. As of June 2014, around 700 members of the British SWP have resigned from the group. Three separate splinter groups from the British SWP were formed after the beginning of the scandal, the International Socialist Network (ISN), Revolutionary Socialism in the 21st Century (RS21) and the International Socialists (Scotland), though two of those three groups are now defunct. rs21 was launched as a "fluid and possibly temporary" grouping aiming to organise with the perspective that "the basis for a genuine mass revolutionary party does not exist in the British working class movement, but nonetheless revolutionaries must do what they can to help facilitate this goal".

In 2019 in the United States, a new affiliate group Marx21 was launched aiming to "bring together activists who want to fight for the politics of socialism from below, inside the movements and in the struggles of today", encouraging the use of "political tools such as the United Front" and inspired by the IST.

== Affiliate organisations ==
The listing below is neither fully comprehensive, as there are additional groups not mentioned in official lists found on IST websites, nor completely accurate. IST sources often containing references to Suara Socialis in Indonesia and Malaysia, are in fact websites only. Many IST sources also refer to the Organización Socialista Internacional of Puerto Rico as being in the IST but it is actually close to the ISO. Some other small groups existing in various countries cannot be mentioned for legitimate security reasons. In addition there are IST type groups in a number of countries unconnected to the IST as in Germany, Greece, the US, Australia and New Zealand.

Country	Affiliate name (English)	Affiliate name (Country of origin)
Australia	Solidarity	
Austria	Left Turn	Linkswende
Botswana	International Socialist Organization	
Brazil	Revolts	Revolutas
Canada	International Socialists	
Cyprus	Workers' Democracy	Ergatiki Demokratia
Czech Republic	Socialist Solidarity	Socialistická Solidarita
Denmark	International Socialists	Internationale Socialister
Ghana	International Socialist Organisation	
Great Britain	Socialist Workers' Party	
Greece	Socialist Workers' Party	Sosialistiko Ergatiko Komma
Ireland	Socialist Workers Network	
Netherlands	International Socialists	Internationale Socialisten
New Zealand	Socialist Aotearoa	
Nigeria	Socialist Workers League	
Poland	Workers' Democracy	Pracownicza Demokracja
South Africa	Keep Left	
South Korea	Workers' Solidarity	Nodongjayeondae
Spain	Marx21	Marx21
Syria	Syrian Revolutionary Left Current	
Thailand	Socialist Workers Thailand	องค์กรสังคมนิยมแรงงาน
Turkey	Revolutionary Socialist Workers' Party	Devrimci Sosyalist İşçi Partisi
United States	Marx21	
Zimbabwe	International Socialist Organisation	

== Non-aligned IST organisations which hold to its basic positions ==
Country	Organisation name (English)	Organisation name (Country of origin)
Australia	Socialist Alternative	
United Kingdom	Revolutionary Socialism in the 21st Century (RS21)	
United Kingdom	Counterfire	
France	International Socialism (dissolved)	Socialisme International
Germany	Marx21 (Network within The Left)	Marx21 (Network within Die Linke)
Germany	Revolutionary Left (expelled from Marx21 September 2023)	Revolutionäre Linke
Germany	Initiative Socialism from Below (split from Marx21 October 2023)	Initiative Sozialismus von Unten
Greece	Internationalist Workers' Left	Diethnistiki Ergatiki Aristera
New Zealand	International Socialist Organisation	
Puerto Rico	International Socialist Organisation	Organización Socialista Internacional
Scotland	International Socialist Group (dissolved in 2015)	
Serbia	Marks21	
South Africa	International Socialist Movement (South Africa)	
Turkey	Anti-capitalist (dissolved in 2010)	Antikapitalist
United States	International Socialist Organization (dissolved in 2019)	

== Former affiliates ==
These organisations originated in the IST but have significantly changed their political orientation.

Country	Organisation name (English)	Organisation name (Country of origin)
Canada	New Socialist Group (dissolved)	
Germany	Group of International Socialists	Gruppe Internationaler SozialistInnen
United States	Left Turn (dissolved)	
Russia	Socialist Tendency	Социалистическая тенденция

== Defunct ==
Country	Organisation name (English)	Organisation name (Country of origin)
France	What Is To Be Done	Que Faire
Italy	Communism from below	Comunismo dal basso
Norway	International Socialists	Internasjonale Sosialister
Pakistan	International Socialists	
Sweden	International Socialists	Internationella Socialister

== See also ==
- Socialist Worker
- Tony Cliff
- Trotskyism
- Fourth International
- List of Trotskyist internationals
