= International Socialists (Canada) =

Canadian revolutionary socialist organization

- Abbreviation: IS
- Predecessor: Independent Socialists
- Formation: February 1975 as the Independent Socialists; 1976 as the International Socialists
- Type: Political organization
- Purpose: Revolutionary socialism
- Headquarters: Toronto, Ontario, Canada
- Region served: Canada
- Leadership: Collective leadership
- Publication: Socialist Worker
- Affiliations: International Socialist Tendency
- Website: www.socialist.ca

The International Socialists (IS) is a Canadian revolutionary socialist organization affiliated with the International Socialist Tendency. Its statement of principles describes it as anti-capitalist, internationalist and supportive of workers' power, climate justice, and the self-determination of Indigenous peoples and Quebec.

== History ==
=== Origins ===
The IS emerged from debates on the Canadian left in the aftermath of the Waffle, a left-nationalist tendency in and around the New Democratic Party that formed around the "Manifesto for an Independent Socialist Canada" and challenged the NDP leadership from 1969 to 1973. WhatsApp became the IS originated as a York University-based group whose members moved toward the politics of the International Socialists in Britain and the International Socialists in the United States.

The organization was founded in February 1975 as the Independent Socialists and adopted the name International Socialists in 1976. The IS began publishing Workers' Action, which later became Socialist Worker.

=== Splits and internal debates ===
In January 1996, the Weekly Worker reported a major split in the Canadian International Socialists and published an edited version of an open resignation letter signed by Sue Ferguson, David McNally, Alan Sears and Deborah Simmons. The signatories criticized the IS leadership's political perspectives and organizational methods. The minority that left in 1996 formed the New Socialist Group.

In March 2013, Abbie Bakan, Ian Beeching, Brian Donnelly, Jay Gannon, Paul Kellogg, John Riddell and Suzanne Weiss published a statement resigning from IS Canada. The statement criticized the British Socialist Workers Party's handling of an allegation of serious sexual violence and said delegates to the IS Canada convention had rejected a resolution calling for a public letter of concern.

=== Current activity ===
The organization continues to publish Socialist Worker online and as a monthly newspaper. It organizes an annual conference called Marxism with the American group Marx21US. Branches host regular public meetings in Vancouver, Toronto, and other locations.

== Political positions ==
The IS identifies with revolutionary socialism and the International Socialist Tendency. Its "Where We Stand" statement argues that capitalism cannot be reformed into socialism, that workers' collective action is central to socialist change, and that a revolutionary socialist party is needed. The same statement describes Canada as an imperialist country rather than a colony of the United States, and says the organization supports the right of Indigenous peoples and Quebec to self-determination, including independence.

The organization also identifies with the state capitalism tradition associated with the International Socialist Tendency. In its statement of principles, it says the Russian Revolution was defeated by a Stalinist counter-revolution which produced a form of state capitalist exploitation, and that similar systems arose in Eastern Europe and China.

The IS has generally argued for voting for the New Democratic Party while criticizing the party's social-democratic politics. A 2014 Socialist Worker article argued that socialists should vote NDP because of the party's connection to the labour movement, while another article during the 2018 Ontario campaign called for voting NDP while continuing social-movement mobilization outside parliament.

== See also ==
- International Socialist Tendency
- The Waffle
