= Solidarity (Australia) =

- Founded: 1971; 55 years ago, (as Marxist Workers' Group); 2008; 18 years ago, (as Solidarity)
- Ideology: Communism; Marxism; Trotskyism
- International affiliation: International Socialist Tendency

Website
- www.solidarity.net.au

Solidarity is a Trotskyist organisation in Australia. The group is a member of the International Socialist Tendency and has branches in Melbourne, Sydney, Brisbane, Canberra, Adelaide and Perth. The organisation was formed in 2008 from a merger between groups emerging from the International Socialist tradition: the International Socialist Organisation, Socialist Action Group and Solidarity.

Solidarity argues they are "committed to building social movements and the wider left" and "throwing [themselves] into struggles for social justice." They publish a monthly magazine, Solidarity.

== History ==
The Marxist Working Group formed in 1971, then as the Socialist Workers' Action Group (SWAG), and finally the International Socialists (IS), becoming the official representative of the International Socialist Tendency in Australia. The IS expanded from its initial base in Melbourne until it had branches in every major Australian city. The organisation published a paper until 2008 called Socialist Worker.

The IS saw a breakaway faction in the 1980s called Socialist Action led by Tom O'Lincoln and Carole Ferrier which later rejoined the IS. At this point, in 1990, they changed their name to the ISO.

A faction fight beginning in 1993 led to the expulsion of leading ISO members in 1995, mainly but not exclusively in Melbourne, who went on to form Socialist Alternative (SA).

Another period of internal crisis beginning in 2001 led to a loss of members and a further split in 2003 when another grouping of members around former leader Ian Rintoul left to form a group known as Solidarity. Somewhat prior to this O'Lincoln also left, eventually joining Socialist Alternative.

The ISO was a founding component of the Socialist Alliance which grouped together a number of Australian socialist organisations. In 2007, the ISO voted to withdraw its involvement at its national conference, criticising the failure of the project to achieve its intended goals and the role of the Democratic Socialist Perspective in that failure.

On 3 February 2008, the ISO, the ISO splinter group Solidarity, and the Socialist Action Group agreed to merge, with the new organisation to be named Solidarity and based in Sydney. The new Solidarity replaced the ISO as the official representative of the IST in Australia.

== Campaign activity ==
=== During the ISO ===
The organisation had around 300 members at its peak and built a history of supporting militant direct action. It was active in the Right to March campaigns in Brisbane under the Joh Bjelke-Petersen government. The ISO was involved in actions against the rise of the nationalist One Nation party led by Pauline Hanson. They participated in the S11 demonstrations in Melbourne that disrupted a meeting of the World Economic Forum. And some of its own members, including Mick Armstrong, Jill Sparrow and Jeff Sparrow were labeled the Austudy Five after being arrested at a National Union of Students demonstration in Melbourne against the Paul Keating government's proposed abolition of Austudy.

The organisation's main priority from 2003 was to build opposition to the Iraq War and oppose the Australian government's involvement. The group also identified the need to fight Islamophobia and work alongside the Islamic community in Australia.

The ISO argued that the anti-war movement needed to build a broad-based united front against the war. It identified building locality based peace groups, in Brisbane Southside, Moreland, Newtown and Leichhart and the Just Peace group in Perth, as a way of building networks of anti-war activists.

During 2006, the ISO helped organise a national anti-war conference named "Unity for Peace" in an attempt to broaden the anti-war movement's base of support. The conference was the culmination of a speaking tour of the US anti-war activist Cindy Sheehan and Salem Ismael from Doctors for Iraq and was attended by approximately 60 organisations and attracted 350 people.

=== Contemporary ===
==== Refugee rights ====
Solidarity is involved in the refugee rights campaign, and active in organisations such as the Refugee Action Coalition in Sydney that organise demonstrations, meetings and work in trade unions to end mandatory detention and offshore processing. Solidarity is opposed to any form of refugee detention and supports open borders. Solidarity endorsed the 2011 World Refugee Day demonstrations. Ian Rintoul of Solidarity is a spokesperson for the Refugee Action Coalition. Rintoul controversially described Australian Prime Minister Julia Gillard as a "racist" in response to the announcement of the Malaysia solution.

Solidarity has argued that the refugee campaign must engage with supporters and members of the Australian Labor Party and organisations such as Labor4Refugees.

Along with Mark Goudkamp, Sunil Menon, Peter Murphy and John Morris, Ian Rintoul's house was raided by the Australian Federal Police in 2004 in relation to allegations of aiding refugees to obtain "false passports" to avoid deportation. The charges were later dropped due to lack of evidence.

Solidarity student members are involved in campus-based refugee campaign groups, including the Sydney Uni Anti-Racism Collective, the UTS Anti-Racism Club and the Melbourne University Campus Refugee Rights Collective.

==== Education cuts ====
In 2012, Solidarity student members at the University of Sydney actively participated in a mass campaign against proposed staff cuts, playing a central role in initiating the Education Action Group. At its highpoint, the campaign mobilised 1500 students and staff on campus. Solidarity students argued for an escalation of the campaign through walk-outs, student occupations, a blockade of a University Senate meeting and proposed a student strike. As a result of the campaign, the number of proposed academic redundancies was eventually reduced from 100 to 55.

In the months leading up to the announcement of the major cuts, Solidarity members were involved in successful campaigns to prevent staff redundancies and course cuts in the School of Political Economy and the School of Geosciences. The group has also been involved in a campaign to prevent rent-increases at the Sydney University Village (SUV), the campus student housing provider.

In 2005–2007, members the pre-fusion Solidarity - then involved in a broad-left student grouping called 'Keep Left' - had participated in the campaign to prevent the implementation of Voluntary Student Unionism (VSU) at Sydney University.

==== Northern Territory Intervention ====
Solidarity is involved in campaigns to end the Northern Territory Intervention. Solidarity members were involved in a split from the Aboriginal Rights Coalition to the Stop the Intervention Collective Sydney, after a debate over Aboriginal control and identity politics. Solidarity argued that the campaign needed "open, democratic campaign meetings" of Aboriginal and non-Aboriginal activists. The Aboriginal Rights Coalition has now folded. The Stop the Intervention Collective has been involved in campaigning against income management, and calling for jobs with justice for Aboriginal people.

Solidarity member Paddy Gibson is a spokesperson for the Stop the Intervention Collective and a researcher with the Jumbunna Institute of Learning at UTS.

Solidarity has taken the position that the Northern Territory intervention is not primarily driven by a drive for uranium mining in the Northern Territory, but by a government policy of "assimilation", arguing in a debate that the Intervention "is part of a neoliberal, assimilationist ideology that says the only communities that are 'viable' are those that can establish links with the 'real economy'... mining companies gain no greater rights through the "hub towns" policy or the intervention."

==== Climate action ====
Solidarity has been active in the climate change movement and groups such as the Sydney University Climate Action Collective.

Solidarity was opposed to Labor's carbon tax plan. In a factsheet about the carbon tax package released in August 2011, "The truth about the carbon tax", Solidarity argues "the carbon tax package will not cut emissions" and has "given Tony Abbott an enormous free kick" and that there is an "alternative approach taxing the polluters to fund government investment in renewable energy.".

Solidarity has come under some criticism for its arguments against the carbon tax, and their argument that production, rather than lifestyle change, should be the focus of the movement. They initiated and signed a letter in response to comments by Australian Labor Party Member of Parliament Kelvin Thomson that population was responsible for climate change, arguing that "the planning and environmental disasters of our cities are due to government neglect, not population." They have critiqued the Climate Camp protests' focus on coal exports and the model of consensus decision-making used at the camps.

== Politics ==
=== International socialism ===
Solidarity is part of the international socialist tradition and the International Socialist Tendency. The tendency originated with the ideas of Tony Cliff, who split from orthodox Trotskyism by developing a state capitalist critique of the Soviet Union. Cliff also developed an analysis of the post war boom called the permanent arms economy and the theory of deflected permanent revolution which took some issue with Trotsky's theory of permanent revolution in relation the revolutions in China in 1949 and Cuba in 1959, which Cliff argued were not socialist revolutions. Cliff formed what was to become the British Socialist Workers Party and similar organisations spread throughout the world.

=== United front as strategy ===
Solidarity believes that socialists should unite with broader forces beyond the far left in campaigns for social change and subscribe to an interpretation of Leon Trotsky's idea of the "united front". They hold that the united front is a strategy informing basic assumptions about relating to reformist forces, not an organisational tactic that can be selectively applied. The late Bob Gould, described the "common orientation as ... electoral support for the Greens and then Labor under the preferential system and a broader united front tactic towards the ranks of the Greens, the trade unions and the Labor Party," in an article describing the formation of Solidarity.

=== Oppression ===
Solidarity opposes nationalism, racism and all forms of homophobia and sexism. They stand for self-determination for Aboriginal and Torres Strait Islanders. Solidarity claims to stand up for Muslims and Middle Eastern people against the rise in anti-Muslim racism they see as associated with the war on terror.

=== Entryism ===
In December 2018, two NSW Greens MPs accused Solidarity of entryism within the Greens.

== Notable members ==
- Ian Rintoul, spokesperson for Refugee Action Coalition
- Paddy Gibson, anti-Intervention activist, researcher at UTS Jumbunna Institute and associate producer of John Pilger documentary 'Utopia'
- Phil Griffiths, academic and author
- Chris Breen, climate change and union activist
- Anita Creasey, 2013 President, National Union of Students Western Australia
- James Supple, Editor of Solidarity publication

== See also ==
- Socialism in Australia
