= List of political parties in the Soviet Union =

Throughout its existence, the Soviet Union was a one-party state dominated by the Communist Party of the Soviet Union. From 1936, this dominance was formalised under the country's constitution (commonly known as the Stalin Constitution), which established the leading role of the party.

In addition to the central party apparatus (referred to as the "all-Union", or всесоюзный branch of the party), 18 nonconcurrent republic-level branches also existed with autonomous leadership. At the outset, many republic-level parties differed in ideology from the all-Union party, including anti-colonial activists, national communists and Islamic modernists. While these factions were largely destroyed in the Great Purge, republic-level parties maintained different factions and at times different ideologies from their all-Union counterpart.

As part of Mikhail Gorbachev's policies of perestroika, the dominance of the CPSU in politics was gradually diminished through a process of granting further powers to soviets and eventually by the abolition of the leading role of the party. From 1988, various political parties were established, primarily advocating for the autonomy or independence of the republics and increased rights for ethnic minorities.

== Ruling party ==
The Soviet Union was dominated by the Communist Party of the Soviet Union from its foundation; while the Communist Party was originally intended by Vladimir Lenin, leader of the party and first Premier of the Soviet Union, to play a limited role in administration, it increasingly intertwined itself with the bureaucracy of the former Russian Empire and later the Soviet Union. A desire to prevent subversion of party policy by potentially disloyal bureaucrats motivated increased infiltration of the state apparatus by party functionaries, with the usage of state resources to expand the party's presence in rural areas where popular support was nonexistent and in cases where the party's resources were limited. Over time, particularly during Joseph Stalin's rise to power, party officials utilised the ambiguous relation between the party and the bureaucracy to their benefit, and the Soviet Union became a de facto one-party state. The position of the CPSU as the sole ruling party of the Soviet Union was established by the 1936 Constitution of the Soviet Union (commonly known as the Stalin Constitution due to its adoption under the leadership of Joseph Stalin).

With the advent of Mikhail Gorbachev's campaigns of perestroika and glasnost, the leading role of the party and the intersection of party and state positions was gradually dismantled. New state governing organs were established separately from the party (the Congress of People's Deputies and the presidency). Attempts to completely abolish the leading role of the party were originally met with strong opposition from Gorbachev; however, with pressure on the party increasing from the Revolutions of 1989 and the Singing Revolution in the Baltic republics, the republics gradually began abolishing the leading role of the party. These changes increasingly pressured the central party apparatus, in turn, and in February 1990, Gorbachev acquiesced to abolishing the party's supremacy over the state, leading to the establishment of a multi-party system.

The Communist Party of the Soviet Union had autonomous divisions in all republics of the Soviet Union apart from the Russian SFSR. In terms of party organisation, all republic-level parties replicated the structure of the all-Union (Russian: всесоюзный, romanized: vsesoyuznyy) party, with the exception of the position of second secretary. The second secretary traditionally served as the all-Union party apparatus's plenipotentiary to the republic, influencing the party's organisation and policies.

All-Union and republic-level communist parties in the Soviet Union, 1921–1991
Republic	Established	Dissolved	Remarks
All-Union	1912 (Note: As the Russian Communist Party (Bolsheviks).)	1991 (Note: Succeeded by the Communist Party of the Russian Federation.)	Main article: Communist Party of the Soviet Union
Armenia	1920	—N/a (Note: Succeeded by the Armenian Communist Party.)	Main article: Communist Party of Armenia (Soviet Union)
Azerbaijan	1920	—N/a (Note: Succeeded by another party of the same name in 1993.)	Originally a breakaway from the Muslim Social Democratic Party. During the Anglo-Soviet invasion of Iran and the Iran crisis of 1946, the party exerted influence over Soviet-occupied territories, attempting to secure the annexation of Iranian Azerbaijan into the Azerbaijani SSR. Beginning in the 1960s, the party was increasingly dominated by patronage clans, typically favouring migrants from western regions of Azerbaijan. (Note: Residents of the Nakhichevan ASSR and the Yeraz people, originating from Armenia, were among the largest clans.) From 1969, the party was controlled by Heydar Aliyev, who served as the party's First Secretary and later as a member of the all-Union Politburo until being forced to retire by Gorbachev in 1987.
Bukhara (Note: Ruling party of a legally independent state de facto part of the Soviet Union.)	1918	1924	Formed by radical followers of the Jadid movement in the Emirate of Bukhara; overthrew the emirate in 1920. Included the poor as well as members of the clergy and the bourgeois. The party's leadership sought to establish an independent Bukharan nation-state, pursue Islamic modernist policies and develop the economy through state control. While the Uzbek SSR was explicitly the legal heir to Bukhara under Soviet law, the Jadid-aligned members of the party were removed from power.
Byelorussia	1917	2023 (Note: Reformed as the Party of Belarusian Communists, later Belarusian Left Party "A Just World". Dissolved by Supreme Court order in 2023.)	Formed from a split in the Belarusian Socialist Assembly. In its early years, the party was primarily concerned with Bundism factions, with the Bundists being purged as the most significant dissenting faction within the party. Between 1956 and 1980 the party was largely controlled by former Soviet partisans, who oversaw rapid economic development and industrialisation at the same time as Russification. The 1986 Chernobyl disaster, the reveal of the 1937 mass execution of Belarusians and a growth in support for preserving the Belarusian language ultimately resulted in a collapse in support for the party. Through delaying reforms, the party's elites remained in power until 1994.
Estonia	1920	1990	Originally organised as a Leningrad-based subversive group against the Estonian government, with ties to trade unions and leftist members of the Estonian military. The party was banned after a 1924 coup attempt, and most of its underground members fled to the Soviet Union, where they were executed in the Great Purge. During perestroika, the party was divided between hardline Stalinists who sought to preserve the Soviet Union (largely backed by ethnic Russian settlers) and moderate supporters of perestroika, who were generally ethnic Estonians and supported Estonian membership in a Soviet confederation. The former group established the Intermovement in 1988.
Georgia	1921	1991 (Note: Banned.)	Established after the Soviet invasion of Georgia. Initially was involved in the Georgian affair, a dispute in which the party's leadership sought to preserve Georgian autonomy within the Soviet Union. The party was sidelined in 1929 by Stalin, with the justification that its leadership consisted of "nationalist deviationists". From 1953, the party was led by Vasil Mzhavanadze, a supporter of Nikita Khrushchev; Mzhavanadze's rule was marked by widespread corruption, leading to his replacement by Eduard Shevardnadze in 1972. The party was removed from power following the Massacre of Tbilisi; it was banned in 1991 by Zviad Gamsakhurdia after the failure of the coup attempt.
Karelo-Finland	1940	1956	Main article: Communist Party of the Karelo-Finnish Soviet Socialist Republic
Kazakhstan	1936	1991 (Note: Dissolved in September 1991; reestablished in October 1991 by former members, banned in 2015.)	Originally dominated by European settler-colonists, the party made widespread attempts to encourage Kazakhs to join the party, including mullahs and beys; as Kazakh membership increased party organisation became increasingly stratified along ethnic lines. Over time, party membership became dominated by members of the senior jüz, with the First Secretary traditionally being a Kazakh of the senior jüz.
Khorezm	1920	1924	Main article: Communist Party of Khorezm
Kirghizia	1925	1991	Initially marked by disputes over wealth redistribution and whether European concepts of class were applicable to Kyrgyz society; supporters of retaining a pastoralist economy and those expressing the idea that the Kyrgyz were inherently democratic (led by Abdykerim Sydykov) were executed during the Great Purge. The party was defined by rivalries between regional and tribal patronage clans.
Latvia	1904	1991	Main article: Communist Party of Latvia
Lithuania	1918	1991	Main article: Communist Party of Lithuania
Moldavia	1940	1991	Members of the Romanian Communist Party were largely barred from membership due to concerns about their loyalty to the Soviet Union, and membership remained dominated by Russians and Ukrainians. Ethnic Romanians were excluded from politics with the exception of Ivan Bodiul, and elites engaged in wide-reaching corruption. Legally succeeded by the Agrarian Party of Moldova; the Party of Communists of the Republic of Moldova also claims descent from the party.
Tajikistan	1924	—N/a (Note: Banned from 1991 to 1992.)	Initially dominated by national communists and Jadids, most of whom were executed during the Great Purge. Following World War II, the party was dominated by a patronage clan from Leninabad which, unlike other Soviet patronage clans, developed into a familial clan through marriages. They formulated an alliance with the southern Kulobi people against the Pamiri people and the Qurghonteppa Oblast. Attempted marketisation led by the party from 1985 was disastrous, and both patronage and economic failures contributed to the Tajikistani Civil War.
Turkestan	1918	1924	Originally dominated by members of the ethnically Russian former colonial elite of Russian Turkestan. Unable to successfully mount an opposition movement to Russian hegemony, most intellectuals joined the party and some Jadids obtained leading positions, enabling Jadid-inspired reforms.
Turkmenistan	1924	1991	Formed from Turkmen sections of the communist parties of Khorezm, Turkestan and Bukhara. While Turkmen cadres initially were formally placed in leading positions, real power was dominated by Europeans, who were given positions as "dual secretaries" at all levels of bureaucracy and reported to Moscow. Given the lack of a Turkmen proletariat, the party's support base was the peasantry, with theoretical class structures based on those of Russia. Tribalism remained a significant issue throughout the party's existence, and from the 1970s, the Teke tribe dominated the party. Reformed into the Democratic Party of Turkmenistan in 1991.
Ukraine	1918	1991	Established by a series of splits in the Ukrainian Socialist-Revolutionary Party. The party was initially dominated by ideological splits between national communists (generally hailing from the central Dnieper Ukraine), who favoured increased autonomy, and those from southern and eastern Ukraine, who argued that the Ukrainian party's role was to implement the all-Union party's directives. The national communists were killed during the Great Purge. Beginning in the mid-1960s, the party increasingly became dominated by regional patronage clans. (Note: See Dnipropetrovsk Mafia, Kyiv Seven and Donetsk Clan for further information.) Under Petro Shelest (r. 1963–1972), national communism was again pursued before Volodymyr Shcherbytsky abandoned the policy. During the 1989–1991 Ukrainian revolution the party was split between hardliners led by Stanislav Hurenko and national communists led by Leonid Kravchuk. Several parties claimed to succeed the Communist Party of Ukraine, including the Communist Party, the Socialist Party and the Party of Democratic Revival of Ukraine.
Uzbekistan	1925	1991	Established out of the Bukharan and Turkestani communist parties; originally included Jadid sympathisers and anti-colonial activists. Elites from Samarkand and Tashkent dominated the party. Several high-ranking figures were implicated in a wide-reaching corruption scandal during the 1980s and either arrested or died; whether the arrests were motivated by genuine anti-corruption efforts or a desire to crush Uzbek nationalism remains unclear.

=== Factions ===
  - Left Opposition (1923–1933)
  - Workers' Truth (1921–1923)
  - Workers' Group (1923–1930)
  - Right Opposition (1924–1933)
  - United Opposition (1926–1927)
  - Left-Right Bloc (1930)
  - Union of Marxist-Leninists (1932)
  - Bloc of Soviet Oppositions (1932–1933)
  - Anti-Party Group (1957)
  - Soyuz (1990–1991)
  - Bolshevik Platform (1991)
  - State Committee on the State of Emergency (1991)

=== Underground ===
- True Communists (1940)
- Soviet Revolutionary Communists (Bolsheviks) (established in 1960s)
- All-Russian Social-Christian Union for the Liberation of the People (1964–1967)
- Left School (established in Winter 1972–1973, dissolved in January 1977)
- Party of New Communists (established in Winter 1972–1973, dissolved in January 1977)
- Neo-Communist Party of the Soviet Union (established in September 1974, dissolved in January 1985)

=== Legal ===
- Democratic Union (established in March 1988, the first openly proclaimed opposition party in the Soviet Union)
- Liberal Democratic Party of the Soviet Union (established in March 1989, dissolved in April 1992)
- Socialist Party (established in June 1990, dissolved in January-February 1992)

== Pro-independence parties in Union Republics (nationalists) ==
- Organisation of Ukrainian Nationalists (1929–1945, Ukraine)
- National United Party (1966–1987, Armenia)
  - Union for National Self-Determination (1987)

== Political parties in the Post-Soviet states ==
- Armenia
- Azerbaijan
- Belarus
- Estonia
- (Georgia (country)) Georgia
- Kazakhstan
- Kyrgyzstan
- Latvia
- Lithuania
- Moldova
- Russia
- Tajikistan
- Turkmenistan
- Ukraine
- Uzbekistan

== See also ==
- List of political parties in Russia
- Political parties of Russia in 1917

== Bibliography ==
=== Books ===
- Gill, Graeme J. (1994). The Collapse of a Single-Party System: The Disintegration of the Communist Party of the Soviet Union. Cambridge University Press. p. 258. ISBN 0-521-46943-0. LCCN 94-005624.
- Burant, Stephen R. (1991). "The Communist Party". In Zickel, Raymond E. (ed.). Soviet Union: a country study. Area handbook series (2nd ed.). Washington, D.C.: Federal Research Division. pp. 279–327. ISBN 0-8444-0727-5. ISSN 1057-5294. LCCN 90025756.
- Marshall, Alex (2010). The Caucasus Under Soviet Rule. Oxford and New York City: Routledge. p. 387. ISBN 978-0-415-41012-0.
- Cheterian, Vicken (2010). "Azerbaijan". In Ó Beacháin, Donnacha; Polese, Abel (eds.). The Colour Revolutions in the Former Soviet Republics: Successes and failures. London and New York: Routledge. pp. 101–117. ISBN 978-0-203-84895-1. LCCN 2009052578.
- Brisku, Adrian (17 December 2020). "Modern Georgia". In Ludden, David (ed.). Oxford Research Encyclopedia of Asian History. Oxford University Press. p. 22. doi:10.1093/acrefore/9780190277727.013.256.
- Abazov, Rafis (2004). Historical Dictionary of Kyrgyzstan. Asian/Oceanian Historical Dictionaries. Vol. 49. Lanham, Maryland and Oxford: The Scarecrow Press. p. 2003019174. ISBN 0-8108-4868-6.
- Nourzhanov, Kirill; Bleuer, Christian (2013). Tajikistan: A Political and Social History. Canberra: ANU Press. p. 404. ISBN 9781925021165. JSTOR j.ctt5hgxx8.
- Edgar, Adrienne Lynn (2004). Tribal Nation: The Making of Soviet Turkmenistan. Princeton University Press. p. 296. doi:10.1515/9781400844296. ISBN 978-0-691-12799-6. LCCN 2004043423.
- D'Anieri, Paul; Kravchuk, Robert; Kuzio, Taras (1999). Politics And Society In Ukraine. New York and Abingdon, Oxon: Westview Press, Taylor and Francis. ISBN 978-0-8133-3538-4. LCCN 99-30503.

=== Journal articles ===
- Nikandrov, Andrey Vsevolodovich (2022). Государство диктатуры пролетариата или всенародное государство: государственный строй СССР в советское политическое мысли сталинской эпохи [The state of the dictatorship of the proletariat or the state of all the people: the state system of the USSR in the Soviet political thought of the Stalin era]. Tomsk State University Journal of Philosophy, Sociology and Political Science (in Russian). 67: 159–172. doi:10.17223/1998863X/67/15.
- Raine, F. (2001). "Stalin and the Creation of the Azerbaijan Democratic Party in Iran, 1945". Cold War History. 2 (1): 1–38. doi:10.1080/713999940. eISSN 1743-7962. ISSN 1468-2745.
- Ataşer, Gökhan Alper (2025). "Clan Politics in Azerbaijan: A Critical Overview". International Social Sciences Journal. 11 (2): 208–212. doi:10.5281/zenodo.14937698. eISSN 2587-1587.
- Sloin, Andrew (Winter 2014). "The Politics of Crisis: Economy, Ethnicity, and Trotskyism in Belorussia". Kritika: Explorations in Russian and Eurasian History. 15 (1): 49–74. eISSN 1538-5000. ISSN 1531-023X.
- Marples, David R. (1999). "National awakening and national consciousness in Belarus". Nationalities Papers. 27 (4). doi:10.1080/009059999108830. eISSN 1465-3923. ISSN 0090-5992.
- Sanford, George (1997). "Nation, state and independence in Belarus". Contemporary Politics. 3 (3): 225–245. doi:10.1080/13569779708449928. eISSN 1469-3631. ISSN 1356-9775.
- Kudukhov, Kirill Sergeyevich (2011). Деятельность Совета интернациональной пропаганды на Востоке в 1920 г. Итоговый доклад [Activities of the Council for International Propaganda in the Orient in 1920: Final report]. Oriental Archive (in Russian). 1 (23): 61–67 – via Cyberleninka.
- Khalid, Adeeb (2010). "The Bukharan People's Soviet Republic in the Light of Muslim Sources". Die Welt des Islams. 50 (3/4): 335–361. doi:10.1163/157006010x544287. eISSN 1570-0607. ISSN 0043-2539. JSTOR 41105359.
- Forgus, Silvia P. (1992). "Soviet subversive activities in independent Estonia (1918–1940)". Journal of Baltic Studies. 23 (1): 29–46. doi:10.1080/01629779100000261. eISSN 1751-7877. ISSN 0162-9778.
- Parming, Tönu (July 1981). "The Pattern of Participation of the Estonian Communist Party in National Politics, 1918–1940". The Slavonic and East European Review. 59 (3): 397–412. eISSN 2222-4327. ISSN 0037-6795. JSTOR 4208320.
- Taagepera, Rein (Summer 1989). "Estonia in September 1988: Stalinists, centrists and restorationists". Journal of Baltic Studies. 20 (2): 175–190. doi:10.1080/01629778900000061. eISSN 1751-7877. ISSN 0162-9778. JSTOR 43212906.
- Smith, Jeremy (May 1998). "The Georgian Affair of 1922—Policy Failure, Personality Clash or Power Struggle?". Europe-Asia Studies. 50 (3): 519–544. doi:10.1080/09668139808412550. eISSN 1465-3427. ISSN 0966-8136. JSTOR 153383.
- Allison, Lincoln; Kukhianidze, Alexander; Matsaberidze, Malkhaz; Dolidze, Valeri (1996). "Problems of democratization in the republic of Georgia". Democratization. 3 (4): 517–529. doi:10.1080/13510349608403493. eISSN 1743-890X. ISSN 1351-0347.
- Lane, David (April 1975). "Ethnic and Class Stratification in Soviet Kazakhstan, 1917–39". Comparative Studies in Society and History. 17 (2): 165–189. doi:10.1017/s0010417500007738. eISSN 1471-633X. ISSN 0010-4175.
- Melvin, Neil (November 1993). "Russia and the Ethno-Politics of Kazakhstan". The World Today. 49 (11): 208–210. eISSN 2059-7495. ISSN 0043-9134. JSTOR 40396453.
- Chokobaeva, Aminat (2015). "Socialist Promises, Ethnography and the Building of a Kyrgyz Soviet Nation". Asiatische Studien - Études Asiatiques. 69 (3): 543–561. doi:10.1515/asia-2015-1005. eISSN 2235-5871. ISSN 0004-4717.
- Crowther, William (April 1991). "The Politics of Ethno-National Mobilization: Nationalism and Reform in Soviet Moldavia". The Russian Review. 50 (2): 183–202. doi:10.2307/131158. eISSN 1467-9434. ISSN 0036-0341. JSTOR 131158.
- Foroughi, Payam (2002). "Tajikistan: Nationalism, Ethnicity, Conflict, and Socio-economic Disparities—Sources and Solutions". Journal of Muslim Minority Affairs. 22 (1): 39–61. doi:10.1080/13602000220124827. eISSN 1469-9591. ISSN 1360-2004.
- Akbarzadeh, Sharam (1996). "Why Did Nationalism Fail in Tajikistan?". Europe-Asia Studies. 48 (7): 1105–1129. doi:10.1080/09668139608412402. eISSN 1465-3427. ISSN 0966-8136.
- Bochkarayeva, Irina Borisovna (2016). Туркестанская комиссия ВЦИК и национальный вопрос в ТуркАССР (1920 г. ) [The Turkestani Commission of the VTsIK and the national question in the TurkASSR (1920)]. Altai State University News: 43–47. doi:10.14258/izvasu(2016)2-06 – via Cyberleninka.
- Sartori, Paolo (2016). "Ijtihād in Bukhara: Central Asian Jadidism and Local Genealogies of Cultural Change". Journal of the Economic and Social History of the Orient. 59 (1/2): 193–236. doi:10.1163/15685209-12341397. eISSN 1568-5209. ISSN 0022-4995. JSTOR 43919272.
- Akbarzadeh, Shahram (June 1999). "National Identity and Political Legitimacy in Turkmenistan". Nationalities Papers. 27 (2): 271–290. doi:10.1080/009059999109064. eISSN 1465-3923. ISSN 0090-5992.
- Edgar, Adrienne L. (Summer 2001). "Genealogy, Class, and "Tribal Policy" in Soviet Turkmenistan, 1924–1934". Slavic Review. 60 (2): 266–288. doi:10.2307/2697271. eISSN 2325-7784. ISSN 0037-6779. JSTOR 2697271.
- Kibita, Nataliya (2025). "The Communist Party of Ukraine in the Final Years of the Soviet Union: From Transformation to Disintegration". Europe-Asia Studies. 77 (10): 1711–1735. doi:10.1080/09668136.2025.2556815. eISSN 1465-3427. ISSN 0966-8136.
- Merlo, Simona (2021). "The Communist party and informal groups in ukraine during perestroika (1985-1989): An unambiguous relationship?". Cahiers du monde russe. 62 (4): 629–654. doi:10.4000/monderusse.12689. eISSN 1777-5388. ISSN 1252-6576.
- Starr, S. Frederick (June 2006). "Clans, Authoritarian Rulers, and Parliaments in Central Asia". Silk Road Papers. Central Asia-Caucasus Institute: 26. ISBN 91-85473-15-4.
- Gleason, Gregory (1990). "Nationalism or organized crime? The Case of the 'Cotton Scandal' in the USSR". Corruption and Reform. 5: 87–108 – via ResearchGate.
