= Alexander Tarasov =

Russian sociologist, writer, and philosopher (born 1958)

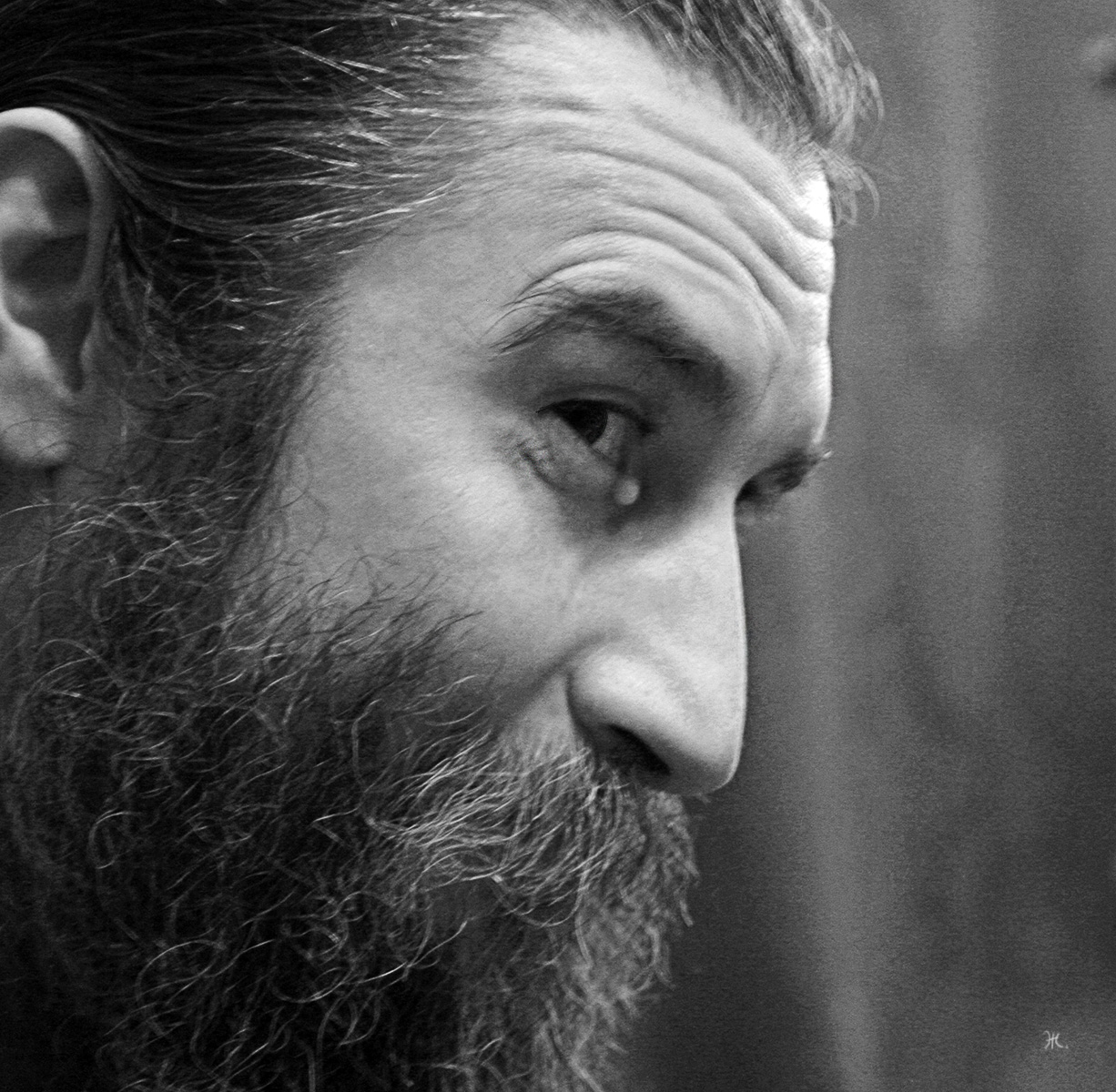
- Born: March 8, 1958 (age 68); Moscow, Russian SFSR, Soviet Union

Philosophical work
- Era: Contemporary philosophy
- Region: Western philosophy Russian philosophy
- Main interests: Politics, sociology, culture, philosophy
- Website: saint-juste.narod.ru

Alexander Nikolaevich Tarasov (Russian: Алекса́ндр Никола́евич Тара́сов; born March 8, 1958) is a Soviet and Russian left-wing sociologist, political scientist, culturologist, publicist, writer, and philosopher. Up until the beginning of the 21st century he referred to himself as a Post-Marxist alongside István Mészáros and a number of Yugoslav Marxist philosophers who belonged to Praxis School and emigrated to London. Since in the 21st century the term Post-Marxism has been appropriated by Ernesto Laclau, Chantal Mouffe and their followers, Alexander Tarasov (together with the above-mentioned István Mészáros and Yugoslav philosophers) stopped referring to himself as a Post-Marxist.

== Early political activity and arrest ==
Between December 1972 and January 1973 Tarasov, together with Vasily Minorsky, founded a clandestine radical left group called the "Party of New Communists" (PNC) (Russian: Партия новых коммунистов (ПНК)), and became the group's informal leader in the summer of 1973. In 1974 PNC merged with another clandestine radical left group called "Left School" (Russian: Левая школа) to form the "Neo-Communist Party of the Soviet Union" (NCPSU) (Russian: Неокоммунистическая партия Советского Союза (НКПСС)). Tarasov became one of the NCPSU leaders and theorists, writing the party program, The Principles of Neo-communism (Russian: Принципы неокоммунизма) in 1974. The KGB arrested him in 1975. Upon preliminary imprisonment and a yearlong confinement in a special psychiatric hospital he was released as the NCPSU case was never brought to trial. In the psychiatric hospital Tarasov was subjected to cruel treatment and (de facto) torture (beatings, ETC – electroconvulsive therapy, induced hypoglycemia, injection of large doses of neuroleptics) all resulting in severe somatic disorders, which Tarasov has been suffering from since his release, leaving him virtually disabled (hypertonia, Ankylosing Spondylitis, liver and pancreas diseases). After his release, Tarasov participated in restoration of NCPSU, which he had led until its self-dissolution in January 1985. In 1988, two State Psychiatric Commissions examined Tarasov and found him completely psychologically healthy. (Also read: Political abuse of psychiatry in the Soviet Union)

== Education and professional activities ==
Tarasov held many different jobs: he worked as a draughtsman; laboratory assistant in a design institute; graveyard warden at Vagankovo Cemetery (Moscow); machinist; boiler technician; librarian; editor; feldsher; gas boiler operator; bookkeeper at the Central Warehouse of Mikoyan Meat Processing Plant Corp.; light board operator at Moscow Hermitage Theatre (located in Moscow Hermitage Garden); research associate at the Centre for Scientific Analysis (Russian Academy of Sciences); university teacher; consultant for the Ministry of Education and Science; political columnist; expert at Information Research Centre "Panorama" and Moscow Human Rights Committee; etc. He got a degree in economics from All-Russian State Distance Learning Institute of Finance and Economics and a degree in history (started at the Moscow State Pedagogical University and finished at Lomonosov Moscow State University). When "perestroika" started, he soon firmly positioned himself as a professional sociologist and political scientist.

== Publishing and literary activity ==
In 1984 Tarasov started publishing his works (under a pseudonym) in the USSR ("samizdat") and in foreign press. In 1988, his articles started appearing (under pseudonyms) in independent press and from 1990 he has been publishing his works in independent and official press under his own name.

In 1988 he founded the "Independent Archive" (from 1990: "Independent Archive – Independent Sociological Service") and in 1991 he became an associate at the Centre for New Sociology and the Study of Applied Politics "Phoenix" (Russian: Центр новой социологии и изучения практической политики "Феникс"). In 2004, he became a co-director of "Phoenix" and, in February 2009, its director.

In the first half of 1993 Tarasov was one of the three editors of a monthly magazine called The House of the Unions, published by the same team as Solidarnost (Russian: Солидарность (Solidarity), the newspaper founded by the Moscow Federation of Trade Unions (MFP) (currently the newspaper of the Federation of Independent Trade Unions of Russia). The magazine had a circulation of 30,000. In his address to the readers of the first issue A.Tarasov has noted that The House of the Unions makes it its mission to "update Socialist thought" and "create a theory that matches current reality." After just five issues the magazine was closed down by Andrey Isaev, Editor in Chief of "Solidarnost", for non-conforming to the political line of MFP, i.e. for "excessive" radicalism.

In the second half of 1993 Tarasov was a member of the editorial board of the newspaper The Working Class Action; in 1993–1994 – a member of the editorial board of a counterculture magazine Vugluskr (Russian: Вуглускр); in the mid-1990s – political adviser for a radical student union "Students' Advocacy".

Tarasov has penned more than 1100 publications in sociology (mainly on youth studies, education issues and conflict resolution); politology (current politics, political radicalism in Russia and abroad, mass social movements); history (history and theory of revolutionary movement and guerrilla warfare); culturology (popular culture issues, intercultural and inter-civilization contradictions); economics(comparative research). He is also a literary and movie critic (modern literature and cinema, popular culture and politics, history and theory of the cinematography of the 1960s and 1970s). He has been the first to study and describe Nazi-skinhead subculture in Russia. A.Tarasov is the author of the first profound research on the influence of far-right ideas and organizations on the subculture of football fans in Russia (November 2009 – January 2010).

In 2002 he was one of the founders, compilers and a scientific editor of a book series Zero Hour: Contemporary World Anti-Bourgeois Thought (Russian: "Час "Ч". Современная мировая антибуржуазная мысль" – "Gilea" Publishing House). He followed this with two additional book series: Class Struggle (German: Klassenkampf; co-edited with Boris Yuliyevich Kagarlitsky – "Ultra.Culture" Publishing House) in 2005, and The Rose of the Revolution (Russian: "роЗА РЕВОлюций") in 2006 ("Cultural Revolution" Publishing House). These series include modern left-wing socio-political literature (mainly foreign).

In addition to contributing to compiling and editing of these series, Tarasov takes on the role of a science editor and commentator on the works of famous left-wing thinkers: Leon Trotsky, Alain Badiou, Cornelius Castoriadis to name a few.

== As a target of violence in post-Soviet Russia ==
On November 4, 1995, Tarasov was the victim of an unprovoked assault near his house: after calling him by name, unknown attackers beat him so severely that he lost consciousness (although he tried to defend himself). The attackers escaped with his passport, but did not take a large sum of money and valuables. Police opened a criminal investigation into the assault, but the attackers have never been found.

In 2008, neo-Nazis included A. Tarasov on the list of their enemies who must be physically exterminated. The list was published on radical right-wing sites.

In 2011, the Russian pro-Kremlin group "Nashi" named Tarasov among "168 most loathsome enemies" of the group's leader Vasily Yakemenko and of Vladimir Putin's regime.

== Political differences with contemporary dissenters ==
Tarasov is known among Russian anarchists as a consistent critic, primarily of the practice of anarchism as fruitless and unpromising, and, to some extent, of its theory as outdated and unscientific. Tarasov's criticism has caused open animosity towards him among anarchists.

Tarasov's reaction to 2011–2012 Russian protests was negative. He criticized the protests from the left, considering them to be the movement of petit bourgeoisie and "consumers' rebellion" alien to the goals and objectives of left-wing forces in Russia and irrelevant to the revolutionary struggle against capitalism.

Between 2002 and 2012 Tarasov actively participated (behind the scene) in publication of the Scepsis journal (Russian: Скепсис), also contributing to its online version (from May 2003). He was responsible for some of the publications on the journal's website, collaborated with authors and translators as an editor and a curator. He had a noticeable influence on the political and theoretical stance of the journal, which is evident in the journal's and the website's mission statement, documenting some of Tarasov's theoretical ideas, such as: defining the bureaucrat-bourgeoisie as the ruling class of modern Russia; characterization of Russia as a society of degrading peripheral capitalism; distinguishing between the concepts of "intellectuals" and "intelligentsia"; recognition of the rudimentary level of the left movement in Russia, etc. In addition, the mission statement of Scepsis contains references to five of Tarasov's writings. It is also known that A. Tarasov was one of the authors of the Scepsis's manifesto entitled "Do Not Fall into the Same Trap!" and dedicated to the "Bolotnaya" protests of 2011. His input into the manifesto was the idea of the necessity to organise grassroots "clusters of resistance... at work, at school, and in the neighbourhoods".

In 2012 A. N. Tarasov left the Scepsis due to ideological and political differences with the majority of its editorial board members, most of whom were the students and followers of Yuri Semenov. Tarasov's departure was preceded by his public polemics with Semenov.

== Recognition and awards ==
Tarasov is an accomplished prose and poetry writer (since 1992). He is also a translator from English and Spanish (since 1997). Tarasov's works have been published, apart from Russia, in the US, Canada, United Kingdom, France, Germany, Netherlands, Switzerland, Sweden, Norway, Italy, Spain, Greece, Finland, Hungary, Czech Republic, Serbia, India, Japan, South Korea, Thailand, Singapore, Argentina, Cuba, Panama, South Africa, Morocco, Réunion, New Zealand, Estonia, Latvia, Lithuania, Belarus, Ukraine, Kazakhstan, Moldova, Georgia, Azerbaijan, as well as in unrecognized Transnistria and Donetsk People's Republic. He is a laureate of the prizes of several literary magazines: "Druzhba Narodov" (Fraternity of Peoples, Russian: «Дружба Народов» (2000), "Yunost" (Youth, Russian: «Юность» (2001) and "Oktyabr'" (October, Russian: «Октябрь» (2011).

Since 2014 Tarasov's profile has been included in annual editions of Marquis Who's Who in the World.

== Books ==
- "Провокация. Версия событий 3–4 октября 1993 г. в Москве". – М.: Центр новой социологии и изучения практической политики "Феникс", 1993. ("The Provocation. A Version of Events in Moscow on October 3–4, 1993". – Moscow: Center for New Sociology and Research in Applied Politics "Phoenix", 1993)
- "Правда о Югославии". — Пермь: ОПОР, 1993. ("The Truth About Yugoslavia". — Perm': OPOR, 1993 (co-author)
- "Провокация. Версия событий 3–4 октября 1993 г. в Москве. — Постскриптум из 1994–го". — М.: Центр новой социологии и изучения практической политики "Феникс", 1994. ("The Provocation. A Version of Events in Moscow on October 3–4, 1993. — Post scriptum from 1994". — Moscow: Center for New Sociology and Research in Applied Politics "Phoenix", 1994)
- "Политический экстремизм в России". — М.: Информационно-экспертная группа "Панорама", 1996. ("Political Extremism in Russia". — Moscow: Information-expert group "Panorama", 1996 (co-author)
- "Политический экстремизм в России". — М.: Институт экспериментальной социологии, 1996. ("Political Extremism in Russia". — Moscow: Institute of Experimental Sociology, 1996 (co-author). ISBN 5-87637-043-6
- "Левые в России: от умеренных до экстремистов". — М.: Институт экспериментальной социологии, 1997. ("The Left Wing in Russia: From Moderate to Extremists". — Moscow: Institute of Experimental Sociology, 1997 (co-author). ISBN 5-87637-006-1
- "Очень своевременная повесть. Феминистка как стриптизёрша: культурологический анализ". — М.: Издательство Академии Искусства и Науки XXI века "Норма", 1999. ("A Very Timely Novel. A Feminist as a Stripper: Culturological Analysis". — Moscow: "Norma" Publishing House (the Academy of 21st Century Art and Science), 1999). ISBN 5-85302-194-X
- "Революция не всерьёз. Штудии по теории и истории квазиреволюционных движений". — Екатеринбург: "Ультра.Культура", 2005. ("Not A Serious Revolution. Study of the Theory and History of Quasi-Revolutionary Movements". — Yekaterinburg: "Ultra.Culture" Publishing House, 2005). ISBN 5-9681-0067-2
- "Страна Икс". — М.: АСТ; Адаптек, 2006. ("Country X". — Moscow: AST; Adaptek, 2006. ISBN 5-17-032525-8; 2nd edition: 2007, ISBN 5-17-040213-9)
- "Le rouge et le noir. Extrême droite et nationalisme en Russie". ("The Red and the Black: The Extreme Right and Nationalism in Russia") — Paris: CNRS Éditions, 2007 (co-author). ISBN 978-2-271-06505-6.
- "XX əsr radikalı üçün Erix Fromm irsi. — Fromm E. Marksın insan konsepsiyası". — Bakı: Solfront, 2012. (Fromm E. "Marx's Concept of Man". Tarasov A. "The Legacy of Erich Fromm for a Radical of the End of XX – Beginning of XXI Century". — Baku: Solfront, 2012). ISBN 978-9952-444-73-5.
