= Magnat (disambiguation) =

Magnat(e) may refer to:

- Magnate, in particular
  - Magnates of Poland and Lithuania
- Business magnate
- Magnat (surname)
- Magnat (film), 1987 Polish historical film
- Magnat, audiosystem brand by Audiovox
- Magnat, beer brand by Dojlidy Brewery
- Magnat, beer brand by Obolon CJSC

== See also ==
- Magnat-l'Étrange, commune in France
- Magnate (singer), part of the Puerto Rican duo Magnate & Valentino. Also a solo singer
