= Natalia Magnat =

Russian translator and author (1954–1997)

- Born: 5 November 1954; Moscow, Soviet Union
- Died: 18 October 1997 (aged 42)

Philosophical work
- School: Marxism
- Main interests: Marxism, translation, aesthetics, culture, philosophy

Natalia Yakovlevna Magnat (Russian: Ната́лья Я́ковлевна Магна́т; November 5, 1954 – October 18, 1997) was a Soviet and Russian translator of English, author of works on literary criticism and aesthetics, leader of underground leftist organizations "Left School" (Russian: Левая школа) and "Neo-Communist Party of the Soviet Union" (NCPSU) (Russian: Неокоммунистическая партия Советского Союза (НКПСС)).

== Biography ==
Natalia Magnat was born in a family of a violinist and a pediatrician. She graduated from the Moscow State Pedagogical University as a teacher of English and German languages. In the late 1970s - early 1980s she worked in SIC Informkultura (Scientific Information Center for Culture and Arts). After the beginning of perestroika she became professionally engaged in translation of fiction. She has translated, among others, works of: Aldous Huxley, Henry Kuttner, Roger Zelazny, Douglas Adams, Glen Cook, George R. R. Martin, Jack Vance, Gordon R. Dickson, A. Bertram Chandler, Connie Willis, Roger MacBride Allen, Terry Brooks, Michael Swanwick, Paul Di Filippo. Many works, translated by her, went through multiple printings.

== Underground political activities ==
In December 1972 — January 1973 Magnat, together with fellow students Olga Barash and Inna Okup, founded a clandestine radical left group called "Left School", in which she took effective leadership by becoming the group's theorist. In September 1974 "Left School" has merged with another underground leftist group — "Party of New Communists" (PNC) (Russian: Партия новых коммунистов (ПНК)). The new organization adopted the name "Neo-Communist Party of the Soviet Union" (NCPSU). Magnat joined the interim governing body of NCPSU — "the leading five", taking on the overall management and part of the theoretical work (questions of aesthetics). Works on revolutionary aesthetics, written by Magnat during that period, have not survived — all written materials had to be burnt together with the entire archive of NCPSU in January 1975. When the party's Moscow section, originating from PNC, was destroyed by KGB in January 1975 (following the arrest of some of the party's key members), Natalia Magnat took over the leadership of the surviving part of the organization. She led the party into even deeper hiding, thus saving it from complete annihilation. Restoration of the party began in 1977–1978.

== Illness and death ==
It's likely that severe, prolonged stress she suffered as a result of these events, has triggered a serious illness — Crohn's disease. In subsequent years she underwent two serious surgical operations to remove the affected parts of large intestine, but ultimately died, unable to raise money for another operation.
