= Left School =

Left School Левая школа
- Leader: Natalia Magnat; Olga Barash; Inna Okup
- Founded: December 1972-January 1973
- Dissolved: January 1977
- Succeeded by: Neo-Communist Party of the Soviet Union
- Headquarters: Moscow, Russian SFSR, USSR
- Newspaper: Left School
- Ideology: Communism; Marxism-Leninism; Trotskyism; Atheist existentialism New Left
- Political position: Far-left
- National affiliation: Neo-Communist Party of the Soviet Union (1974-1977)

The Left School (Russian: Левая школа; Levaya shkola) was a clandestine radical left organization, founded in Moscow in December 1972 - January 1973. The Left School is seen by modern researchers as one of the first organizations of the New Left in the Soviet Union.

== Origins and early years ==
The group was founded by Natalia Magnat, Olga Barash and Inna Okup, and consisted almost completely of the students of Moscow State Pedagogical University.

Natalia Magnat was a recognized theorist of the group, while Olga Barash was in charge of organizational work. The Left School did not have a formal leadership, but objectively, its three founders took the lead. As the group grew, its members were planning to hold a congress or a conference in the second half of 1976. It had been expected that the congress would elect the group's leaders, discuss and adopt the charter and the program, as well as, possibly, choose a new name (the name "Left School" was seen as temporary and chosen, mainly, for reasons of secrecy).

The organization's members planned to publish an underground magazine to be called Left School, but this project had not been implemented. In the summer of 1973 members of the Left School made an attempt to create subsidiary groups in Ukraine, but it was unsuccessful.

In September 1973 the Left School established contact with another underground radical left organization called The Party of New Communists (PNC) (Russian: Партия новых коммунистов (ПНК)), whose ideological principles and political goals were extremely close to those of the Left School. After long negotiations both groups had come to a merger agreement, which was formally executed in September 1974. The merged organization was called the Neo-Communist Party of the Soviet Union (NCPSU; Russian: Неокоммунистическая партия Советского Союза, НКПСС). Natalia Magnat and Olga Barash joined the group of NCPSU's informal leaders.

At the same time Natalia Magnat had surrendered the role of the primary ideological theorist to a former member of PNC Alexander Tarasov. As of now she was mainly concentrating on questions of esthetics.

== Later years ==
In spite of the formal integration with PNC, viable joint activities were not established in the beginning. As a consequence, when Moscow group of PNC (including its leaders) was arrested by the KGB in January 1975, the unaffected former members of the Left School led by N. Magnat and O. Barash, managed to preserve NCPSU from complete breakdown through increased secrecy. They successfully kept the organization alive deep underground up until 1977, when arrested NCPSU leaders were released to freedom and began to revive the party. Thus, although formally ceased to exist in September 1974, in reality the Left School acted as an independent clandestine group right up to January 1977.

== Political theory ==
Theoretical foundations of the Left School combined elements of classic Marxism, Leninism, Trotskyism, and French atheist existentialism (primarily, Jean-Paul Sartre, Albert Camus and Antoine de Saint-Exupéry).

The political regime which existed in the Soviet Union was seen by the Left School as anti-socialist and petty bourgeois (philistine and bureaucratic by nature). A power grab by Joseph Stalin's faction within the All-Union Communist Party (bolsheviks) and the Soviet government in the late 1920s and early 1930s was thought to be the reason this regime was established. Stalin's supporters expressed the interests of counter-revolutionary forces and its regime was seen by the Left School as socially futile, condemning the country to cultural and social stagnation, holding back personal development of the Soviet citizens, imposing primitivism, depriving people of political initiative and the right to participate in public affairs, driving the most talented people to escapism (alcoholism, religion) and, ultimately, to emigration.

The Left School never questioned the socialist nature of the USSR's economy; consequently, the social order of the Soviet Union was defined as "perverse socialism". To rectify the situation it would be enough to perform a political revolution which would bring the political order in line with the economic order, thus eliminating "the perversion". Such revolution was viewed by the members of the Left School as a "socialist democratic revolution" by analogy with bourgeois-democratic revolutions. The organization's members believed that the sociocultural dead-end, brought upon the USSR by the ruling bourgeois bureaucracy, would inevitably result in economic crisis in the context of scientific and technical revolution. This would be due to antagonism between bourgeois bureaucracy and creativity that would lead to a revolutionary situation. It was Natalia Magnat's projection that this would happen by the end of the 20th century. For the revolution to be successful it would be crucial that a revolutionary party would be formed in the country, a party which could take the lead in the revolution. The Left School saw itself as an "embryo" of such a party.

Intelligentsia and, in particular, students, were thought fit to become the revolutionary subject of the "socialist democratic revolution". But it was the working class which was deemed to be the grassroots basis of the revolution, being a class, that suffered most from the alienation, a class that would be most afflicted by the future economic crisis.

== Literature ==
- Тарасов А. Н., Черкасов Г. Ю., Шавшукова Т. В., Левые в России: от умеренных до экстремистов. — М.: Институт экспериментальной социологии, 1997. (Tarasov, A., Cherkasov, G., Shavshukova, T., The Left Wing in Russia: From Moderate to Extremists. — Moscow: Institute of Experimental Sociology, 1997). ISBN 5-87637-006-1
- Тарасов А. Н., Революция не всерьёз. Штудии по теории и истории квазиреволюционных движений. — Екатеринбург: "Ультра.Культура", 2005. (Tarasov, A., Not A Serious Revolution. Study of the Theory and History of Quasi-Revolutionary Movements. — Yekaterinburg: "Ultra.Culture" Publishing House, 2005). ISBN 5-9681-0067-2
- Roßbach K., Kontrkulttuuri Neuvostoliittossa: hippien ja neokommunistien välillä., Sosiaalinen arkkisto, 1995, No.1.
- Fäldin H., Neokommunistiska partiet. Okänd sida av Sovjetunionens vänster oppositions historiens. Medborgaren, 1994, No.12.
