= Magnat (surname) =

Magnat is a surname. Notable people with the surname include:

- Julien Magnat, film and television screenwriter and director
- Joseph Magnat, a founder of Magnat-Debon (1893-1962), a manufacturer of French motorcycles and scooters (fr:Magnat-Debon)
- Natalia Magnat (1954-1997), Soviet dissident
