= Neo-Communist Party of the Soviet Union =

Former Russian political party

Neo-Communist Party of the Soviet Union Неокоммунистическая партия Советского Союза
- Abbreviation: NCPSU (English); НКПСС (Russian)
- Leader: Natalia Magnat; Olga Barash
- Founders: Alexander Tarasov; Natalia Magnat; Vasily Minorsky; Olga Barash; Igor Dukhanov
- Founded: September 1974
- Dissolved: January 1985
- Merger of: Left School; Party of New Communists
- Headquarters: Moscow, Russian SFSR, USSR
- Membership (1974): 32
- Ideology: Eurocommunism; Atheist existentialism Communism; Guevarism; Neo-Marxism; Anti-clericalism; Trotskyism; New Left
- Political position: Far-left
- Colours: Red

The Neo-Communist Party of the Soviet Union (NCPSU; Russian: Неокоммунистическая партия Советского Союза; НКПСС; Neokommunisticheskaya partiya Sovetskogo Soyuza, NKPSS) was a clandestine far-left group, which existed in the Soviet Union between September 1974 and January 1985. NCPSU is seen by modern researchers as one of the first organizations of the New Left in the USSR. However, Austrian researcher Hans Azenbaum, who studied the ideology of NCPSU, tends to view this party as the one focusing on the "third way", i.e. neither capitalism, nor real socialism.

== History ==
The party was the result of a merger of two clandestine radical left groups: Party of New Communists (PNC) (Russian: Партия новых коммунистов (ПНК)) and "Left School" (Russian: Левая школа), which were formed simultaneously, but independently from each other in December 1972 - January 1973. Members of the two groups established contact in September 1973 and the possibility of a merger was broached in May 1974, but it was not until September 1974 that the groups joined forces.

After the merger, the two groups ideologically enriched each other through bringing together the ideas of Trotskyism and the New Left (mainly Herbert Marcuse, Che Guevara and Régis Debray) by PNC and the ideas of French atheist existentialism (essentially, Jean-Paul Sartre, Albert Camus and Antoine de Saint-Exupéry) by the "Left School".

NCPSU members were planning to hold a founding congress in January 1977 (with July as a fallback). It had been expected that the congress would elect the party's governing body - Central Committee, discuss and adopt the Charter and the Programme of NCPSU. Prior to that "The Principles of Neo-communism" (Russian: Принципы неокоммунизма) - written by Alexander Tarasov in November 1973 and adapted in May–June 1974 at the request of the "Left School" for the newly created organization - were accepted by its members as a temporary theoretical document of NCPSU.

These plans were nevertheless disrupted by the failure of 1975 and the events of April 1977. The founding congress of NCPSU never took place.

In September 1974, "the leading five" became a temporary governing and coordinating body of NCPSU (pending the election of its Central Committee), including Alexander Tarasov (theory, general leadership); Natalia Magnat (theory, general leadership); Vasily Minorsky (activity within technical universities and colleges and counterculture circles); Olga Barash (activity within liberal arts universities and colleges and translating); Igor Dukhanov (communication with regional groups, provision of security).

In 1977 Igor Dukhanov was replaced by S.Trubkin in "the leading five". All decisions of "the leading five" outside of their areas of competence were made collectively by majority vote.

In 1975 NCPSU was struck by a failure: KGB identified and arrested several members of the Moscow section of the party, including some leaders, but the extent of the failure has been limited only to former members of PNC: in spite of formal integration, the two groups were (de facto) still independent and connections between them were weak.

KGB investigators failed to prove any connection between former PNC members and the other half of NCPSU (former "Left School"), as well as their connections with regional groups. They also failed to get convincing proof of serious anti-Soviet activity (partially, because NCPSU archive, previously kept in the village of Valentinovka, Moscow Oblast, has been destroyed in January 1975). During the investigation, arrested members of NCPSU claimed that they mainly upheld the ideas of Marxism–Leninism, considered to be the official ideology of the USSR, while some evasion towards Trotskyism, anarchism and existentialism cannot be a crime, because in the USSR one cannot be tried for their views, but only for their actions. As a result, the NCPSU case was never brought to trial. Several "most dangerous" party members (from the KGB's point of view) were confined - extrajudicially - in special psychiatric hospitals for periods ranging from six months to one year (Also read: Political abuse of psychiatry in the Soviet Union). The rest were excluded from their universities and from Komsomol.

Limited scale of 1975 failure proved that NCPSU was largely clandestine. The organization had a system of passwords and post boxes for connecting with regional groups; all NCPSU members had noms de guerre. Letters to regions were written with invisible ink.

After the failure of 1975, NCPSU activity was practically paralyzed. Unaffected party members (led by N. Magnat and O. Barash) managed to preserve NCPSU from complete breakdown through increased secrecy. Connection with regional groups was lost temporarily. During 1977-1980 NCPSU restored its activity.

In April 1977, NCPSU members once again became objects of KGB investigation, this time the one related to 1977 Moscow bombings – bomb explosions in Moscow Metro and on 25 October Street (now: Nikolskaya Street). These terrorist attacks claimed seven lives, while thirty-seven people were injured. The official version of events, made public in January 1979, claimed that the explosions were organized by an underground Armenian nationalist organization led by Stepan Zatikyan. But for NCPSU members this investigation resulted in detentions, interrogations and establishing a demonstrative surveillance. "Incriminated" NCPSU members were aware of undisguised monitoring by KGB up until 1982.

In all, there were 32 members in NCPSU, mainly in Moscow and Moscow Oblast, but there were also groups in Kirov (2 members), Leningrad (2 members), in Ukraine (Dnepropetrovsk, 2 members), in Georgia (Tbilisi and Rustavi, 2 members), in Latvia (Riga, 1 member). Of these, 10 members failed in Moscow in 1975 and 2 more in Kirov in 1980. There is also evidence of an attempt to establish an affiliated group in Kineshma (Ivanovo Oblast), but this attempt was not successful.

In 1984, analyzing the processes taking place in the USSR (following the deaths of Mikhail Suslov, Leonid Brezhnev and Yuri Andropov, the party leaders have concluded that the Communist Party of the Soviet Union regime was on the brink of collapse and that the country will soon enter a period of radical transformation. In the new circumstances a small clandestine organization would not be able to play any significant social role or affect political processes in the country. This had become a topic of NCPSU discussion in the second half of 1984 leading to the party's self-dissolution in January 1985).

== Ideology ==
=== Early period ===
Party's early ideological principles were outlined by Alexander Tarasov in "The Principles of Neo-communism" (Russian: Принципы неокоммунизма) and some other works ("Every Man is a King", "Chile, Cyprus crisis and Eurocommunism", "Revolutionary Dictature, NEP and Stalinism", "Swamp Rot. Black Hundreds as Revolutionary Counter-revolutionism of Petit bourgeoisie", etc.), which have been destroyed together with the party's archive in the village of Valentinovka in 1975.

In accordance with those early principles the USSR economy was viewed as socialist from the late 1930s (which corresponded to the official Stalinism guideline), but at the same time the political system was seen as non-socialist: with socialism the power should belong to the society, to the people, but in the USSR it belonged to the ruling bureaucracy. In reality the society was removed from power. To explain this phenomenon A. Tarasov used Vladimir Lenin's idea of the possibility of the "power takeover". In Tarasov's interpretation, in the late 1920s – early 1930s a group of Joseph Stalin's supporters, representing the interests of petit bourgeoisie – first and foremost, of the bureaucratic officials, - has defeated the groups representing the interests of the working class and revolutionary intelligentsia in the inner-party struggle, and overtook the power. This became possible because the economy was not socialist yet, while in the multi-structural soviet national economy state capitalism was the most progressive form of economic organization. Through large-scale repressions and eradication of potential political opposition Stalin and his accomplices secured their own political immunity. In the late 1930s, when soviet economy has become socialist "in the main", and, consequently, the society could take the power over, no one who would be capable of doing so was left: politically active part of society was wiped out, the rest were frightened. The bureaucratic rule was established.

This theory implied that suchlike socio-economic system was unnatural and therefore would eventually lead to inevitable political revolution, when political superstructure would be aligned with the economic base. According to A. Tarasov, the bureaucratic rule is holding back the development of productive forces and thus brings to life the classic conflict of Marxism: the conflict between productive forces and the relations of production.

Tarasov also advocated the idea that the dictatorship of Soviet bureaucracy, counter-revolutionary by nature, is doomed to failure due to its foreign policy – the policy of rejection of the world revolution, the policy of "peaceful competition with capitalism" (which manifested itself in the dissolution of Comintern by Stalin). This policy was defensive - not offensive. USSR was losing its allies both on the state level (The People's Republic of China, Albania, Yugoslavia, Egypt, etc.), and within the communist movement (the breakaway of Maoists, Eurocommunists, Dominican Communist Party, Communist Party of the Netherlands, etc.) Therefore, Tarasov concluded, Soviet government would inevitably lose in the "peaceful competition", suffer economic breakdown and push the peoples of the Soviet Union to revolution.

According to this theory, the rule of bureaucracy was leading to the alienation of the people from the power, a phenomenon that would continue even after the complete abolishment of capitalism. In the presence of the bureaucratic domination, such alienation was causing cultural degradation and limiting public life to rituals, borrowed from the arsenals of the bourgeois representative democracy (parliament, elections, the presence of one or more political parties (in the satellite countries of the Soviet Union: East Germany, Poland, Czechoslovakia, Bulgaria, China, North Korea, Vietnam), etc.). Imminent social tension created by the continuing alienation was acting as a psychological catalyst for the future revolution.

The rule of bureaucracy, which represented the views of petit bourgeoisie, had led to the dominance of philistinism in all spheres of social life (everyday living, culture, professional activity, relations of production, formal politics) and to the annihilation of anti-bourgeois ideology and psychology. On the one hand, this was condemning the cultural and social life to stagnation and degradation; on the other – was leading to the crisis of social relations – the crisis, that the ruling regime could not resolve. Objectively, this was forcing the bureaucrats to "tighten the screws," promote neo-Stalinism or, most likely, reestablish downright bourgeois relations, restore capitalism. Consequently, any legal revolutionary activity had become impossible, creating the necessary for an underground organization and underground struggle.

The ruling soviet bureaucracy learnt from the events of the October Revolution of 1917. This is precisely why the representatives of the working class in the USSR (specifically those concentrated on large industrial enterprises) firstly, were a subject of particularly strong ideological control; secondly, the regime was constantly "flirting" with the workers, praising them and simultaneously imposing on them the ideology of ruling bureaucracy, corrupting them by mass culture; and thirdly, any attempts to create independent trade unions or other working class organizations were nipped in the bud. The information blockade was making it impossible for the workers to draw objective and outright conclusions about the real situation on the country; "brainwashing" (through propaganda and "political learning") did not allow them to develop their own ideology; the "canal system" of the social vertical mobility in the Soviet Union was enabling the most advanced and driven workers to obtain higher education and move to a different social category. Those were the main factors holding the working class from becoming the vanguard of the new revolution. Students, on the other hand, could become such vanguard, on account of being a social group whose position in the social structure of the soviet society was not yet secured; as a mobile group with wider access to information; finally, a group designated to intellectual activity. Besides, students could not be comfortable with the idea that after graduating from colleges and universities they were doomed to become ordinary, low paid employees, dependent on bureaucrats and, in the majority, with little prospect for growth. Control mechanisms among the young people were impaired by degeneration of the Komsomol (Russian: ВЛКСМ) which could no longer play the role of the youth's leader.

The above explains NCPSU strategy, based on propaganda specifically among students, as well as its particular interest in the "youth revolution" of the 1960s in the West, with an emphasis on studying the experience of student movement in the United States, France, Italy, South Korea).

Thus, in early stages NCPSU acted on the premise that the USSR was in need of a political revolution, not the social one.

By 1978 these ideological postulates no longer satisfied Tarasov's fellow party members, as well as himself. They were seriously criticized by N. Magnat, V. Minorsky, S. Trubkin, V. Makartsov. During 1978-1979 Tarasov developed for NCPSU a new, much more serious and original ideology.

== See also ==
- Post-Marxism
- Samizdat
- New Communist movement

== Literature ==
- Тарасов А. Н., Черкасов Г. Ю., Шавшукова Т. В. "Левые в России: от умеренных до экстремистов". — М.: Институт экспериментальной социологии, 1997. (Tarasov, A., Cherkasov, G., Shavshukova, T. "The Left Wing in Russia: From Moderate to Extremists". — Moscow: Institute of Experimental Sociology, 1997). ISBN 5-87637-006-1
- Тарасов А. Н. "Революция не всерьёз. Штудии по теории и истории квазиреволюционных движений". — Екатеринбург: "Ультра.Культура", 2005. (Tarasov, A. "Not A Serious Revolution. Study of the Theory and History of Quasi-Revolutionary Movements". — Yekaterinburg: "Ultra.Culture" Publishing House, 2005). ISBN 5-9681-0067-2
- "Красные диссиденты" // Газета "Левый поворот" (Краснодар), N 5. ("Red Dissidents" // "Left Turn" (Krasnodar), N 5.)
- "Лубянка, 2. Из истории отечественной контрразведки". — М.: Издательство объединения «Мосгорархив»; АО «Московские учебники и Картолитография», 1999. ("Lubyanka, 2. Extracts from the History of Homeland Counterintelligence". — Moscow: Publishing House of "Mosgorarkhiv" Association; JSC "Moscow Textbooks and Maplithography", 1999). ISBN 5-7228-0066-X
- Fäldin H. Neokommunistiska partiet. Okänd sida av Sovjetunionens vänster oppositions historiens. // Medborgaren, 1994, N 12.
- Roßbach K. Kontrkulttuuri Neuvostoliittossa: hippien ja neokommunistien välillä. // Sosiaalinen arkkisto, 1995, N 1.
