= Camarades =

French autonomist magazine

- Final issue Number: nouvelle série, N° 7-8
- Country: France
- Based in: Paris
- Language: French

Camarades was French autonomist magazine published in Paris in the 1970s. It was published by a group of the same name which played a major role in the development of the autonomist movement in France. Their politics were often characterised as that of "organised autonomy".

== First series ==
There were four issues of the first series:

- N° 1 (April-May 1974)
- N° 2-3 (April-May 1975, )
- N° 4 (December 1975)

== New series ==
A second series, called "nouvelle série" then appeared:

- N° 1 (April-May 1976)
- N° 2 (Summer 1976): Issue includes Chomage made in the USA by Paolo Carpignano.
- N° 3 (December 1976)
- N° 4-5 (June 1977)

supplement to N° 4 : Autonomie et autodéfense (May 1977) 4 pp.

- N° 6 (November 1977)
- N° 7-8 (Spring-Summer 1978)

supplement to N° 7-8 : Dossier travail précaire 14pp.
