= Moscow Hermitage Garden =

Park in Moscow, Russia

Coordinates: 55°46′16″N 37°36′27″E

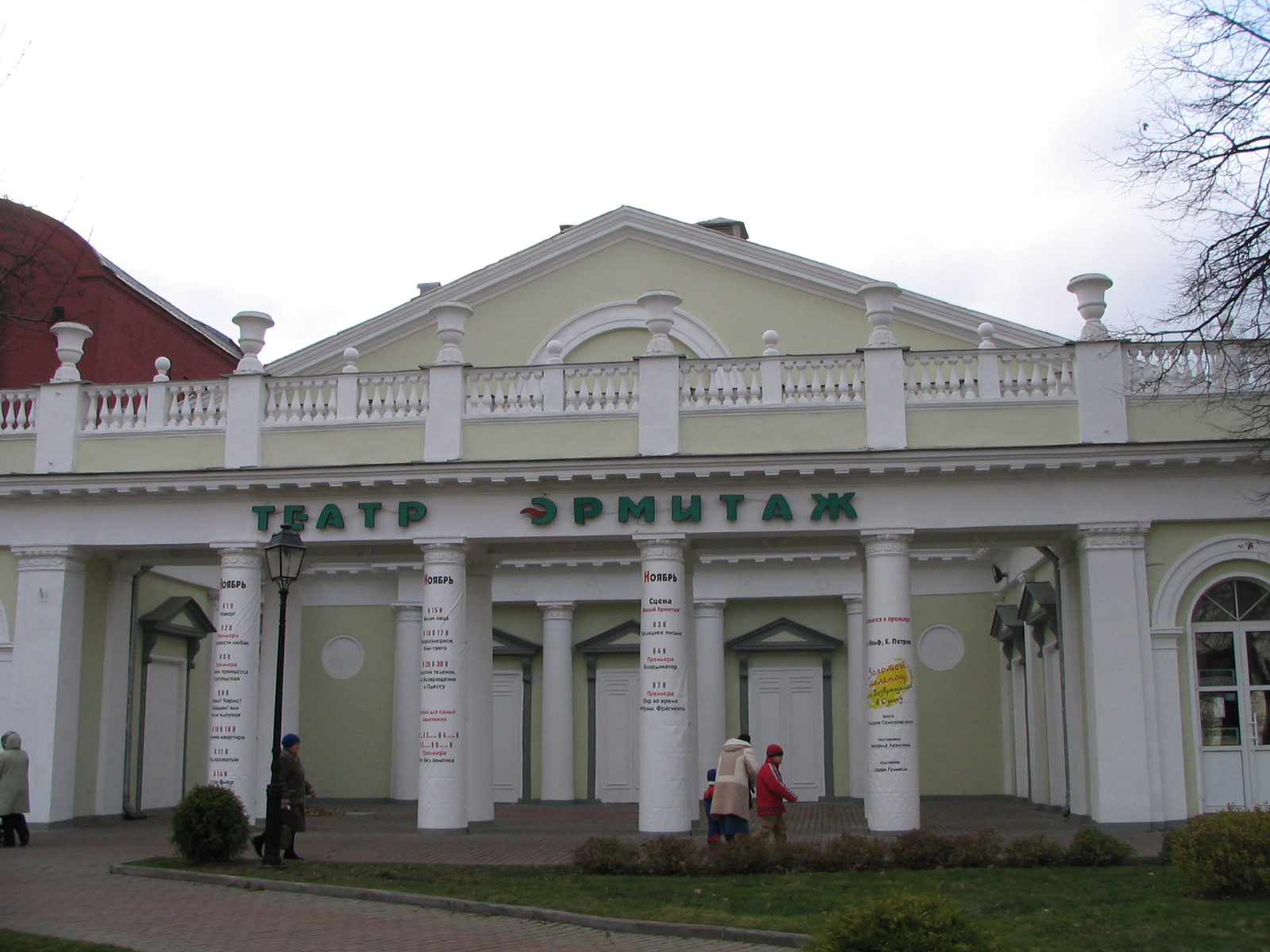
Hermitage Theater

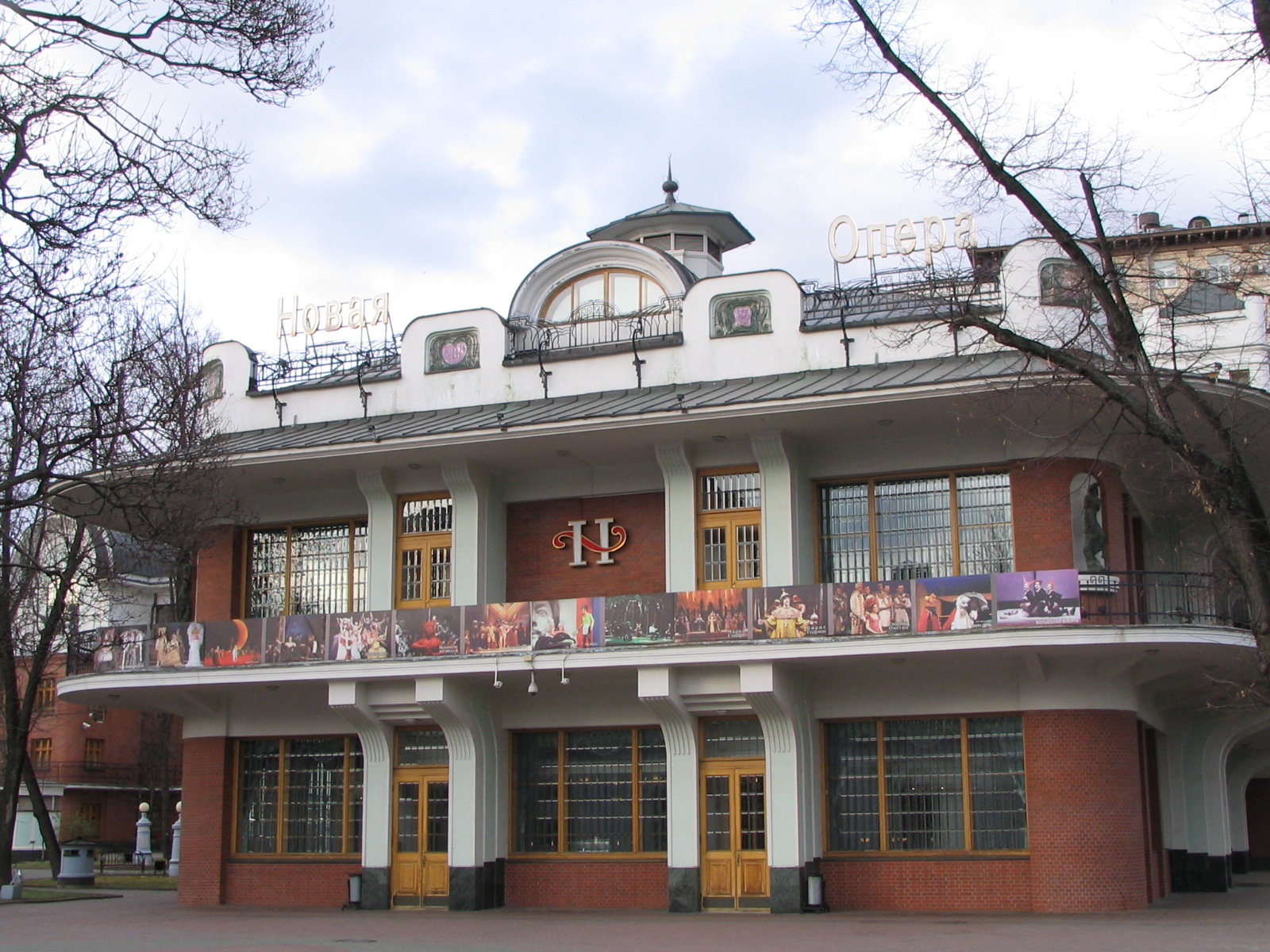
Novaya Opera Theater

Moscow Hermitage Garden (Russian: Сад Эрмитаж), a popular recreation spot, is a park in the central part of Moscow, Russia on Karetny Ryad Street. It is known for its cultural attractions and adjacent theaters. Regular events include opera, ballet and concerts.

== History ==
The Garden was developed by Yakov Schukin, a Russian theater entrepreneur and mecenate, and opened to the general public in 1894. Cosy summer garden for open-air concerts with open stage was formed by Y. Schukin around his theater. The official dedication was held on June 18, 1895. On first time the Garden was named "New Hermitage".

26 May 1896 it hosted the Lumière's Cinématographe premiere in Moscow. In 1898 here on the stage of Hermitage Theatre on Karetnyi Ryad was opened Moscow Art Theatre. Also the premieres of famous works of Chekhov The Seagull 1898, Uncle Vanya 1899, Three Sisters 1901, have been performed here.

Performances here have included such prominent actors as Sarah Bernhardt, Ernesto Rossi, Gustavo Salvini and many others. The Garden has been the site of operas by the Savva Mamontov company and seen benefices for Fyodor Shalyapin.

== At present time ==
The Novaya Opera, Hermitage and Sphera theaters are located in the Hermitage Garden.

Since 1998 at summertime the Garden is a traditional venue for Moscow International Outdoor Jazz Festival – “Jazz at the Hermitage Garden”.

In 2000, two busts were erected in the Hermitage Garden: the first is French writer and poet Victor Hugo, offered by the mayor of Paris, and the second is Italian writer Dante Alighieri, gift of the Italian government.

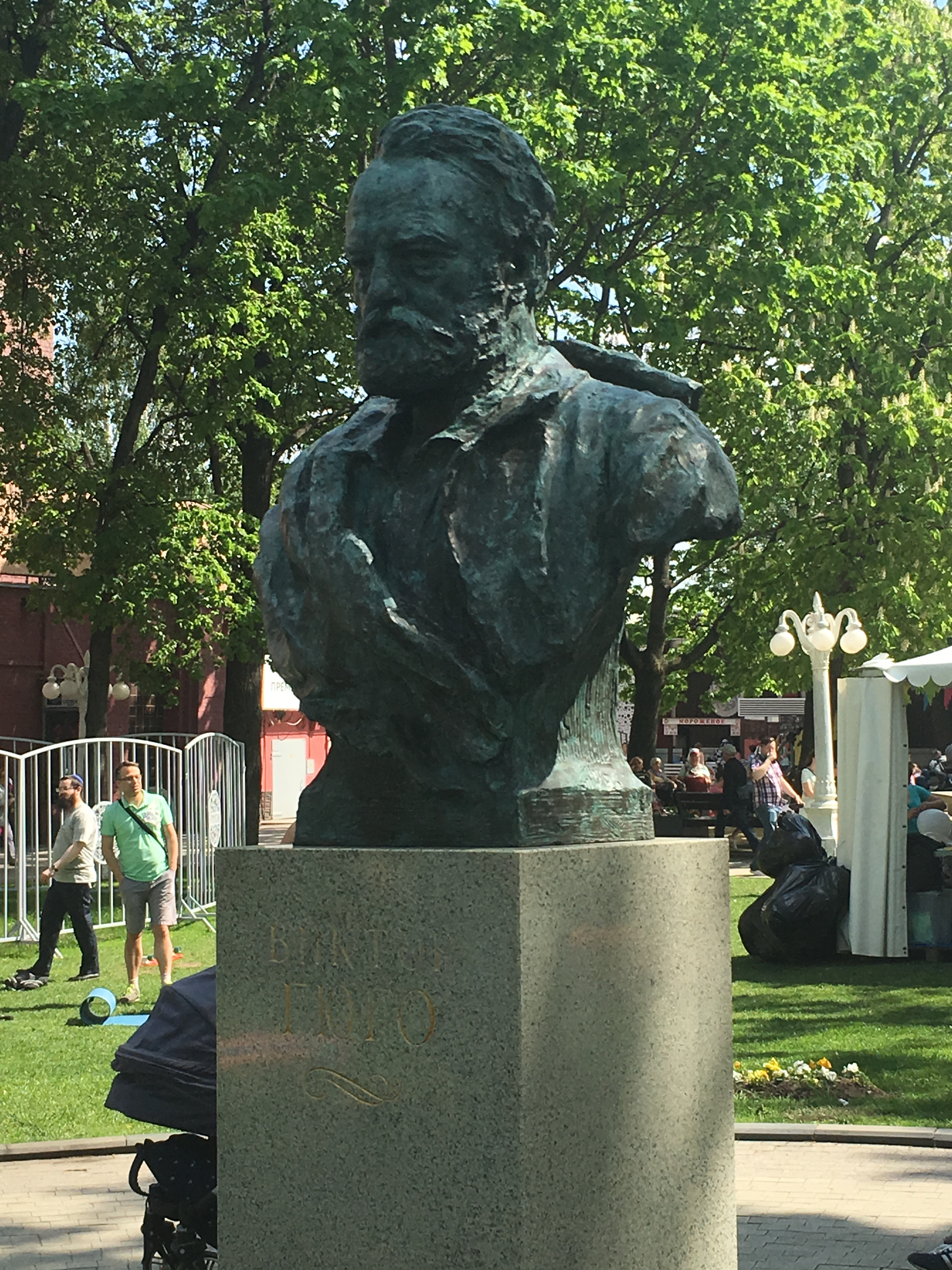
Bust of Victor Hugo

=== 2008 fire ===
On February 7, 2008 the historic Schukin Stage building (Russian: Щукинская сцена) was damaged by a fire that broke out in the upscale nightclub Dyagilev Project. The nightclub, which had opened in March 2006, was burnt to the ground. Emergency services tried to extinguish the fire using a specially equipped helicopter. The roof and wooden beams of the Schukin building collapsed, leaving only a solid brick wall. The administrative offices part of the building was not damaged. The official investigation concluded that the fire was caused by a short circuit. Officials announced that the historic building would be restored.
