= Yuri Semenov =

Russian sociologist (1929–2023)

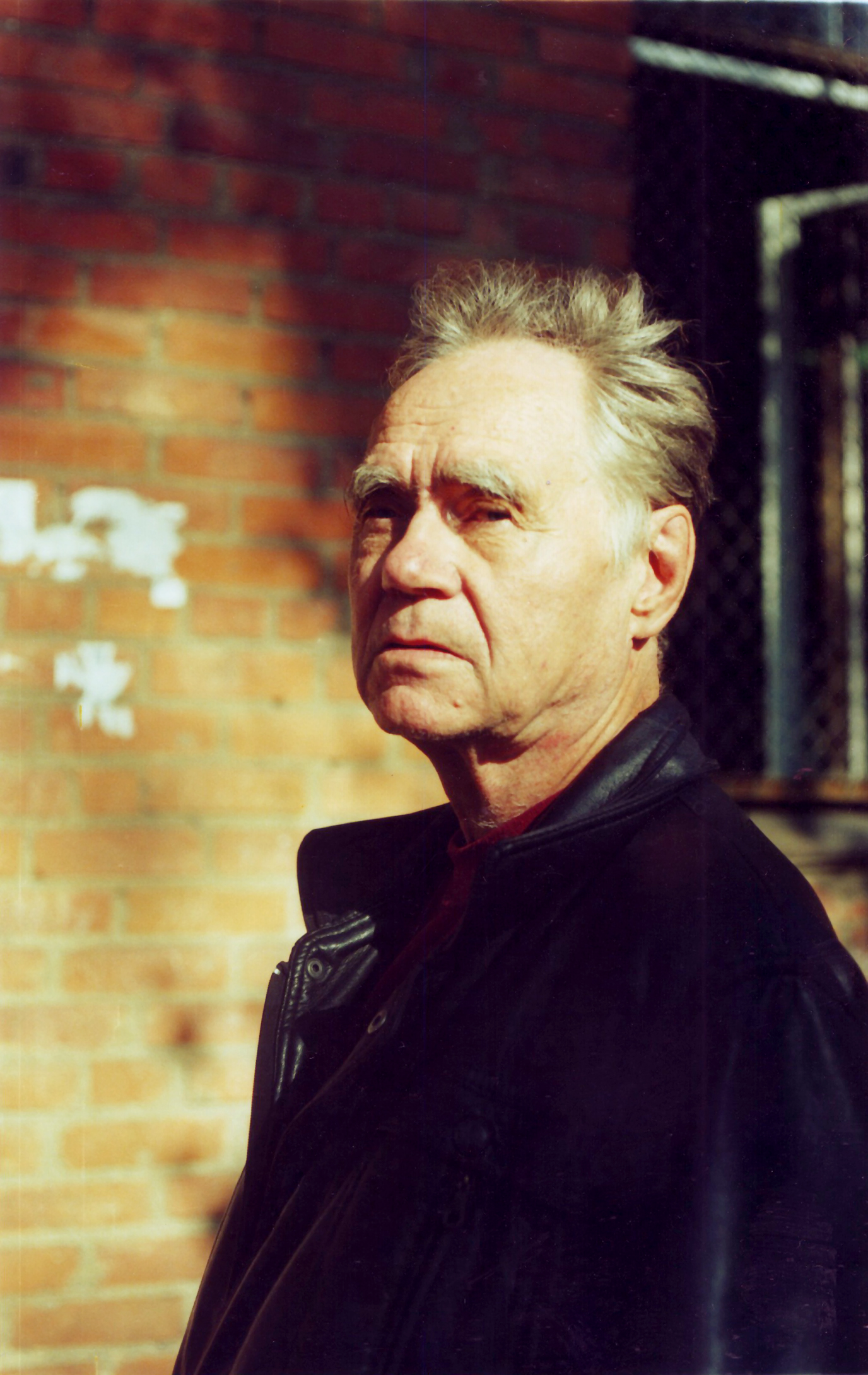
- Born: September 5, 1929; Sverdlovsk, USSR
- Died: April 26, 2023 (aged 93); Moscow, Russia
- Education: Krasnoyarsk State Pedagogical Institute
- Scientific career
- Fields: History of primitive society Theory of knowledge Philology
- Workplaces: Moscow Institute of Physics and Technology

Yuriy Ivanovich Semenov (September 5, 1929 – April 26, 2023) was a Soviet and Russian historian, philosopher, ethnologist, anthropologist, expert on the history of philosophy, history of primitive society, and the theory of knowledge. He was also the original creator of the globally-formation (relay-stadial) concept of world history and is a Doctor of Philosophy, Doctor of Historical Sciences (1963), and Professor. He was Distinguished Professor at the Moscow Institute of Physics and Technology.

== Life and career ==
Yuriy Ivanovich Semenov was born on September 5, 1929. He graduated from the history department of the Krasnoyarsk State Pedagogical Institute (1951). For a while he taught history in the provincial universities. After his work in the field of anthroposotsiogenesis attracted the attention of prominent scientists of Moscow, he defended his doctoral thesis at the Institute of Ethnography (1963). In 1967, Semenov became a professor of the Department of Philosophy of the Moscow Physical-Technical Institute (Dolgoprudny), where he worked for half a century. Semenov also worked at the Institute of World History, USSR Academy of Sciences and the Institute of Ethnology and Anthropology.

Having begun a scientific career by studying the primitive society, Semenov simultaneously developed the problem of political society - first class societies that preceded feudalism. Research in this area led him to create the original globally stadial concept of world history. Throughout his academic career sharing the basic principles of Marxism, Semenov developed these ideas according to the new factual material, thus becoming one of the prominent members of the Soviet (and later - Russian) "creative Marxism".

Semenov died on April 26, 2023, at the age of 93.

== Selected publications ==
- Semyonov, Yuri I. “O moem ‘puti v pervobytnost’.” Akademik Yu. V. Bromley i otechestvennaya etnologiya, 1960–1990. Moscow: Nauka, 2003, pp. 164–211.
- Semyonov, Yuri. I. “Antroposotsiogenez.” Sotsial’naya filosofiya: Uchebnyi slovar'. Moscow: Akademicheskii proekt, 2008, pp. 12–17.
- Semyonov, Yuri. I. “ ‘Proiskhozhdenie sem’i, chastnoi sobstvennosti i gosudarstva’ F. Engelsa i sovremennye dannye etnografii.” Voprosy filosofii 7, 1959, pp.137–147.
- Semyonov, Yuri. I. “O teorii pervobytnosti i o mnogom drugom. Chast’ 2.” Lichnost’. Kul’tura. Obshchestvo 8, no. 2, pp. 77–94.
- Semyonov, Yuri. I. “Po povodu retsenzii Bakhty.” Narody Azii i Afriki 3, 1971, pp. 245–247.
- Semyonov, Yuri. I. “Problema perekhoda ot materinskogo roda k ottsovskomu (Opyt teoreticheskogo analiza).” Sovetskaya etnografiya (now Etnograficheskoe Obozrenie) 5, 1970, pp. 57–71.
- Semyonov, Yuri. I. “Problema istoricheskogo sootnosheniya materinskoi i ottsovskoi filiacii u avstraliitsev.” Sovetskaya etnografiya 6, 1971, pp.101–111.
- Semyonov, Yuri. I. “O materinskom rode i osedlosti v pozdnem paleolite.” Sovetskaya etnografiya 4, 1973.
- Semyonov, Yuri. I. “O spetsifike proizvodstvennykh (sotsial’no-ekonomicheskikh) otnoshenii pervobytnogo obshchestva.” Sovetskaya etnografiya 4, 1976, pp. 93–113.
- Semyonov, Yuri. I. “Ob iznachal’noi forme pervobytnykh sotsial’no-ekonomicheskikh otnoshenii.” Sovetskaya etnografiya 2, 1977, pp.15–20.
- Semyonov, Yuri. I. “O razlichii mezhdu dokazatel’stvami ad veritatem i ad hominem, o nekotorykh momentakh moei nauchnoi biografii i epizodakh iz istorii sovetskoi etnografii i eshche raz o knige N. M. Girenko ‘Sotsiologiya plemeni’.” Etnograficheskoe obozrenie 6, 1994, pp. 3–19.
- Semyonov, Yuri. I. “Po povodu stat’i O. Yu. Artyomovoi ‘Otechestvennaya teoriya “pervobytnosti” i sotsial’naya organizatsiya aborigenov Avstralii’.” Lichnost’. Kul’tura. Obshchestvo 7, no. 4, 2005, pp. 384–389.
- Semyonov, Yuri. I. “Razrabotka problem istorii pervobytnogo obshchestva v Institute etnografii AN SSSR v ‘epokhu’ Bromleya (vospominaniya i razmyshleniya).” Etnograficheskoe obozrenie 6, 2001, pp. 3–20.
- Semyonov, Yuri. I. “O teorii pervobytnosti i o mnogom drugom. Ch. 1.” Lichnost’. Kul’tura. Obshchestvo 8, no. 1, 2006, pp. 80–98.
- Semyonov, Yuri. I. “O teorii pervobytnosti i o mnogom drugom. Ch. 2.” Lichnost’. Kul’tura. Obshchestvo 8, no. 2, 2006, pp. 77–94.
- Semyonov, Yuri. I. “Perekhod ot pervobytnogo obshchestva k klassovomu: puti i varianty razvitiya.” Etnograficheskoe obozrenie 1, 1993, pp. 52–70.
- Semyonov, Yuri. I. “Perekhod ot pervobytnogo obshchestva k klassovomu: puti i varianty razvitiya.” Etnograficheskoe obozrenie 2, 1993, pp. 57–74.
- Semyonov, Yuri. I. “Diletantizm protiv nauki (razmyshleniya ob odnoi retsenzii).” Skepsis.
- Semyonov, Yuri. I. Vvedenie vo vsemirnuyu istoriyu. Vypusk I: Problema i ponyatiinyi apparat. Vozniknovenie chelovecheskogo obshchestva.
- Semyonov, Yuri. I. “Teoriya obshchestvenno-ekonomicheskikh formatsii i vsemirnyi istoricheskii protsess.” Narody Azii i Afriki 5, 1970, pp. 82–95.

English version: “The Theory of Socioeconomic Formations and the Historical Process.” Soviet Anthropology and Archaeology 4, no. 2 (1965).

- Semyonov, Yuri. I. “Marksistsko-leninskaya teoriya obshchestvenno-ekonomicheskikh formatsii i istoricheskii protsess.” Filosofskie nauki 5, 1973, pp. 3–13.

German version: Sowjetwissenschaft. Gesellschaftwissenschaftliche Beiträge 2 (1974). Spanish version: Habana, 1987.

- Semenov, Yuri. I. “The Theory of Socioeconomic Formations and World History.” Soviet and Western Anthropology, 1980, pp. 29–58.
- Semenov, Yuri. I. “Socioeconomic Formations in Historical Process.” Philosophy in the USSR: Problems of Historical Materialism. Moscow: Progress Publishers, 1981, pp. 33–51.
- Semyonov, Yuri. I. “Iz istorii teoreticheskoi razrabotki V. I. Leninym natsional’nogo voprosa.” Narody Azii i Afriki 4, 1966, pp. 106–129.
- Semyonov, Yuri. I. “K opredeleniyu ponyatiya ‘natsiya’.” Narody Azii i Afriki 4, 1967, pp. 86–102.
- Semyonov, Yuri. I. “Natsiya.” Slovar’ filosofskikh terminov. Moscow: INFRA-M, 2004, pp. 350–352.
