= Party of New Communists =

Party of New Communists Партия новых коммунистов
- Abbreviation: PNC (English); ПНК (Russian)
- Leader: Alexander Tarasov; Vasily Minorsky
- Founded: Winter 1972-1973
- Dissolved: January 1977
- Succeeded by: Neo-Communist Party of the Soviet Union
- Headquarters: Moscow or Kaliningrad, Russian SFSR, USSR
- Ideology: Neocommunism; Orthodox Marxism; Marxism-Leninism; Revolutionary socialism Direct democracy Trotskyism; Neo-anarchism; Anti-Stalinism
- Political position: Far-left
- National affiliation: Neo-Communist Party of the Soviet Union (1974-1977)
- Slogan: «Revolution — now and here!» (Russian: «Революция — сейчас и здесь!»)

The Party of New Communists (PNC; Russian: Партия новых коммунистов; ПНК; Partiya novykh kommunistov, PNK) was a clandestine radical left organization, founded by Alexander Tarasov and Vasily Minorsky in Moscow at the end of 1972 and the beginning of 1973.

In terms of its theoretical foundations, PNC combined elements or orthodox Marxism, Leninism, Trotskyism and Neo-anarchism (as inspired by Daniel Cohn-Bendit of May 1968). The economic system that existed in the USSR was viewed by PNC members as socialist, but at the same time the political system was seen as non-socialist (neo-Stalinist, bureaucratic), which, in their opinion, represented the classic conflict of Marxism: the conflict between productive forces and the relations of production, and would inevitably lead to a political revolution. PNC members believed that the victory of a group of Joseph Stalin's supporters over their political opponents in the inner-party struggle within VKP (b) in the late 1920s and early 1930s was the reason of the fundamental differences between political and economic systems.

PNC set it as their objective to perform a political revolution and return the country back to pre-Stalinist ideological and political foundations. Students were thought to be the vanguard of the new revolution.

PNC had neither a developed structure, nor official theoretical documents (it was expected that such documents would be adopted by the future party conference). The organisation consisted of just two groups in Moscow and one in the city of Kaliningrad (presently known as Korolyov, a city in Moscow Region). "The Principles of Neo-communism" (Russian: Принципы неокоммунизма) written by A. Tarasov in the form of a catechism in November 1973, served as a temporary theoretical and programme document of the party. In some theoretical issues, important from the point of view of PNC members, they were guided by Tarasov's works, written in 1973-1974 and revised after they had been discussed within PNC. Such theoretical issues included: preference of revolutionary approach to the reformist one (based on the work "Chile, Cyprus crisis and Eurocommunism"); identification of the new Soviet philistines as representatives of petite bourgeoisie and a major reactionary force in the Soviet society (based on the work "Swamp Rot. Black Hundreds as Revolutionary Counter-revolutionism of Petit Bourgeoisie"); incompatibility of representative democracy and communism, the need for direct democracy (based on the work "Every Man is a King"). None of these works have survived; they were burnt in January 1975.

PNC members were engaged in sourcing, selecting and distributing illegal literature ("samizdat" and literature of the pre-Stalinist period), established contacts among students and young people, promoted their ideas through verbal propaganda (in the 1970s, such propaganda was prosecuted as felony, which carried a penalty of up to seven years in prison under Art. 70 of the Criminal Code of the RSFSR).

In the summer of 1974, PNC members ran a trial graffiti propaganda campaign, when they inscribed in chalk on buildings and fences about fifteen messages that read "Revolution – here and now!", "Remove the seniles from power!", "Ten years is enough!" (referring to long years of Brezhnev's term in office). The campaign proved to be a failure: the inscriptions were fairly dull in colour and were easily washed away by rain. It was decided to abandon the use of graffiti and start printing and distributing flyers.

In September 1973, PNC established contacts with another underground leftist group, called the Left School, having first concurred with them in their views on the reasons for the defeat of the Chilean revolution of 1970–1973 years, and then on the nature of the political regime in the USSR. In May 1974 PNC and Left School agreed to unite their forces, and in September 1974 they merged into one organization under the name of the Neo-Communist Party of the Soviet Union (NCPSU).

Despite the agreement to merge, de facto PNC and the Left School were operating separately for some time; therefore, when part of the Moscow group of PNC (including its leaders) was arrested by the KGB in January 1975, the unaffected leaders of the Left School took on the task of saving the organisation through increased secrecy. They successfully kept the organization alive deep underground up until 1977, when arrested NCPSU leaders (from among former PNC members) were released to freedom and began to revive the party. Thus, until January 1977, PNC existed as a separate clandestine group effectively controlled by the Left School.

== Literature ==
- Тарасов А. Н., Черкасов Г. Ю., Шавшукова Т. В. "Левые в России: от умеренных до экстремистов". — М.: Институт экспериментальной социологии, 1997. (Tarasov, A., Cherkasov, G., Shavshukova, T. "The Left Wing in Russia: From Moderate to Extremists". — Moscow: Institute of Experimental Sociology, 1997). ISBN 5-87637-006-1
- Тарасов А. Н. "Революция не всерьёз. Штудии по теории и истории квазиреволюционных движений". — Екатеринбург: "Ультра.Культура", 2005. (Tarasov, A. "Not A Serious Revolution. Study of the Theory and History of Quasi-Revolutionary Movements". — Yekaterinburg: "Ultra.Culture" Publishing House, 2005). ISBN 5-9681-0067-2
- "Красные диссиденты" // Газета "Левый поворот" (Краснодар), N 5. ("Red Dissidents" // "Left Turn" (Krasnodar), N 5.
- Fäldin H. Neokommunistiska partiet. Okänd sida av Sovjetunionens vänster oppositions historiens. // Medborgaren, 1994, N 12.
- Roßbach K. Kontrkulttuuri Neuvostoliittossa: hippien ja neokommunistien välillä. // Sosiaalinen arkkisto, 1995, N 1.
