= Serve the People (Norway) =

Communist organization in Norway

Serve the People – Communist League Tjen Folket – Kommunistisk Forbund
- Founded: 1998
- Split from: Workers' Communist Party
- Youth wing: Revolutionary Communist Youth
- Ideology: Communism; Marxism–Leninism–Maoism; Anti-revisionism; Revolutionary socialism
- Political position: Far-left
- International affiliation: ICOR (until 2013); International Communist League (since 2022)

Party flag

Website
- tjen-folket.no

Serve the People – Communist League (Norwegian: Tjen Folket – Kommunistisk Forbund) is a Norwegian communist organization formed in 1998 by expelled members of the Workers' Communist Party. It aims to establish a new communist party in Norway based on and guided by Marxism-Leninism-Maoism. Its youth wing is the Revolutionary Communist Youth, which was created after a split from Red Youth, the youth wing of the Red Party, who it deems as revisionist.

The organization supports people's war and claims that this is the only means by which socialism and communism can be established. It is open to the use of violence as a means to protect the proletariat against reprisals from the bourgeoisie. It regards Karl Marx, Friedrich Engels, Vladimir Lenin, Joseph Stalin, Mao Zedong and Abimael Guzmán as the six leading communists who developed Marxism–Leninism–Maoism.

== History ==
Serve the People – A Marxist–Leninist Group was established in 1998 as a splinter group from AKP. Serve the People claim that the cause of the split was rightism within AKP's leadership.

Several members of AKP and its youth organization, Rød Ungdom (Red Youth) were consequentially expelled from AKP, Red Electoral Alliance (RV), Red Party, and/or Red Youth.

Henrik Ormåsen, the spokesperson for Serve the People, was expelled from the AKP and Red Youth in 1997 and from the Red Party in 2008 when he said that Joseph Stalin was a great theoretician. According to the Red Party leader Torstein Dahle, Ormåsen has "harmed the party and brought into question what the party stood for."

Serve the People launched an ideological campaign with the task of starting a new communist party after the collapse of AKP and changed its subtitle from "A Marxist-Leninist Group" to "Communist League" in 2009.

== Political theory ==
Serve the People bases its political theory on Marxism-Leninism-Maoism and states that contemporary Marxism has been developed through three stages. The original stage of Marxism was developed by Marx and Engels in the 19th century. The second stage is Leninism as developed by Lenin and Stalin. The third stage is Maoism, "the most advanced form of revolutionary theory today", according to the organization's program.

According to Serve the People, Marxism distinguishes itself from other forms of socialism (e.g. utopian socialism) by building on scientific theories regarding the development of human society, and the idea that through praxis, humans can influence this societal development:

Marxism is our science to make the world a better place. We need Marxism to understand how capitalism works and how to abolish it.

On its website, Tjen Folket summarizes its "Marxism-Leninism" with three fundamental principles governing the communist party:

- Well-organized and disciplined.
- Open only for people who are willing to study communism, remain active in the party, and develop themselves to become good leaders for the struggles they must lead.
- Based on democratic centralism, such that all members participate in developing the party's politics, but that the minority accepts the decisions made by the majority and work for them.

The organization sees Maoism as not only "Marxism for China", but offers "many teachings for international communists."

Other central sources of inspiration that the league refers to in its theoretical and political foundation besides AKP and the "five classics" are the Revolutionary Internationalist Movement (France), the Communist Party of Peru – Shining Path, the Communist Party of India (Maoist), the Communist Party of the Philippines, and the Communist Party of Turkey/Marxist–Leninist, among others.

== Campaigns ==
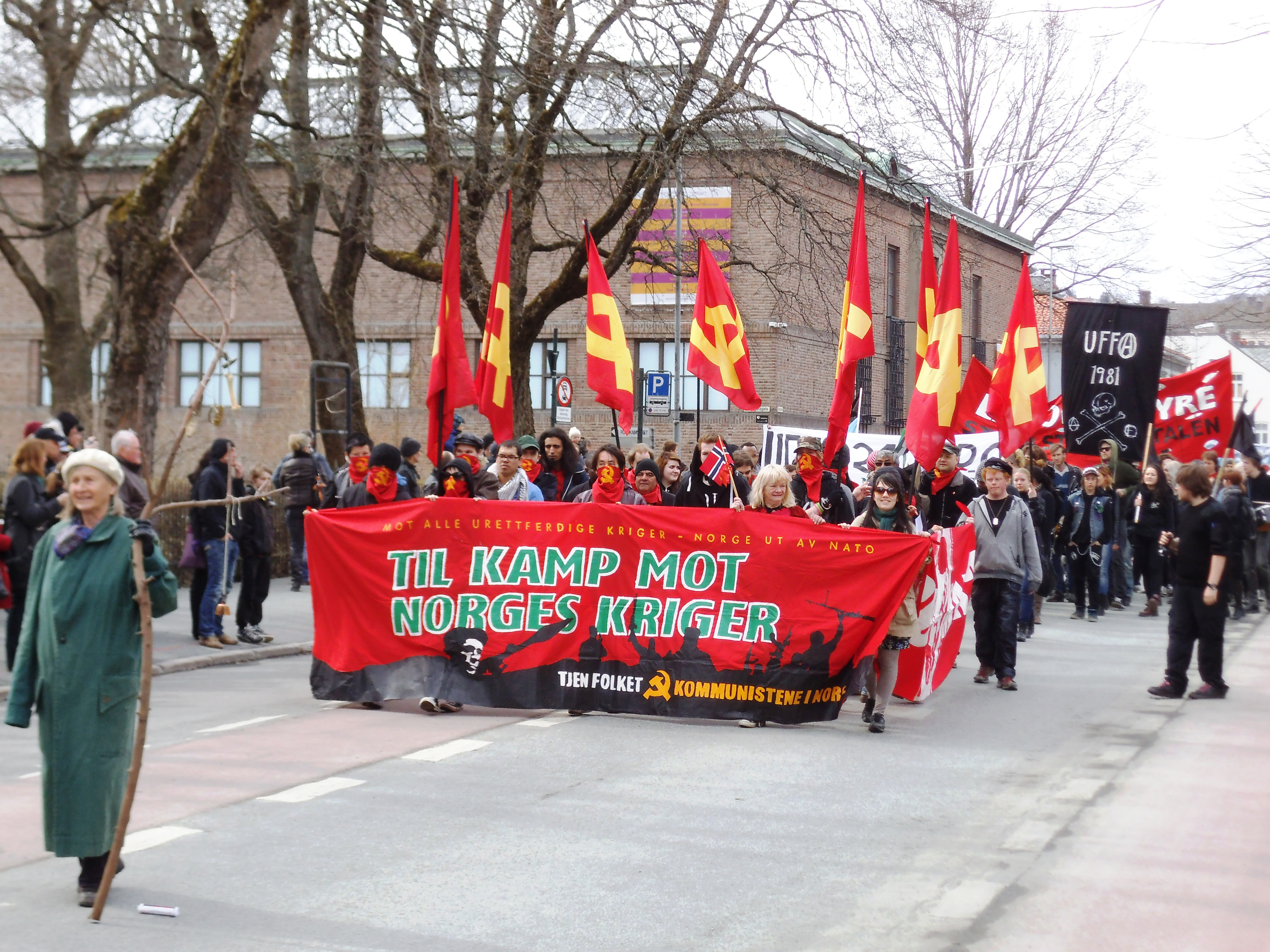
Members at the 2013 May Day parade in Trondheim, Norway

=== Election boycott ===
Serve the People has called for a boycott of each local and parliamentary election held in Norway since 2009, including the parliamentary elections in 2009, 2013, and 2017, as well as local elections in 2011 and 2015.

Serve the People offer three main reasons for boycotting the election:

- People should opt for rebellion and socialism, and that the road to socialism is revolution, not elections.
- The candidate parties are complicit in contemporary Norwegian imperialism and war-mongering.
- Regardless of the outcome of the election, the important questions will be decided according to the interests of the bourgeoisie.

=== Anti-revisionism ===
Serve the People has criticized several communist organizations in Norway, claiming that they are revisionists. The most notable example is its youth group's split from Red Youth. Serve the People have also criticized Hoxhaist tendencies within Marxist-Leninist Group Revolution (Norwegian: ML-Gruppa Revolusjon) and Communist Platform (Norwegian: Kommunistisk plattform, KP) for their reformist positions, and characterize those groups' reformism and revisionism as a logical consequence of their anti-Maoism.

=== Proletarian feminism ===
Serve the People has summarized its position on the women's liberation movement as follows:

As long as the class system has existed, women have been especially oppressed. We support women’s rights against discrimination, against low wages based on gender and against the sexualization of women through media. We can only be fully liberated when we create a communist society, however women’s liberation does not happen by itself. Women must organize together and fight for liberation both today under capitalism and under socialism. It is therefore that we want a society where the socio-economic differences between both genders are abolished.

The organization has participated in annual 8 March demonstrations, typically under the slogan of anti-imperialism and women's liberation through socialist revolution.

It has also published criticism of liberal feminism and radical feminism, saying that the former simply reinforces a class system that perpetuates the oppression of women and that the latter fails to recognize the primary contradiction in a class system and therefore does not address the core of the problem. In their stead, the organization offers proletarian feminism as a line for women's liberation. This divergence has manifested itself most prominently as a disagreement with other feminist movements on the question of prostitution, which Serve the People rejects as an oppressive practice.

== Controversy ==
The organization has been criticized on several occasions as being Stalinist and left-extremist, which the organization has denied. In response to allegations of extremism levied by then Prime Minister Erna Solberg, Tjen Folket wrote in an August 2017 editorial that "Violence can oppress, but it can also smash oppression and it can liberate", and that "If violence is extreme, then Valen and Solberg are the real extremists".

=== Relation to other groups on the left ===
Serve the People's former spokesperson Henrik Ormåsen was a member of the Red Electoral Alliance (later the Red Party) for several years. In 2008, he was expelled due to the Serve the People's criticisms of the Red Party. Ormåsen claims that the allegations were incorrect and that the decision to exclude him were wrong. In June 2008, 12 others were expelled from Red Youth, also on the basis of their alleged association with Serve the People. Later, other members of Serve the People would be excluded or freely withdraw from the Red Party.

After Communist Platform (KPml) was established in 2007, a polemic arose between the organizations. Serve the People claimed that KPml had never intended to work with Serve the People. The polemic ended shortly thereafter in what Serve the People described as a "public attack against Serve the People" by KPml. A cooperation between Serve the People and Communist Group in Bergen (Norwegian: Kommunistisk gruppe i Bergen, KGB) ended a year later as a result of a difference of opinion regarding political platforms, including their positions on Stalin as a leader.

=== Serve the People and SOS Racism ===
In 2010, several media outlets reported that many leaders and employees in the anti-racist organization SOS Racisme were associated with Serve the People. Some outlets alleged that public funding allocated to SOS was being used for Serve the People's activities. This has been denied by both Serve the People and SOS.

All three persons registered as leaders of Serve the People in the Entity Registry as per 2017 were in the central leadership of SOS Racism: Henrik Ormåsen as the working committee's deputy between 2008 and 2010, Kjell Gunnar Larsen as the chief treasurer, and Bjarne Stokke as a national leadership member.

=== Internal struggles ===
In 2011, former Serve the People member Nora Warholm claimed that Serve the People abused SOS Racism in order to advance its own interests. Another former central member in Serve the People, Bård Frantzen, harassed Warholm with sexist slurs and encouraged her to commit suicide. Serve the People has since publicly apologized for the incident and excluded Frantzen from the organization.

In 2012, a former spokesperson and member of Serve the People and RKU, Kim Kopperud published a harsh criticism of the organization with another former member. It outlined a lack of membership democracy, and Kopperud resigned from the organization in protest the same year.

In October 2012, four former members of Serve the People, SOS, and the associated organization Indiasolidaritet reportedly engaged in a fist fight with members of Serve the People in a meeting room in the Oslo Public Library. There are conflicting reports as to who started the fight.

In early 2018, Serve the People published an article where it apologized for having provided "a platform for dangerous persons". In August 2018, the organization published an article outlining a "pervasive and thorough" rectification campaign, partially regarding methods of leadership and partially regarding its ideological line.

== Youth wing ==
The Revolutionary Communist Youth (Norwegian: Revolusjonær Kommunistisk Ungdom, abbr. RKU) is the youth wing of the party. It was formed from a split within Red Youth, the youth affiliate of Red.
