= Youth Resistance =

Youth Resistance Jugendwiderstand
- Abbreviation: JW
- Founded: 1 May 2015
- Dissolved: 9 June 2019
- Headquarters: Berlin
- Ideology: Communism; Marxism–Leninism–Maoism
- Political position: Far-left
- Colours: Red; Yellow

Party flag
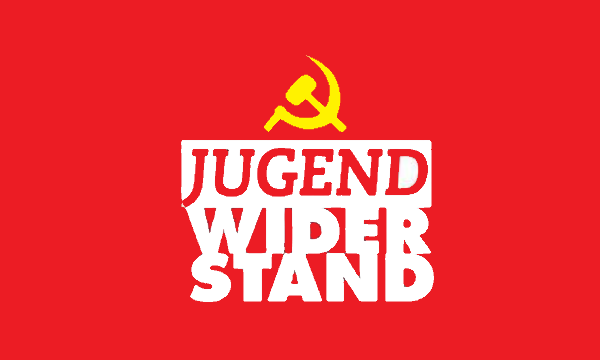

Website
- Youth Resistance

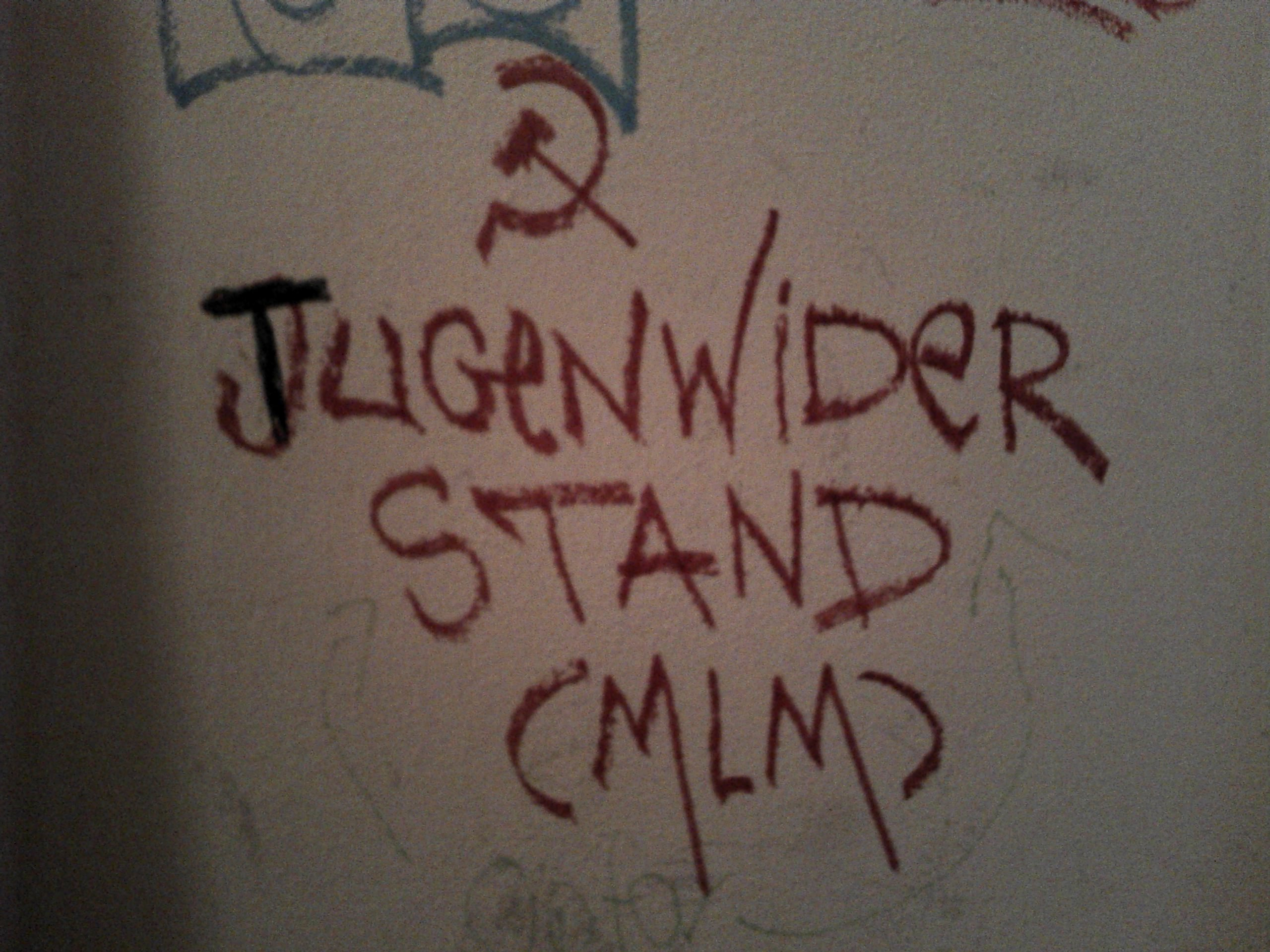
Graffiti of Youth Resistance in Berlin-Kreuzberg. MLM = marxistisch-leninistisch-maoistisch

Youth Resistance (German: Jugendwiderstand, abbreviated JW) was a Maoist youth group in Germany.

== History & overview ==
The JW was founded from a split in the Berlin branch of the Magdeburg-based group Fighting Together (Zusammen Kämpfen). The split was caused by an ideological conflict between more libertarian Marxist-oriented members and the more orthodox Marxist–Leninists. JW was primarily based in Berlin (predominantly in Wedding and Neukölln), but also listed branches in Bückeburg, Dresden, Flensburg, Hamburg, Magdeburg and Münster.

The ideology of JW was based upon the theory of Marxism-Leninism-Maoism (MLM). MLM is the universal application of the Mao-Zedong-Thought, with the principal theorist being the Peruvian Abimael Guzmán, chairman of the Communist Party of Peru (Shining Path).

JW was henceforth fiercely supportive of the revolutionary struggles of the Communist Party of the Philippines and the Naxalites in India. Other activities of JW were among others participation in the yearly May Day and Lenin-Luxemburg-Liebknecht (LLL) demonstrations, campaigning for election boycotts and anti-fascist organizing.

On 9 June 2019 JW announced on social media that it had dissolved. The main reason given by the organisation was that it could not make the transition between being an avant-garde youth organisation and an actual mass cadre communist party.

On the morning of the 26 June 2019 the police raided seven houses of nine JW members in Berlin and North Rhine-Westphalia. The police confiscated weapons, hard drives, mobile phones and disguises. The announced dissolution of JW is suspected of being a deception to complicate the ongoing police investigations.

== Criticisms ==
JW has been criticised of being homophobic, nationalistic, anti-semitic, sectarian, and violent towards other leftwing groups. The group is under surveillance of the Verfassungsschutz Berlin for being a radical left-wing anti-semitic organization. JW refutes these criticisms as being either untrue, or as being part of their legitimate political praxis (in the case of their violent disposition towards other leftwing groups). JW was noted for their repeated usage of words like "Volk" or "Vaterland" which are viewed as right-wing by many Germans. One member of the group was a former NPD member.

== See also ==
- Communist Party of Germany/Marxists–Leninists
- Marxist–Leninist Party of Germany
- Marxism–Leninism–Maoism
- Red Guards (United States)
