= J. Moufawad-Paul =

Canadian academic and writer

Joshua Moufawad-Paul

Education
- Education: York University Ph.D. Philosophy

Philosophical work
- Era: 21st-century philosophy
- School: Marxism–Leninism–Maoism
- Institutions: York University
- Main interests: Political philosophy, Maoism
- Notable ideas: Continuity and rupture
- Website: https://medium.com/@j.moufawadpaul

Joshua Moufawad-Paul is a Marxist academic and writer from Toronto, Canada. He is a professor of philosophy at York University. Moufawad-Paul espouses Marxism-Leninism-Maoism, seeing Shining Path's 1980s-1990s "People's War" against the Peruvian state as "heroic."

== Continuity and Rupture ==
Moufawad-Paul's 2016 book Continuity and Rupture: Philosophy in the Maoist Terrain provides a philosophical analysis of the theoretical foundation of Maoism, the Marxist school of thought developed by Chinese revolutionary Mao Zedong. Moufawad-Paul argues that the political ideology of Maoism, despite being formulated in the 1960s, only achieved full theoretical maturity in 1988 in Peru.

=== Synopsis ===
The book is introduced as an attempt by Moufawad-Paul to reclaim Maoism, as a contemporary political ideology and contest the negative conceptualizations by Trotskyists and Anarchists in the political left. For Moufawad-Paul, Maoism must be understood as being both a continuation of Leninist political, philosophical and strategic positions, while simultaneously, acting as a rupture from the dogmatic orthodoxy and theoretical limits of standard Marxism–Leninism, thus Maoism is characterized as both continuity and rupture. Throughout the work, Moufawad-Paul offers a critique of contemporary and historical Maoist organizations, such as The Revolutionary Communist Party USA, The Shining Path, The Naxalite insurgency in India, and The New People's Army, as well as contemporary Marxist intellectuals, Slavoj Zizek, Alain Badiou, and Tom Clark (author of State and Counter-Revolution).

=== Reception ===
J. Moufawad-Paul's work received a positive reception among Marxist critics.

Historian Roxanne Dunbar-Ortiz and social activist Gabriel Kuhn both provide positive blurbs of the book in the cover section.

Hamayon Rastgar in Marx and Philosophy gave a positive review of the book, writing, "Moufawad-Paul makes an appealing case for a return to the revolutionary kernel of communism through understanding the most contemporary stage of the development of the ideology and science of revolution, namely Maoism." Nicholas Marlatte wrote a positive review for Socialist Studies. In The Platypus Review, Marc Todoroff concluded that the book presented a persuasive defence of protracted people's war and revolutionary violence: "War is present; war is being waged against us. It is important to understand that socialism or barbarism really means 'socialism or planetary destruction.' State monopoly on violence cannot be allowed to persist."

The website Struggle Sessions (associated with the Red Guards) published a negative assessment of Moufawad-Paul's work in 2018.

== Bruce Gilley dispute ==
In 2020, Moufawad-Paul received media attention when he started a petition in response to publisher Rowman & Littlefield's planned "Problems in Anti-Colonialism" series. The petition urged the publisher to withdraw Bruce Gilley's book The Last Imperialist: Sir Alan Burns’ Epic Defense of the British Empire. Gilley had earlier written a controversial essay entitled The Case for Colonialism. The publisher ultimately scrapped the series. and Gilley's own book was published by Regnery Gateway instead.

== Publications ==
- The Communist Necessity (Montreal: Kersplebedeb, 2014)
- Continuity and Rupture (Winchester: Zero Books, 2016)
- Austerity Apparatus (Montreal: Kersplebedeb, 2017)
- Methods Devour Themselves (with Benjanun Sriduangkaew) (Winchester: Zero Books, 2018)
- Demarcation and Demystification (Winchester: Zero Books, 2019)
- Critique of Maoist Reason (Paris: Foreign Languages Press, 2020)
- Politics In Command: A Taxonomy of Economism (Paris: Foreign Languages Press, 2022)
