= Bruce Gilley =

American political scientist (born 1966)

- Gilley testifying before Congress, 2002.
- Born: July 21, 1966 (age 60); Montreal, Quebec, Canada

Academic background
- Education: University of Toronto (BA); University of Oxford (MPhil); Princeton University (PhD)

Academic work
- Discipline: Political science
- Institutions: Portland State University
- Website: Official website

Bruce Gilley (born July 21, 1966) is a Canadian-American professor of political science at Portland State University. He directed the university's PhD program in Public Affairs and Policy from 2012 to 2017. He re-established the Oregon Association of Scholars in 2016 and served as its president.

His 2017 article "The Case for Colonialism", published online by Third World Quarterly, advocated a revival of Western colonialism and prompted criticism from scholars. Fifteen members of the journal's editorial board resigned over its publication. The publisher subsequently withdrew the article, citing threats of violence against the editor.

Since then, historians have criticized Gilley's use of evidence and treatment of colonial violence.

== Biography ==
Gilley, a Canadian-born American of Scottish descent received his Bachelor of Arts in economics and international relations from the University of Toronto in 1988. As a Commonwealth Scholar he did his Master of Philosophy in economics at the University of Oxford from 1989 to 1991, and went to China to spend a year teaching English. From 1992 to 2002, he worked as a journalist in Hong Kong writing for the Eastern Express newspaper and then the Far Eastern Economic Review magazine, where his reporting included allegations of technology transfers involving a Stanford professor and China's military. Gilley was a Woodrow Wilson Scholar at Princeton University from 2004 to 2006, from where he received his PhD in politics in 2007. He joined the political science faculty of the Mark O. Hatfield School of Government at Portland State University in 2008. He was granted academic tenure in 2011 and promoted to full professor in 2016.

Gilley's research centers on comparative and international politics and public policy. His work covers issues as diverse as democracy, climate change, political legitimacy, and international conflict. He is a specialist on the politics of China and Asia. His 2006 article "The meaning and measure of state legitimacy: results for 72 countries" introduced a novel multidimensional, quantitative measure of the qualitative concept of political legitimacy. His work has since been extended by other scholars, and customized to specific geographical regions such as Latin America and Europe. Gilley himself has since updated his work on quantification of legitimacy with additional empirical data.

In February 2024, New College of Florida announced that Gilley would serve as a Presidential Scholar in Residence during the 2024–2025 academic year while on sabbatical from Portland State University. His appointment occurred during the college's conservative restructuring under trustees appointed by Florida governor Ron DeSantis.

== "The Case for Colonialism" ==
Gilley's article "The Case for Colonialism" was first published in an advance online version of the Third World Quarterly in 2017. According to Gilley, Western colonialism was generally both objectively beneficial and subjectively legitimate in most of the places where it was practiced. Consequently, the author calls for a revival of colonialism. The article was controversial both for its argument and for its subsequent withdrawal, and resulted in a debate about academic standards and peer review. Fifteen members of the journal's board resigned over the publishing of the paper. Critics described the article as low-quality and said that it was published, over the objections of reviewers, and as a form of academic clickbait.

=== Proposed colonial governance ===
Gilley's proposals included the creation of new territories under Western rule. He suggested that Guinea-Bissau could lease Galinhas Island to Portugal and allow mainland residents to move voluntarily to a territory governed through Portuguese institutions. He proposed that similar arrangements could be established along the coastlines of Africa and the Middle East.

=== Publication and withdrawal ===
The publisher and the resigning editorial board members gave differing accounts of the publication process. The board members stated that the paper had been rejected for a special issue and subsequently rejected by a reviewer as a "Viewpoint" essay. Taylor & Francis stated in its withdrawal notice that its investigation had confirmed that double-blind peer review had taken place in accordance with the journal's policy. The publisher attributed the withdrawal to credible threats of violence against the editor.

In 2017, Gilley requested that the journal withdraw his paper, saying, "I regret the pain and anger that it has caused for many people".

The article was re-published in the journal of conservative 501(c)(3) advocacy organization National Association of Scholars online in April 2018 then later in its Summer 2018 issue.

Asked by a journalist about a comparison between colonialism and genocide, Gilley rejected the analogy. He stated that "Genocide, I think everyone would agree, is a moral wrong", but argued that foreign rule was not inherently wrong.

=== Scholarly responses ===
Historian Berny Sèbe disputed Gilley's use of his research on the commemoration of European imperial figures in Africa. Sèbe argued that his interpretation of these commemorations as a form of cosmopolitan nation-building did not support a case for colonialism. Addressing Sèbe's criticism in his 2022 response, Gilley maintained that he had drawn different conclusions from Sèbe's findings rather than misrepresented the findings themselves. He acknowledged that he could have made this distinction clearer. Writing in Cato Unbound, philosopher James Stacey Taylor also challenged Gilley's interpretation of Michael Hechter's research. Taylor argued that Hechter's examples of legitimate foreign rule did not establish Gilley's broader assertion that foreign rule had often been legitimate.

In a 2018 response, historian Martin A. Klein rejected Gilley's argument for renewed colonial rule, arguing that it would serve neither former colonial powers nor formerly colonized populations. Klein also opposed the withdrawal of Gilley's article and favored scholarly criticism of its claims.

In a 2019 article in the International Review of Social History, historians Pepijn Brandon and Aditya Sarkar criticized Gilley's selective quotation and his neglect of evidence concerning famines, population displacement, violent partition, and genocidal campaigns. They argued that he treated the purported benefits of colonialism as structural while presenting atrocities as isolated departures from normal colonial rule. They also criticized his portrayal of diverse traditions of anticolonial scholarship as a uniform rejection of colonialism.

In the spring of 2022, Gilley responded to many of his critics in a second article entitled "The Case for Colonialism: A Response to My Critics". In 2023, he followed this with a full-length book, The Case for Colonialism, published by New English Press.

== The Last Imperialist ==
In 2020, plans for Rowman & Littlefield to publish Gilley's biography of Sir Alan Burns, The Last Imperialist: Sir Alan Burns's Epic Defense of the British Empire, ended following a petition organized by J. Moufawad-Paul. The petition opposed the publisher's proposed series on anticolonialism and accused Gilley of promoting a "white nationalist perspective". Gilley defended the book by saying that it had passed peer review and had been endorsed by historians Tirthankar Roy and Jeremy Black. Roy confirmed that it had been peer-reviewed and that he had endorsed it, and stated that he did not regard it as an apology for empires.

In a published response, Rowman & Littlefield president Jed Lyons said that the company had initially suspended publication to review concerns about scholarship and that it subsequently released Gilley from his contract at his request. Gilley said that he had requested the return of his rights after the book disappeared from the publisher's website and his requests for an explanation went unanswered. The book was published by conservative publishing house Regnery Gateway in September 2021.

== Political views ==
In a 2018 interview, Gilley described himself as a "classical liberal" and "an independent voter". In 2017, Gilley withdrew from the American Political Science Association, stating that he considered it to lack intellectual diversity and to possess an anti-conservative bias. He has criticized the use of diversity commitments in faculty hiring and promotion. Gilley has been critical of educational initiatives designed to enhance diversity, equity, and inclusion.

However, in a 2020 essay in First Things, Gilley also described himself as a conservative. In 2024, The Guardian described his commentary on X as right-wing.

=== Higher education ===
In 2019, Portland State declined to grant permanent status to Gilley's course on conservative political thought. Gilley argued that the university's diversity requirements amounted to an ideological test. The university cited deficiencies in his responses concerning inclusion and disability accommodations, as well as a missing statement about library resources, and said that he could resubmit the proposal. The course had already been taught twice, and Gilley said that he planned to teach it again under a temporary course number.

In his 2020 essay "Taking Power in the Academy", Gilley advocated abolishing university diversity, equity, and inclusion offices and excluding institutions that retained them from federal student-loan programs. He also called for ending academic departments that he described as "grievance studies".

Writing about his New College appointment in The American Conservative, Gilley described the changes at the college as a "Reconquista" and argued that conservatives should regain influence within public universities. He stated that his teaching would present different perspectives rather than promote conservative ideology.

=== Colonialism and slavery ===
In a September 2019 essay for the National Association of Scholars, titled "Was it Good Fortune to be Enslaved by the British Empire?", Gilley argued that Africans enslaved under the British Empire and their descendants had better prospects than they otherwise would have had. He also stated that this did not make their enslavement right.

In a 2022 essay in The New Republic, Michael Bérubé and Jennifer Ruth criticized Gilley's writings on slavery and colonialism. They questioned whether his public statements warranted protection under academic freedom, while distinguishing that question from their protection under the First Amendment.

=== German colonialism ===
On December 11, 2019, Gilley addressed an event organized by the parliamentary group of the far-right Alternative for Germany (AfD) in the Bundestag, where he defended Germany's colonial record. In a 2021 analysis, historian and sociologist Jonathan Hyslop argued that, although Gilley acknowledged that atrocities had occurred, he minimized the Herero and Nama genocide by treating those atrocities as an aberration attributable to General Lothar von Trotha, rather than German imperial policy. Hyslop criticized Gilley's claim that German political and military leaders opposed the atrocities as insufficiently supported. He also noted that Gilley blamed anticolonialism in Weimar Germany for undermining political stability and helping to prepare the way for Adolf Hitler.

On October 14, 2024, Gilley submitted testimony to the Bundestag's Committee on Foreign Affairs at the invitation of the AfD parliamentary group. He praised German colonial rule in Southwest Africa and criticized German reparations and development assistance policies. Writing in afrika süd, scholar Henning Melber criticized Gilley's praise for that colonial administration despite the German government's recognition that genocide had occurred there.

=== Hong Kong ===
Gilley has said that his years as a journalist in Hong Kong influenced his views about colonialism. During his stay, Britain transferred Hong Kong to the People's Republic of China on July 1, 1997. He recalled that residents' fears about the transfer of power made an impression on him.

=== 2024 Malaysian remarks ===
During an April 23, 2024, lecture at the University of Malaya in Kuala Lumpur, Gilley accused Malaysian political leaders of advocating a "second Holocaust against the Jewish people" and argued that this prevented Malaysia from becoming a partner of the United States. The university apologized, and the higher education ministry ordered it to cancel further programs involving him. His remarks referred to Malaysian leaders' support for Hamas during the Gaza war. Malaysian Prime Minister Anwar Ibrahim criticized him as a "mediocre scholar".

After leaving Malaysia, Gilley accused the Malaysian government of stirring up an "Islamo-fascist mob" and claimed that Malaysia was an unsafe destination. The United States Embassy subsequently stated that Malaysia remained at Level 1 of its travel advisory system, meaning that travelers should exercise normal precautions. Gilley said that he would not accept reimbursement from the university for his travel and lodging and sought donations through an online fundraiser.

== University of Oregon lawsuit ==
In August 2022, Gilley sued a former communications manager at the University of Oregon after its Division of Equity and Inclusion blocked him on Twitter following his response to a post about interrupting racism. His response quoted "all men are created equal". In March 2025, the parties settled. The university agreed to clarify its social media policies, train account managers, establish a procedure for contesting blocks, and have its insurer pay attorneys' fees. The settlement contained no admission of liability or fault.

== Memberships and awards ==
Gilley served on the editorial board of Journal of Democracy from 2007 to 2021 and has also served on the board of Journal of Contemporary China. He is a former president of the Oregon Association of Scholars, the state chapter of the National Association of Scholars. He was a founding signatory of the Oregon Academic Faculty Pledge on Freedom in 2020. He is the recipient of the following awards and nominations for scholarly achievement and articles: (Note: 1. College of Urban and Public Affairs Dean's Award for Scholarly Achievement – Senior Faculty (2016); 2. Frank Cass Prize, Best Article in Democratization (2010); 3. Best Dissertation in Comparative Politics (2007), Department of Politics, Princeton University; 4. Nominated for the Gabriel A. Almond Best Dissertation Award, American Political Science Association; 5. Marcel Cadieux Award, Best Article on Foreign Policy, Canadian Institute of International Affairs; 6. Woodrow Wilson Scholars Fellowship, Princeton University (2004–06); 7. Princeton University, East Asian Studies Prize (2002); and 8. Commonwealth Scholarship, University of Oxford (1989–1991))

- Commonwealth Scholarship, University of Oxford (1989–1991)
- East Asian Studies Prize, Princeton University (2002)
- Woodrow Wilson Scholars Fellowship, Princeton University (2004–2006)
- Marcel Cadieux Award, Best Article on Foreign Policy, Canadian Institute of International Affairs
- Nominated for Gabriel A. Almond Best Dissertation Award, American Political Science Association
- Best Dissertation in Comparative Politics, Department of Politics, Princeton University (2007)
- Frank Cass Prize, Best Article in Democratization (2010)
- Dean's Award for Scholarly Achievement – Senior Faculty, College of Urban and Public Affairs (2016)

In 2023, the National Association of Scholars identified Gilley as its national treasurer and a member of its board.

== Selected publications ==
=== Books ===
- Tiger on the Brink: Jiang Zemin and China's New Elite. University of California Press, 1998. ISBN 0520213955
- Model Rebels: The Rise and Fall of China's Richest Village. University of California Press, 2001. ISBN 978-0520225329
- China's New Rulers: The Secret Files. New York Review of Books, New York, 2003. (With Andrew Nathan) ISBN 978-1590170465
- China's Democratic Future: How It Will Happen and Where It Will Lead. Columbia University Press, 2004. ISBN 978-0231130844
- The Right to Rule: How States Win and Lose Legitimacy. Columbia University Press, 2009. ISBN 978-0231138727
- The Nature of Asian Politics. Cambridge University Press, 2014. ISBN 978-0521761710
- The Last Imperialist: Sir Alan Burns's Epic Defense of the British Empire. Regnery Gateway, 2021. ISBN 978-1684512171
- In Defense of German Colonialism: And How Its Critics Empowered Nazis, Communists, and the Enemies of the West. Regnery Gateway, 2022. ISBN 978-1684512379
- The Case for Colonialism. New English Review Press, 2023. ISBN 978-1943003907

=== Edited books ===
- Middle Powers and the Rise of China. Georgetown University Press, Washington DC, 2014. (With Andrew O'Neil)
- Political Change in China: Comparisons With Taiwan. Lynne Rienner, Boulder, 2008. (With Larry Diamond)
- Asia's Giants: Comparing China and India. Palgrave Macmillan, New York, 2005. (With Edward Friedman)

=== Articles ===
- "Against the Concept of Ethnic Conflict", Third World Quarterly. 25 (6): 1155–1166. doi:10.1080/0143659042000256959. Archived from the original on January 20, 2018.
- "The Case for Colonialism", Third World Quarterly, 2017. (Republished in Academic Questions, June 2018, Vol. 31, No. 2, pp. 167–185.)
- The Case For Colonialism In The Middle East, A Hoover Institution essay from the caravan notebook, August 2020.
- "The Case for Colonialism: A Response to My Critics", Academic Questions, Spring 2022.
- "King Hochschild’s Hoax", The American Conservative, April 17, 2023.
- The Ghost Still Haunts: Adam Hochschild responds to Bruce Gilley, who follows in kind., The American Conservative, May 29, 2023.

=== Bibliography ===
- Contributions of Western Colonialism to Human Flourishing: A Research Bibliography. Version 4.0, January 2023.

== See also ==
- Nigel Biggar
- Colonialism
- Joseph McQuade: A counterargument to A Case For Colonialism
