= New Peru Friendship Association =

Communist international organization

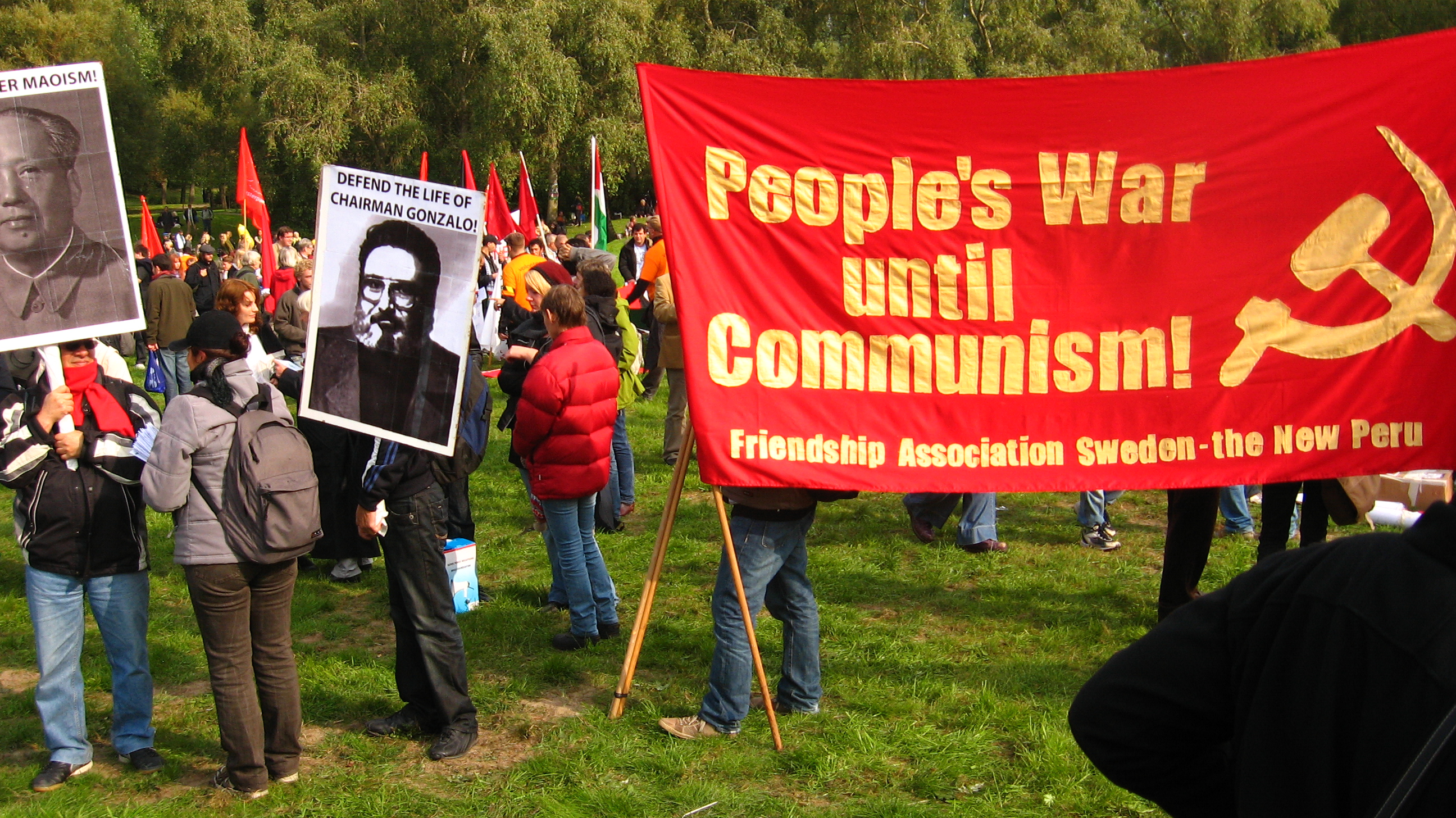
Demonstration of the "Friendship Association Sweden - the New Peru"

The New Peru Friendship Association is a union of series of Marxist–Leninist–Maoist organizations that support the Peruvian insurgent group Shining Path that operate in different countries. This group is in charge of collecting money and sending money clandestinely to the terrorist group. They are also in charge of spreading Abimael Guzmán's line of Marxism-Leninism-Maoism throughout the world.

== Members ==
- "“New Peru” Friendship Association of Madrid"
- "New Peru Friendship Association (USA)"
- "Friendship Association Sweden - the New Peru"
- "Friendship Association Denmark - the People's Republic of Peru under Formation (VDPF)"

Associations of the same type also exist in Bangladesh, Nepal, Turkey, Germany, Italy and Sweden.
