= Philippine Society and Revolution =

1971 book by Jose Maria Sison

- Author: Amado Guerrero
- Language: English
- Publisher: Pulang Tala Publications
- Publication date: 1971
- Publication place: Philippines

Philippine Society and Revolution (translated in Filipino as Lipunan at Rebolusyong Pilipino), first published in 1971, is a book written by Filipino Maoist revolutionary and founder of the Communist Party of the Philippines Jose Maria Sison, under his nom de guerre Amado Guerrero. Regarded as one of the CPP's principal references, PSR has also influenced the Filipino mass movement since its first publication. It applied Maoist analysis to contemporary Filipino society, describing its class structure, its basic problems, and the "class logic of the revolutionary solution — which is the people's democratic revolution."

The book was first written in the aftermath of the First Quarter Storm in 1970 and the reestablishment of the Communist Party of the Philippines in 1968. It first appeared in The Philippine Collegian under the title Philippine Crisis and Revolution. In it, Guerrero applied Marxist class analysis to Filipino society, and described Philippine history from a historical materialist lens. Guerrero then summarized the "basic problems of the Filipino people" as US imperialism, feudalism, and bureaucrat capitalism. In the last part, Guerrero advocates for a stage of people's democratic revolution with a socialist perspective.

The national democratic mass movement takes its cues from the thesis laid out by Guerrero in Philippine Society and Revolution. The Communist Party of the Philippines cites PSR, alongside Guerrero's other documents, Specific Characteristics of our People's War and Our Urgent Tasks as guides in "laying down the basic principles of the two-stage revolution in the Philippines based on the analysis of concrete conditions of the semi-colonial and semi-feudal system."

== Summary ==
The Short Course on Philippine Society and Revolution, a primer summarizing the core principles in PSR, breaks down the concepts into four parts:

1. The Philippines is rich but the Filipino people are poor
2. The history of the Filipino people is the history of class struggle between the minority ruling class and the majority exploited class
3. US imperialism, feudalism, and bureaucrat capitalism are the roots of the Filipino people's oppression
4. The People's Democratic Revolution is the only solution to the three basic problems of the Filipino people

== Background ==
On December 26, 1968, Jose Maria Sison and others reestablished the Communist Party of the Philippines along Marxist–Leninist-Maoist lines. Sison was a member of the old Partido Komunista ng Pilipinas-1930's Central Committee, but ideological splits resulted in his expulsion in 1967 and the First Great Rectification Movement, culminating in the formation of the CPP.

Aboveground, Sison was known as the founder of Kabataang Makabayan, a nationalist youth organization that was partly inspired by nationalists like Claro M. Recto and Teodoro Agoncillo. In 1967, a collection of Sison's speeches and essays was published under the title Struggle for National Democracy. SND detailed many of the relevant points of what would eventually become the national democratic movement. Sison himself, in the third edition of SND, called the book "a direct precursor to Philippine Society and Revolution."

As a member of the PKP, Guerrero wrote a document detailing the history of the Communist Party, an assessment of its mistakes, and recommendations. The document would become the nucleus of the First Great Rectification Movement, owing to the PKP leadership's refusal to discuss the document. Shortly after the foundation of the CPP, the document would be released as Rectify Errors, Rebuild the Party!

Both Struggle for National Democracy and Rectify Errors became the basis of Philippine Society and Revolution. According to Sison, "SND paved the way for the exposition of the people's basic problems and the possible revolutionary solution in legal and persuasive language" while RERP "laid down what must be done in order to realize the ideological, political and organizational requirements to rebuild the revolutionary party of the proletariat, the people's army and the united front and to rekindle and advance the revolution towards victory"

== Writing and publication ==
=== Publication history ===
Sison first began writing what became Philippine Society and Revolution shortly after the formation of the New People's Army in March 1969, finishing a rough draft by August. Sison was aided by other members of the CPP's Central Committee in collating resources and editing the final draft.

The first edition of PSR was published via mimeograph in October 1969. A copy was sent to The Philippine Collegian, the University of the Philippines Diliman's official student publication and serialized as Philippine Crisis and Revolution in July 1970. By the end of the year, the serialized chapters were compiled into one volume and mimeographed under the imprint "Revolutionary School of Mao Tse-Tung Thought." Ta Kung Pao also serialized Philippine Society and Revolution in 1970. In 1971, Pulang Tala Publications published the first book version.

In 1972, Bandilang Pula Publishing released an edition of PSR. The next year, a German translation was published by Der Verlag Kommunistiche Texte. In 1977, according to Sison, Katipunan ng Demokratikong Pilipino published a version in the United States. A Turkish translation also exists.

The International Association of Filipino Patriots has published a third and fourth edition of Philippine Society and Revolution. The third edition included Sison's essay Specific Characteristics of our People's War, while the fourth edition includes another essay, Our Urgent Tasks. According to them, the three works represent "the Philippine revolutionary leadership's continuing efforts to grasp the particularities of the Philippine revolution."

A Filipino translation was first published by the CPP Central Publishing House in 1971. Lathaang Pulang Tala also released an edition of Lipunan at Rebolusyong Pilipino in 1971. In 1982, the CPP's National Commission on Translation published a 3rd edition of LRP, and a fourth edition in 1994.

A fifth edition of the English version was published in 2006, published by Aklat ng Bayan and signed under Sison's name.

=== Claims of plagiarism ===
Some have accused Sison of plagiarizing the text of Philippine Society and Revolution from other sources. Alex Magno stated that Sison "plagiarized the work of an Indonesian Maoist who, in turn, simplistically applied Mao's elementary analysis of Chinese society to explain Indonesian society." It is generally assumed that Magno is referring to Indonesian communist D. N. Aidit's 1957 work entitled Indonesian Society and Indonesian Revolution.

Joseph Scalice notes that PSR and MIRI's structure both followed a pattern first established by Mao Zedong in his 1939 work The Chinese Revolution and the Chinese Communist Party. He however states that the accusations of plagiarism are "absurd". Ramon Guillermo similarly concluded that accusations of plagiarism had no basis after conducting an n-gram analysis of the two texts. He noted that many of the phrases occurring in both PSR and MIRI are "fixed phrases in the English language as a whole or within the genre of late twentieth-century Marxist-Leninist revolutionary texts" such as "the broad masses of the people", "under the leadership of", "exploitation of the people", and "of the world proletarian revolution". Both Scalice and Guillermo also note that a key difference between the two texts is Sison's analysis of Philippine history.

Sison himself countered the accusations, stating "If one compares PSR, MIRI, and the writings of Mao about the classes in Chinese society and the new democratic revolution, one would immediately observe surface similarities because they all used Marxist-Leninist theory in analyzing the history, circumstances and revolutionary future of the semicolonial and semifeudal societies of China, Indonesia, and the Philippines. But a deeper study of these works will reveal big differences." He noted that he read and studied "the self-criticism of the PKI Politburo in 1966 which showed Aidit's errors in ideology, politics, and organization" following the 1965–66 Indonesian mass killings.

== Content ==
=== A Review of Philippine History ===
Philippine Society and Revolution begins with a description of the Philippines' geographic and demographic features. Guerrero explained the peopling of the Philippine archipelago by using H. Otley Beyer's wave migration theory, which has since been criticized by anthropologists like William Henry Scott and is no longer accepted by the scientific community.

Guerrero then presents a historical materialist overview of Philippine history. He emphasizes the societal attainment of various states in the Philippine archipelago prior to Spanish arrival, calling it a mix of primitive communal societies, semicommunal and semislave society, and feudal society. The arrival of Spanish colonialism fundamentally transformed Philippine society into a colonial and feudal state. The Spanish, and particularly the friar class, held firm control of both the material base and superstructure

The Philippines under Spanish colonial rule experienced over 200 revolts, which created a "revolutionary tradition among the Filipino people." The 19th century saw the "embryo of the Filipino proletariat" owing to developments in transportation, infrastructure, and the proliferation of industries. The Philippines began to transition towards a semi-feudal economy. Greater economic opportunities resulted in the rise of the ilustrado class of intellectuals. Discontent at the colonial regime resulted in the Propaganda Movement, headed by Jose Rizal and other ilustrados, but ultimately failed to secure reforms.

These events culminated in the Philippine Revolution of 1896, which Guerrero described as a "national-democratic revolution of the old type," stating that the Katipunan was "guided by the ideology of the liberal bourgeoisie" despite its leader Andres Bonifacio's proletarian origins. Revolutionary leadership was seized by Emilio Aguinaldo, an ilustrado, leading to the 1897 Pact of Biak-na-Bato and Aguinaldo's exile in Hong Kong. During this time, George Dewey approached the Hong Kong Junta under the guise of helping "the Filipino people liberate themselves from the Spanish colonial rule." This resulted in the creation of the First Philippine Republic and the subsequent Filipino–American War.

The Filipino-American War resulted in the Philippines becoming a colony of the United States. US imperialism frustrated the national and democratic aspirations of the Filipino people in its interest for raw materials, a market for surplus product, and investment for surplus capital. The old feudal structure became subordinate to US imperialism in order to extract surplus raw materials via the landlord and comprador class. The rise of the comprador class and an increase in the Filipino proletariat helped transition the Philippines towards semi-feudalism.

Class oppression by US imperialism and its local lackeys - the comprador big bourgeoisie, the landlord class, and big puppet bureaucrats, manifested in the formation of the Partido Komunista ng Pilipinas-1930 by Crisanto Evangelista. The PKP raised the level of the Philippine Revolution towards a new type of national-democratic revolution in the era of imperialism.

The rise of fascism and imperialist competition resulted in the Empire of Japan launching a surprise attack on the Philippines on December 7, 1941, as part of the Second World War. Top PKP leaders, including Evangelista, were arrested. Nevertheless, the PKP resolved to form the Hukbalahap on March 29, 1942. The Huks were successful in liberating Central Luzon despite strategic and tactical errors.

By the end of the war, US imperialism returned to assert control in the Philippines, before granting it its independence in 1946 as part of the Tydings-McDuffie Act. Thus the Philippines entered a new stage of semi-colonial subservience to the United States. Guerrero then goes on to describe how each successive administration since independence has served US interests.

The chapter ends with the reestablishment of the Communist Party of the Philippines, calling it the "most significant development so far in the Philippine Revolution"

=== Basic Problems of the Filipino People ===
In the second chapter, Guerrero describes Philippine society and its fundamental problems. He first describes the Philippines as semi-colonial and semi-feudal. He goes on to state that this is maintained by US imperialism, feudalism, and bureaucrat capitalism, before going on to describe semi-colonialism and semi-feudalism.

Having established the three basic problems of the Filipino people and their relationship to each other, Guerrero goes on to detail how US imperialism, feudalism, and bureaucrat capitalism exploit Filipino society.

=== People's Democratic Revolution ===
Guerrero states that the Philippine Revolution "cannot but take a national-democratic character", calling it a national revolution because of its aim "to assert national sovereignty against U.S. imperialism and its local running dogs," and democratic because of its aim to "fulfill the peasant struggle for land against domestic feudalism" and "uphold the democratic rights of the broad masses of the people against fascism." He calls the present stage of the Philippine Revolution "is a continuation and resumption of the Philippine Revolution of 1896 and the Filipino-American War, both of which ended in failure under the leadership of the local bourgeoisie."

He describes the present national-democratic revolution as of a new type and must have the class leadership of the proletariat. He asserts that " U.S. imperialism, feudalism and bureaucrat capitalism cannot be overthrown unless the broad masses of the people are led by the revolutionary party of the proletariat, the Communist Party of the Philippines, under the supreme guidance of Marxism-Leninism-Mao Tse Tung Thought.

He clarifies that the present stage of the national-democratic revolution is not a socialist revolution, saying that "only after the national-democratic stage has been completed can the proletarian revolutionary leadership carry out the socialist revolution as the transitional stage towards communism."

Guerrero then goes on to provide class analysis of Philippine society. He separates Philippine society to the following strata:

1. The landlord class
2. The bourgeoisie
  1. Comprador big bourgeoisie
  2. Middle bourgeoise
  3. Petty bourgeoise
3. The peasantry
  1. Rich peasants
  2. Middle peasants
  3. Poor peasants
4. The proletariat
  1. Semiproletariat
  2. Lumpenproletariat
5. Special social groups

Based on this class analysis, Guerrero describes class strategy and tactics of the revolution, emphasizing three things: a.) Class leadership of the Communist Party, b.) the necessity of armed struggle, and c.) the basic alliance of workers and peasants, and the national united front, and explaining each component in detail. He goes on to state that the Communist Party of the Philippines, the New People's Army, and the national united front are the three "magic weapons" of the Philippine Revolution.

The chapter then describes the goals and the perspective of the Philippine revolution. Politically, it aims to establish a people's democratic government "under the leadership of the proletariat and which harmonizes the interests of all revolutionary classes and strata." Militarily, Guerrero states that the NPA's principal task is seizing political power and consolidating it. Economically, Guerrero advocates the nationalization of large enterprises and land reform. Culturally, a " national, scientific and mass culture must overwhelm and overthrow the imperialist, feudal and anti-people culture that now prevails." In foreign relations, Guerrero states that the people's democratic government must abide by the Five Principles of Peaceful Coexistence.

In the last section of Philippine Society and Revolution, Guerrero clarifies that the present stage of the Philippine Revolution will transition towards socialist revolution and has a socialist perspective. The text ends by stating that "imperialism is heading for total collapse and socialism is marching toward world victory" and that the world proletarian revolution is advancing, hastening the "advent of socialism in the Philippines."

== Influence and criticism ==
The ideas laid down in Philippine Society and Revolution have shaped Philippine politics since its first publication. The Communist Party of the Philippines considers PSR its "principal reference and guide in laying down the basic principles of the two-stage revolution in the Philippines based on the analysis of concrete conditions of the semi-colonial and semi-feudal system."

The national democratic movement, partly inspired by both Struggle for National Democracy and Philippine Society and Revolution, agrees with many of the same analyses as Sison, but does not engage in armed struggle to achieve its aims. Many activists from the Martial law era up to the present look to PSR as a "guide and roadmap."

Professor E. San Juan Jr. has called the book Sison's "signal accomplishment", stating that only with PSR did "the Filipino masses finally acquire a counter- hegemonic voice, freeing the energies of its long-repressed incarnate Geist, and enabling the rekindling of revolutionary agency."

The National Democratic School (Pambansang Demokratikong Paaralan, PADEPA), a series of educational discussions and courses for activists, includes a Short Course on Philippine Society and Revolution (Maikling Kurso sa Lipunan at Rebolusyong Pilipino, MKLRP) in its curriculum. The fourth edition of MKLRP was released in September 2019.

Some have criticized Guerrero's conclusions in PSR. Filemon Lagman, a former CPP cadre who left in the wake of the Second Great Rectification Movement, published a series of counter-theses in 1994. His PSR: The Semifeudal Alibi for Protracted War questioned Sison's assertion that the Philippines was semi-feudal, and insisted that the country actually had a backwards capitalist system similar to Russia prior to the Russian Revolution. Others have criticized PSR's polemical nature. Scalice calls PSR a "nationalist document" at its core, and criticized it as being "concerned with neither the history of Marxism nor of global developments."
