= Benjanun Sriduangkaew =

Thai science fiction and fantasy writer

- Born: Pattani Province, Thailand
- Occupation: Writer
- Writing career
- Years active: 2012–present
- Genres: Science fiction; fantasy
- Website: beekian.wordpress.com

Benjanun Sriduangkaew is a Thai science fiction and fantasy writer, who is also known for her controversial online criticism. She was a finalist for the 2014 John W. Campbell Award for Best New Writer and the 2014 BSFA Award for Best Short Fiction, for Scale-Bright.

== Life ==
Sriduangkaew was born in Pattani province in southern Thailand. After attending university in Bangkok, she worked in Manila, Jakarta, and Hong Kong. In 2013, Sriduangkaew said that she had earned her bachelor's degree "some twelve years ago" and that she had not been fluent in English at the time.

== Work ==
Sriduangkaew began publishing short fiction in 2012, with "Courtship in the Country of the Machine Gods", and established a reputation for herself with a string of high-profile short stories in Clarkesworld Magazine and elsewhere, which led to her nomination for the John W. Campbell Award.

Her first long-form publication was the urban fantasy novella Scale-Bright, published in 2014. A follow-up to her three Sun-Moon Cycle stories, it is a love story about a young woman from Hong Kong who has to rescue her sister from Heaven. Reviewing the novella for Tor.com, Niall Alexander described it as "an achievement without equal", appreciating its "delicately drawn characters", "affecting narrative", and the author's prose skills.

Her second novella, Winterglass, was published in 2017. It is a science fantasy retelling of the story of the Snow Queen. A Publishers Weekly's reviewer considered that the "promising novella" provided "variations on the theme of strong female characters" but was marred by an "uneven plot and some missed opportunities for complex worldbuilding".

Her third novella, And Shall Machines Surrender, was published in 2019. It is a science fiction story focusing on artificial intelligences and their relationships to humanity. Reviewing the novella in The Future Fire, J. Moufawad-Paul wrote: "And Shall Machines Surrender is the perfect example of how much can possibly be packed into a novella. The equal depth of style, story, characterization, and world-building is quite striking"; and, "Due to the strength of And Shall Machines Surrender — its clarity and intricacy, its ability to compress complexity into a minimalist structure — it is almost criminal that Sriduangkaew is not a household name".

== Online activity ==
In 2014, Sriduangkaew was revealed to have been the controversial blogger and book reviewer "Requires Hate" (also known as "Requires Only That You Hate", as well as "Winterfox"). Using these internet identities, she published violent critiques of what she considered to be racist, sexist, heteronormative, or colonial themes in works of science fiction and fantasy; these critiques included both personal insults and threats of murder and rape. Media outlets and social media users referred to Sriduangkaew as a "notorious troll". Many of her targets were themselves young, female, transgender, or persons of color. In reporting on Sriduangkaew's online activities, the Daily Dot wrote that it is not certain whether or not she is indeed a Thai writer, or whether Benjanun Sriduangkaew is a pseudonym or her real name.

In October 2014, Sriduangkaew posted an apology on her blog, admitting to being "a horrendous asshole" and causing pain to others, but also denied certain allegations that she had made rape threats, stating that other accounts had impersonated her. She shut down her original "Requires Only That You Hate" blog but started another under a new title, which remained active until 2020.

A blog post by fellow writer Laura J. Mixon critiquing Sriduangkaew's behavior won Mixon the 2015 Hugo Award for Best Fan Writer.

Reaction to the revelation of Sriduangkaew's alternate online identities caused consternation among science fiction writers and fans. In a blog post in 2015, Sriduangkaew claimed she had become the target of harassment and cyberstalking campaigns after her internet identities were revealed, while conceding that "I've been shitty in the past".

== Bibliography ==
Novels

- Machine's Last Testament, Prime Books (2020), ISBN 9781607015390

Novellas

- Scale-Bright, Immersion Press (2014), ISBN 9780956392497
- Winterglass, Apex Publications (2017), ISBN 9781937009625
- And Shall Machines Surrender, Prime Books (2019), ISBN 9781607015345
- Mirrorstrike, Apex Publications (2019), ISBN 9781937009731
- Now Will Machines Hollow the Beast, Prime Books (2020), ISBN 9781607015437
- Shall Machines Divide the Earth, Prime Books (2021), ISBN 9781607015451
- Where Machines Redeem the Lost, Prime Books (2021), ISBN 9781607015482
- Shattersteel, Apex Book Company (2021), ISBN 9781937009977
- Now Will Machines Devour the Stars, Prime Books (2022), ASIN B09MNXPRTL
- More Than Utopia, Prime Books (2022), ASIN B0B37V25YC
- Shall Machines Bite the Sun, Prime Books (2022), ASIN B09WZ8SC5V
- If Else Paradise, Prime Books (2023), ASIN B0BTMMGZQB

Novelettes

- Then Will the Sun Rise Alabaster, Prime Books (2019), ISBN 9781607015376

Collaborations

- Methods Devour Themselves (with J. Moufawad-Paul), Zero Books (2018), ISBN 9781785358265
- The Gunrunner and Her Hound (with Devi Lacroix as Maria Ying) (2021), ISBN 9798431303012
- The Spy and Her Serpent (with Devi Lacroix as Maria Ying) (2022), ISBN 9798430822743
- The Grace of Sorcerers (with Devi Lacroix as Maria Ying) (2022), ISBN 9798449201799
- The Might of Monsters (with Devi Lacroix as Maria Ying) (2022), ISBN 9798449206213
- Shadow of Gorgon (with Emily Faas as Selene Tang) (2023), ISBN 9798394265259
- The Ruin of Beasts (with Devi Lacroix as Maria Ying) (2023), ISBN 9798866970841
- Blood of Gorgon (with Emily Faas as Selene Tang) (2024), ISBN 9798325129209
- The Hades Calculus (with Devi Lacroix as Maria Ying) (2024), ISBN 9798329446005
- Memory of Olympus (with Devi Lacroix as Maria Ying) (2025), ASIN B0D8GCJYC1

Collections

- The Archer Who Shot Down Suns: Scale-Bright Stories (2014), collecting the stories "The Crows Her Dragon's Gate", "Woman of the Sun, Woman of the Moon", and "Chang'e Dashes from the Moon", ISBN 9781311268914

Short fiction

- "Chang'e Dashes from the Moon" (2012)
- "Courtship in the Country of Machine-Gods" (2012)
- "Woman of the Sun, Woman of the Moon" (2012)
- "Fade to Gold" (2013)
- "Annex" (2013)
- "The Crows Her Dragon's Gate" (2013)
- "Vector" (2013)
- "The Bees Her Heart, the Hive Her Belly" (2013)
- "Silent Bridge, Pale Cascade" (2013)
- "Autodidact" (2014)
- "Golden Daughter, Stone Wife" (2014)
- "When We Harvested the Nacre-Rice" (2014)
- "Synecdoche Oracles" (2014)
- "And the Burned Moths Remain" (2015)
- "The Petals Abide" (2015), Clarkesworld
- "The Insurrectionist and the Empress Who Reigns Over Time" (2015)
- "The Occidental Bride" (2015)
- "The Beast at the End of Time" (2016)
- "Dream Command" (2016)
- "The Finch's Wedding and the Hive That Sings" (2016)
- "That Which Stands Tends Toward Free Fall" (2016)
- "Comet's Call" (2016)
- "Under She Who Devours Suns" (2016)
- "The Prince Who Gave Up Her Empire" (2016)
- "We Are All Wasteland On The Inside" (2016)
- "Parable of the Cocoon" (2017)
- "The Sun Shall Lie Across Us Like Gold" (2017)
- "The Universe as Vast as Our Longings" (2017)
- "No Pearls as Blue as These" (2017)
- "After-Swarm" (2017)
- "You and I Shall be as Radiant" (2017)
- "The Owls of Juttshatan" (2018)
- "Red as Water, White as Ruin" (2018)
- "The Five Secret Truths of Demonkind" (2018)
- "Tiger, Tiger Bright" (2019)
- "Where Machines Run with Gold" (2019)
- "That August Song" (2019)
- "We Will Become as Monsters" (2020)
- "The City Still Dreams of Her Name" (2020)
