= Third World Quarterly =

Academic journal

- Discipline: International relations, development studies
- Language: English
- Edited by: Shahid Qadir

Publication details
- History: 1979–present
- Publisher: Taylor & Francis on behalf of Global South Ltd
- Frequency: Monthly
- Impact factor: 2.4 (2025)

Standard abbreviations
- ISO 4: Third World Q.

Indexing
- ISSN: 0143-6597 (print); 1360-2241 (web)
- LCCN: 80640150
- JSTOR: 01436597
- OCLC no.: 615555785

Links
- Journal homepage; Online archives

Third World Quarterly (TWQ) is a peer-reviewed academic journal managed by Global South Ltd and published by Taylor & Francis. The journal was founded in 1978 by the Pakistani journalist and former civil servant Altaf Gauhar. Its founding editor and chair of its editorial board is Shahid Qadir, who is also one of two directors of Global South Ltd.

Third World Quarterly is a leading journal in the field of Global South studies, focusing on the "historical and contemporary structures and relations of inequality and development" and covering international relations, development studies, gender studies, race studies, heterodox economics, and historical and sociocultural research.

Although the journal's title suggests four issues per year, it is in fact published monthly. The journal had an impact factor of 2.4 in 2025.

== History ==
The journal was founded by the Pakistani journalist and former civil servant Altaf Gauhar. According to his obituary in The Guardian, Gauhar came to London in the mid-1970s and, with financial support from the Bank of Credit and Commerce International, launched a number of initiatives intended to draw attention to the problems facing developing countries; these included Third World Quarterly, the monthly magazine South, and the Third World Foundation.

Other early founders included Commonwealth Secretary-General Shridath Ramphal and Pakistani Finance Minister Mahbub ul-Haq. The publication has a tradition of featuring progressive and exploratory content that is anti-racist, anti-imperialist, and anti-sexist. Edward Said was a member of the publication's founding editorial board.

The journal was launched in December 1978. Shahid Qadir joined as associate editor and became editor-in-chief in 1990. He held the title of editor from 1990 to 2020 and has been described as founding editor since 2020. Originally published quarterly, the journal moved to twelve issues per year in 2015.

In September 2017, the journal published an article entitled "The Case for Colonialism" by political scientist Bruce Gilley. This article was described by Portia Roelofs and Max Gallien of the London School of Economics as "a travesty, the academic equivalent of a Trump tweet, clickbait with footnotes." Oxford theologian Nigel Biggar himself became the subject of controversy after defending Gilley's article. A large number of the journal's editorial board resigned in protest, citing a flawed peer review process for the colonialism submission and inaccurate statements from the editor-in-chief, Shahid Qadir. 15 out of the 34 members of the editorial board were signatories to the resignation letter, and a petition to retract the piece at Change.org had more than 10,000 supporters.

Board member Noam Chomsky opposed the retraction, saying: "Rebuttal offers a great opportunity for education, not only in this case." The article was subsequently withdrawn by Gilley. Taylor & Francis stated that its investigation had found the essay underwent double-blind peer review in line with the journal's editorial policy, but that the article was being withdrawn because the journal editor had received credible threats of personal violence linked to its publication.

== Abstracting and indexing ==
A Current Bibliography on African Affairs, ABC POL SCI: A Bibliography of Contents: Political Science & Government, America: History and Life, Asian Business Contents, British Humanities Index, Historical Abstracts, International Development Abstracts, International Political Science Abstracts, Periodica Islamica, Political Science Abstracts, Sage Public Administration Abstracts, Social Policy/Planning & Development Abstracts, Social Science Citation Index and Sociological Abstracts.

== Prize ==
The Third World Prize honors individuals and institutions that have made outstanding contributions to development in the Third World—particularly in the economic, social, political, or scientific spheres. Recipients include notable figures such as Argentine economist Raúl Prebisch (1982), recognized for formulating dependency theory; Norwegian Prime Minister Gro Harlem Brundtland (1989), honored for her commitment to environmental sustainability; and Nelson and Winnie Mandela (1985), awarded for their lifelong struggle against apartheid.
