= Ang Bayan =

National publication of the Communist Party of the Philippines

- "Pahayagan ng Partido Komunista ng Pilipinas, Pinapatnubayan ng Marxismo-Leninismo-Maoismo"

- Front page of Ang Bayan, August 21, 2019 issue
- Type: Bimonthly with special issues
- Owner: Communist Party of the Philippines
- Founded: May 1969
- Political alignment: Far-left
- Language: Filipino, English, Cebuano, Ilokano, Waray, and Hiligaynon
- Country: Philippines
- Circulation: Nationwide
- Website: philippinerevolution.nu

Ang Bayan ('The Nation') is the official news organ of the Communist Party of the Philippines, issued by the party's Central Committee. It describes the actions of party as well as its point of view on issues and events in the Philippines. It serves as the national publication of the CPP, with other regional publications focusing on specific regional news.

Ang Bayan is published semimonthly on the 7th and 21st of each month with additional "special issues" when an important event occurs. It is always originally published in Filipino but is subsequently translated into English, Cebuano, Ilokano, Waray and Hiligaynon.

== History ==
Ang Bayan was founded by CPP Founding Chairman Jose Maria Sison, under the nom de guerre Amado Guerrero on May 1, 1969, following the events of the First Great Rectification Movement and the formation of the New People's Army. Guerrero saw the need for a periodical to propagate the Party's basic principles and program for revolution.

Ang Bayan was first published every few months on mimeograph and consisted of four sections: editorials, local news, international news, and CPP documents. Its first issue was published in Central Luzon. From its inception until 1975, Guerrero served as the editor-in-chief of the paper, while also contributing heavily to the articles being published.

From 1969 to 1972, Ang Bayan served chiefly as the vehicle for the theoretical foundations of the CPP. Its news articles, through Guerrero's writing, also defied conventional journalistic convention and were politically loaded. It also defied conventions in construction of leads, writing reports, and so on, owing to the volunteer nature of the publication, its purpose as a propaganda tool, and Guerrero's own lack of experience as a journalist.

In 1976, editorship passed on to Antonio Zumel, a veteran journalist and organizer. Zumel was President of the National Press Club from 1969 to 1971 until he was forced underground due to the declaration of martial law in 1972. Zumel instituted reforms in the Ang Bayan and expanded the editorial team, getting other veteran journalists to write with him. Guerrero's involvement was lessened but he still played a key role in guiding the political line of the publication.

Under Zumel, Ang Bayan was published biweekly. The birth of Rebolusyon, the CPP's theoretical journal, also freed Ang Bayan from theoretical discussions which were the norm under Sison. Writers for regional publications were also deputized as Ang Bayan correspondents under Zumel. Zumel also ensured that style conventions and basic journalistic principles were followed in news published by Ang Bayan. He also introduced soft news and human-interest stories in the publication.

In 1998, Ang Bayan was being published quarterly. A decision was made and the publication began to be published online through the National Democratic Front's official website. Gregorio Rosal, or Ka Roger, headed the shift in online work. By 2001, issues of Ang Bayan were being published along with statements from the CPP, NPA, and NDF through its website, Philippine Revolution Web Central. This also allowed Ang Bayan to be published more frequently, owing to the ease of news-gathering and access, leading to the present schedule of bimonthly publication.

== Distribution ==
During the early years of Ang Bayan, the CPP's Central Publishing House (CPH) produced anywhere from 500 to 1,000 copies per issue. This was eventually decentralized to different regions as the Party grew in size and strength. The CPH began focusing on creating stencil master copies and distributing them to regional bases to be reproduced using V-type silkscreens, increasing overall reproduction.

Today, issues of Ang Bayan can readily be found online through the CPP's official website and on the Internet Archive.
