= Communist Platform (Norway) =

Norwegian political platform

The Communist Platform (Norwegian: Kommunistisk plattform, KP) is a political platform and organization in Norway formed after the dissolution of the old Workers' Communist Party (AKP) on March 10, 2007 and its decision to merge into the new "broader" party Red.

Some people of the opposition within the AKP and from the party's student's league, NKS, together with the Marxist-Leninist Group Revolusjon decided to form the Kommunistisk plattform. KP's goal is to form a new communist party in Norway.

The platform convened its first annual assembly and elected a new leadership in February 2008.
