= Socialist Studies (Society for Socialist Studies journal) =

Socialist Studies/Études socialistes
- Discipline: Political science
- Language: English, French
- Edited by: Elaine Coburn

Publication details
- History: 2005–present
- Publisher: Society for Socialist Studies
- Open access: Yes

Standard abbreviations
- ISO 4: Social. Stud.

Indexing
- ISSN: 1918-2821

Links
- Journal homepage

Socialist Studies/Études socialistes is a peer-reviewed academic journal published by the Society for Socialist Studies. Its articles take a critical look at and offer solutions to various forms of social, economic, and political injustice.

Socialist Studies/Études socialistes was established in 2005 and in fall 2008 it became an online, open access e-journal. The current issue and all back issues are available online.

The 2011 issue was a special double-edition entitled "Organizing for Austerity: The Neoliberal State, Regulating Labour, and Working Class Resistance," guest edited by Bryan Evans and Ian Hussey. The most recent is an issue on pacification.

In a January 2014 review of Socialist Studies, Harvard University said "...the content spans many subjects (and) much of the content will be of special interest to a Canadian scholarly audience. Libraries serving Canadian and socialist scholars should be knowledgeable about this title."
