= Marxism–Leninism–Maoism =

Communist political ideology

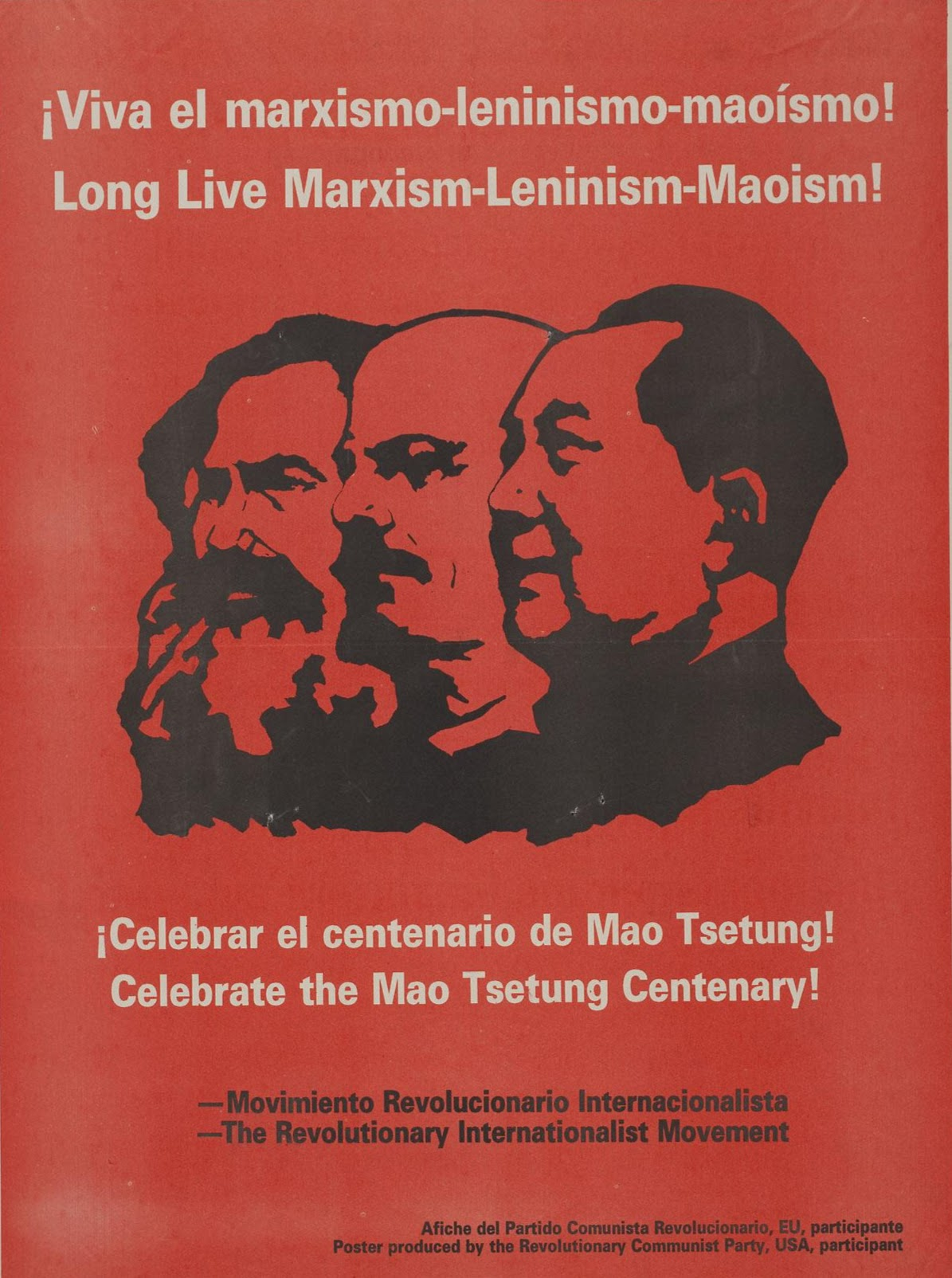
Poster produced by the Revolutionary Communist Party, USA showing Marx, Lenin, and Mao

Marxism–Leninism–Maoism (MLM) is a communist ideology, building upon Marxism-Leninism, developed by Joseph Stalin, and Maoism, developed by Mao Zedong, while MLM was first developed by Abimael Guzman, better known as Chairman Gonzalo, who was the founder and leader of the Communist Party of Peru - Shining Path. As a term, it's used by many communist groups to emphasize the significance of Maoism as a new stage in Marxist theory and practice. Adherents of Marxism–Leninism–Maoism claim it to be a unified, coherent higher stage of Marxism. The term is sometimes used interchangeably with "Maoism" and "Marxism–Leninism" by adherents, although the latter term is more associated with Stalin.

Marxism-Leninism-Maoism has been espoused by a number of insurgent groups in the global periphery, including the Unified Communist Party of Nepal (Maoist) (which entered government in 2006), the Communist Party of India (Maoist), and the Communist Party of the Philippines. In developed countries (the "imperial core"), MLM has been promoted by the Revolutionary Communist Party, USA (RCP) in the 1990s, and more recently by smaller groups such as the American Red Guards and Norway's Tjen Folket (Serve the People). In the 1990s the Revolutionary Internationalist Movement (dominated by the RCP) served as an international coalition of MLM groups.

== Origins ==
Communist groups outside of China influenced by Maoism have existed since the Sino-Soviet split of the 1960s. In particular, the Canadian Maoist theorist J. Moufawad-Paul identifies Charu Mazumdar, Joma Sison, and Ibrahim Kaypakkaya (and their associated revolutionary organizations, all of which were involved in "people's wars") as forebears of Marxism-Leninism-Maoism. However, Moufawad-Paul argues that prior to 1988 organizations that were called "Maoist" subscribed to "Mao Zedong Thought" or versions of anti-revisionist Marxism-Leninism that privileged China over the USSR, rather than "Maoism-qua-Maoism." He writes that Marxism-Leninism-Maoism (Maoism as "the third stage for revolutionary science") was first theorized by the Shining Path in 1988 and further elaborated by the Revolutionary Internationalist Movement in 1993. Moufawad-Paul argues that this is the version of Maoism now "hegemonic" among Maoists worldwide. (Note: Moufawad-Paul identifies the Maoist Third Worldism associated with the Maoist Internationalist Movement) as another current within contemporary Maoism (Continuity and Rupture, page 47 note 3).) The document "On Marxism-Leninism-Maoism," released by Shining Path's central committee in 1988, describes "Marxism-Leninism-Maoism, principally Maoism" as "the third, newest and highest stage of the ideology of the international proletariat." Similarly, RIM's statement "Long Live Marxism-Leninism-Maoism!", published in 1993, describes MLM as the movement's "guiding ideology."

Some other Maoists have expressed similar views, with Tjen Folket stating in 2019 that "Maoism was comprehensed [sic] only through the People's War in Peru and that the PCP was the only Maoist Party in the world in 1982." The anarchist author Elliott Liu similarly writes of "the 'Marxism-Leninism-Maoism' synthesis put forward by the Shining Path and the Revolutionary Internationalist Movement in the early 1990s."

== Components ==
=== New Democracy ===
The theory of New Democracy holds that the national-bourgeois in semi-feudal and semi-colonial countries has a dual character in that although it is an exploitative capitalist force, it can also but not always side with the proletariat against colonialism, imperialism and the comprador-bourgeoisie (whose existence is due to imperialism).

Much like the New Economic Policy in Russia, New Democracy is conceived of as a necessary (but temporary) stage for the long-term development of socialism, or in this case for the construction and consolidation of socialism in the first place. It holds that the national-bourgeois in the New Democratic stage must always be firmly under the command of the proletariat and they must be firmly dispensed with as soon as the national situation allows (in other words, when the contradiction between feudalism and the masses is no longer the primary contradiction of the nation, or when the bourgeois-democratic revolution is at a sufficiently advanced stage) for an outright dictatorship of the proletariat.

=== Mass line ===
Building on the theory of the vanguard party by Vladimir Lenin, the theory of the mass line outlines a strategy for the revolutionary leadership of the masses, consolidation of the dictatorship of the proletariat and strengthening of the party and for the building of socialism. The mass line can be summarized by the phrase "from the masses, to the masses".

=== Law of contradiction ===
Marxist–Leninist–Maoists uphold Mao Zedong's philosophical works, particularly his work on dialectics in On Contradiction and on epistemology in On Practice.

=== Protracted people's war ===
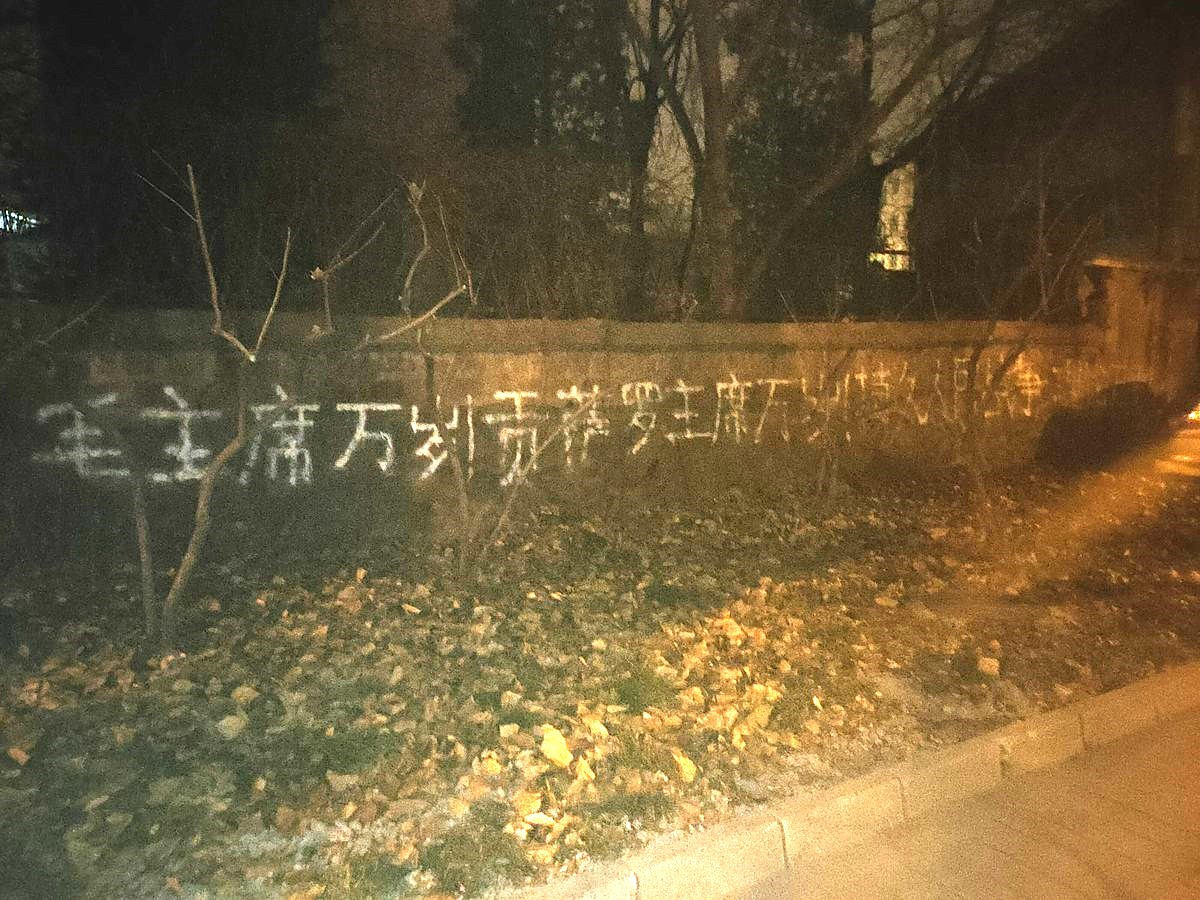
Graffiti at Tsinghua University promoting Marxism–Leninism–Maoism: it translates as "Long live Chairman Mao! Long live Chairman Gonzalo! Long live the theory of protracted people's war!"

People's war is a Maoist military strategy. A joint declaration published by a number of Marxist–Leninist–Maoist organizations (Communist Party of India (Marxist–Leninist) People's War, Communist Party of the Philippines, Communist Party of Turkey/Marxist–Leninist, and others) in 1998 stated that "the strategic line of protracted people's war...is applicable in most countries of the world, where the peasant masses are in the majority among the basic producers" but is "not applicable in industrial capitalist countries" (where power is to be seized instead through "workers' uprisings"). In contrast, Tjen Folket and others have argued that people's war is "universally applicable" and represents "the only military strategy of the Proletariat."

== Differences from Mao Zedong Thought ==
The three most notable differences between Marxism–Leninism–Maoism and Mao Zedong Thought are the following:

1. Marxism–Leninism–Maoism is considered to be a higher stage of Marxism–Leninism by its followers, much like Marxism–Leninism is considered a higher stage of Marxism. However, Mao Zedong Thought is considered to be a development of Marxism-Leninism that arose in the Chinese Revolution.
2. Marxism–Leninism–Maoism is considered to be a "qualitative leap" in ideology, which is universally applicable. Alternatively, Mao Zedong Thought is considered to be a "quantitative" development generated by the experience of the Chinese Revolution. While Mao Zedong Thought contains universal contributions, it is not considered to be a systemic ideology.
3. Marxism–Leninism–Maoism completely rejects the Three Worlds Theory of Mao Zedong Thought, considering it part of the right-wards turn in the Chinese Communist Party led by Deng Xiaoping near the end of Chairman Mao's life and a deviation from Marxist–Leninist theories of imperialism.
4. Marxism-Leninism-Maoism holds that imperialism is in a stage of retreat, and that Communist Parties must militarize themselves to participate in this. While both Marxism-Leninism and Mao Zedong Thought contain elements of this, Marxism-Leninism-Maoism sees it as being a primary task.

== International influence ==
Perhaps the most notable international influence was the Revolutionary Internationalist Movement (RIM). RIM was founded in 1984 and included such organizations as the Shining Path and the then-Communist Party of Nepal (Maoist), eventually known as the Unified Communist Party of Nepal (Maoist). Today, the RIM appears to be defunct or near defunct. The magazine associated with the RIM, A World to Win, has not published an issue since 2006, though A World to Win News Service still publishes regularly on the Internet. In addition, many of the one-time RIM organizations have become increasingly critical of each other and this has resulted in many public splits.

=== Latin America ===
Marxist-Leninist-Maoist groups in Latin America include the Communist Party of Brazil (Red Fraction), the Communist Party of Chile (Red Fraction), the Communist Party of Ecuador–Red Sun, the Red Fraction of the Communist Party of Colombia and the Committee to Reconstitute the Communist Party of Mexico.

==== Peru ====
In the 1980s and 1990s Shining Path, which claimed Marxism-Leninism-Maoism as its ideology, fought an insurgency against the Peruvian state that resulted in tens of thousands of deaths. This insurgency was largely defeated in the 1990s, although sporadic violence has continued into the present.

=== Asia ===
==== India ====
The Communist Party of India (Maoist) is a Marxist–Leninist–Maoist political party which aims to overthrow the government of India. It was founded on 21 September 2004 through the merger of the Communist Party of India (Marxist–Leninist) People's War and the Maoist Communist Centre of India. The merger was announced to the public on 14 October the same year. In the merger, a provisional central committee was constituted, with the erstwhile people's war leader Muppala Lakshmana Rao (alias Ganapathi) as the general secretary. It is currently proscribed as a terrorist organization by the Indian government.

==== Nepal ====
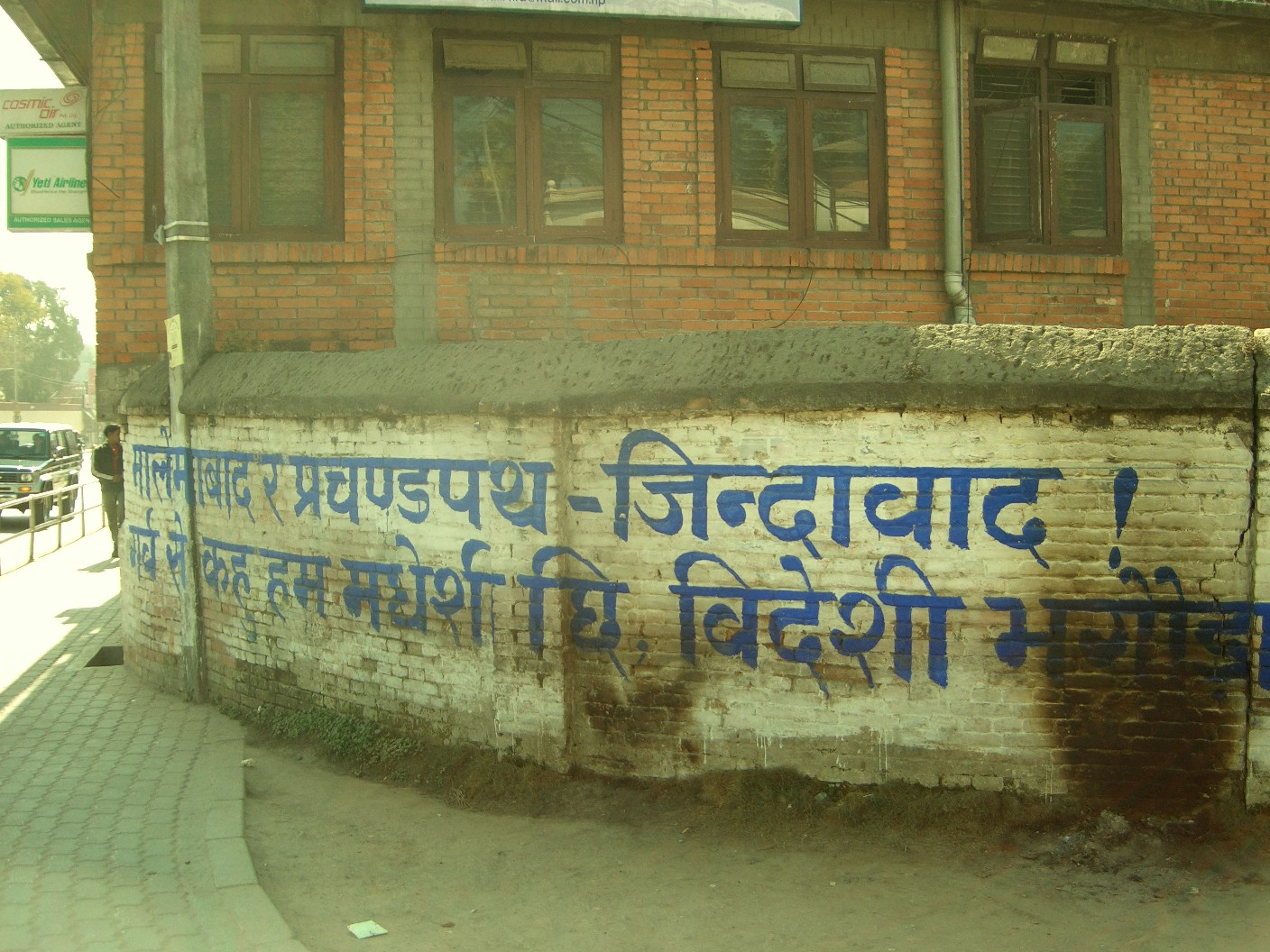
Mural in Kathmandu reading "Long Live Marxism-Leninism-Maoism and Prachanda Path"

The Unified Communist Party of Nepal (Maoist), a national communist party with a revolutionary background, is a follower of Marxism–Leninism–Maoism. However, the party has also developed its own guiding thought known as Marxism–Leninism–Maoism–Prachanda Path which was developed taking Nepal's political, sociological and geographical constraints into consideration.

The Communist Party of Nepal (Maoist) is another Marxist–Leninist–Maoist party in Nepal. It claims that the UCPN(M) is a revisionist organization and is continuing the people's war against the UCPN(M) government.

==== Philippines ====
The Communist Party of the Philippines, which has been fighting an insurgency against the Philippine state since 1968, has espoused Marxism-Leninism-Maoism. In its earlier years, party documents referred to Marxism-Leninism-Mao Zedong Thought rather than Marxism-Leninism-Maoism.

=== United States ===
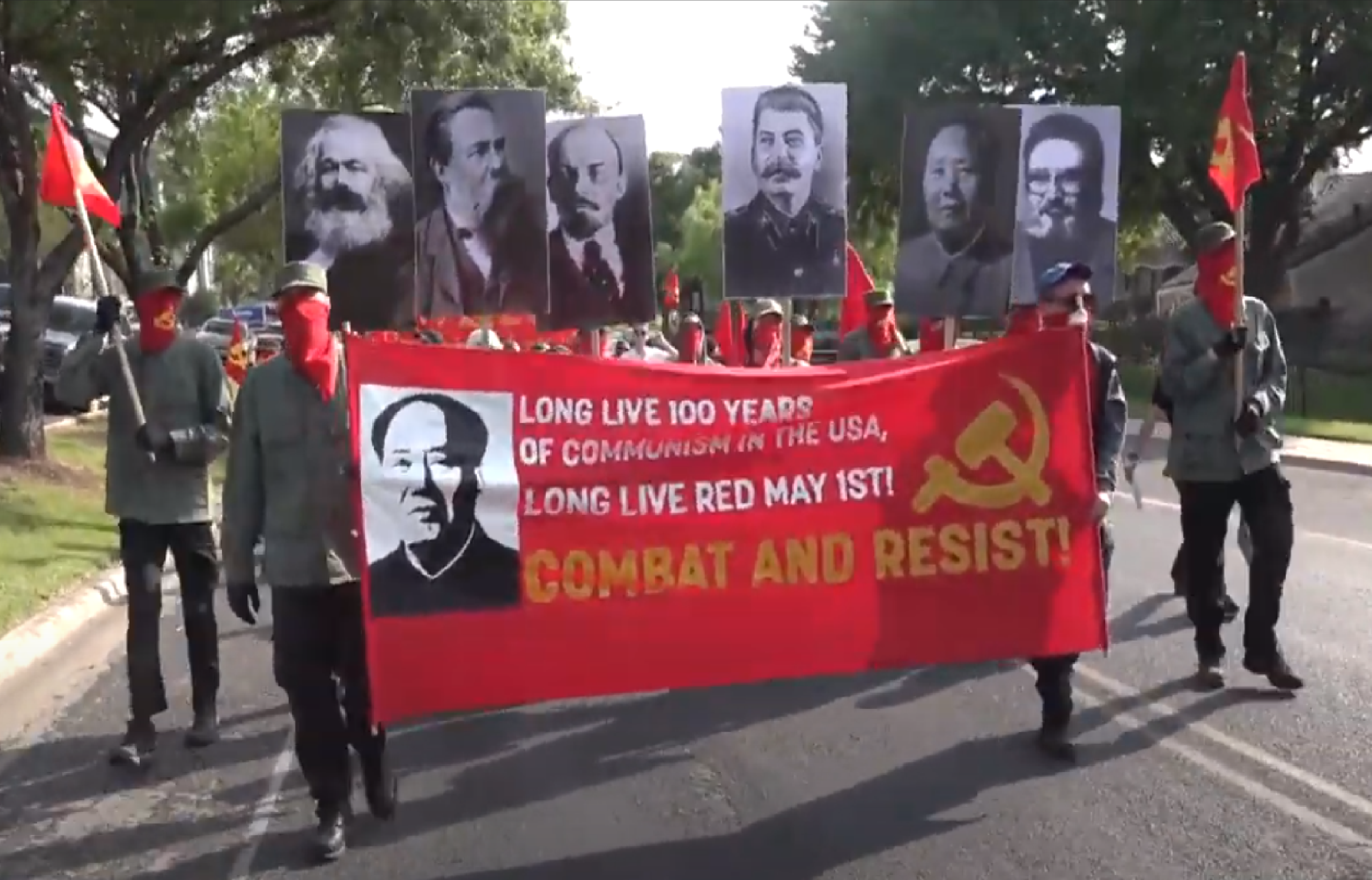
Maoists in Austin marching in 2019, carrying pictures of Marx, Engels, Lenin, Stalin, Mao, and Abimael Guzmán

The Revolutionary Communist Party, USA (RCP) was previously a Marxist–Leninist–Maoist political party in the United States. The RCP participated in the founding conference of the Revolutionary Internationalist Movement on 12 March 1984. The RCP signed the "Declaration of the Revolutionary Internationalist Movement" and supported the RIM's declaration "Long Live Marxism–Leninism–Maoism!" on 26 December 1993 which recognized "Marxism–Leninism–Maoism as the new, third and higher stage of Marxism". However, today the RCP uses the "New Synthesis of Communism" to describe its ideology, although they still call themselves Maoists. Because of this, the RCP has been accused of revisionism by several Marxist–Leninist–Maoist groups such as the Communist Party of India (Maoist) and the Revolutionary Communist Party of Canada.

Founded in 2015, the Red Guards espoused Marxism-Leninism-Maoism and had branches in several US cities.

=== Europe ===
MLM groups in Europe have included Tjen Folket in Norway and Youth Resistance in Germany.

In Greece, OAKKE claims to be an MLM party while simultaneously taking various pro-American and pro-Israel positions.
