= Marxist–Leninist Group Revolution =

Revolusjon (Revolution) ML-Gruppa Revolusjon
- Founded: 1987
- Preceded by: Marxist-Leninist League
- Newspaper: Revolusjon!
- Ideology: Communism; Marxism–Leninism; Hoxhaism; Anti-revisionism
- Political position: Far-left
- National affiliation: Communist Platform
- International affiliation: ICMLPO
- Colours: Red

Website
- www.revolusjon.no

An issue of the magazine, Revolusjon!

Marxist–Leninist Group Revolution (Norwegian: ML-gruppa Revolusjon) was a communist party in Norway, named after its journal Revolusjon! (Revolution). It was formed in 1987 by former members of Marxist-Leninist League. Marxist–Leninist Group Revolution' had an anti-revisionist stance and was oriented towards Albania. The group is an active member of the International Conference of Marxist-Leninist Parties and Organizations (Unity & Struggle).

Marxist–Leninist Group Revolution was the original publisher of the magazine Revolusjon! until the formation of Communist Platform in 2007, who since then has assumed responsibility for the journal. They were cooperating with other marxist-leninist groups, mainly ex-members of the Workers' Communist Party, on forming a new communist party. This initiative is called Communist Platform.

== See also ==
- List of anti-revisionist groups
