= New English Review =

- Discipline: Literature
- Language: English
- Edited by: Rebecca Bynum

Publication details
- History: 2006–present
- Publisher: World Encounter Institute
- Frequency: Monthly

Standard abbreviations
- ISO 4: New Engl. Rev.

Indexing
- OCLC no.: 608163485

Links
- Journal homepage

The New English Review is an online monthly magazine of cultural criticism, published from Nashville, Tennessee, since February 2006. An eponymous press is run by the same publisher.

== Profile ==
The magazine was funded by Roy Bishko, owner of Tie Rack. Editor Rebecca Bynum was a long-time collaborator with Robert Spencer, a noted far-right Islamophobe activist, before heralding NER.

== Reception ==
Sveinung Sandberg, a criminologist at the University of Oslo, notes Anders Breivik to have been inspired and motivated by anti-Islamic discourse on sites including NER. Sindre Bangstad, a social anthropologist at University of Oslo, described the site as a "counter-jihadist publication" in discussing how the spread of Islamophobia within right-wing political networks of Norway had birthed Breivik. Joel Busher, a sociologist at the Coventry University, found NER to be part of the broader counter-jihad ecosystem which lamented the "failings of Western liberalism" to resist the "cultural loss" of Europe in the wake of increasing Muslim immigration; it hosted content that was sympathetic to the English Defence League, a far-right, Islamophobic organization in the United Kingdom.

Cynthia Miller-Idriss, a sociologist at American University who specializes in far-right extremism, notes the journal to have platformed favorable reviews of Bat Ye'or's works propounding Eurabia — a far-right anti-Muslim conspiracy theory, involving globalist entities allegedly led by French and Arab powers, to Islamise and Arabise Europe. Joe Turner, a political scientist at the University of York, found Peter McLoughlin's monograph on grooming in UK, published by the press in 2016, to be intimately linked with Islamophobia and white nationalism — McLoughlin was more anxious about protecting "white Britishness" from "Islam" than individual bodies. Ella Cockbain, a criminologist at University College London, found the book to be far-right propaganda in that it accused the entire Muslim community of colluding with the groomers and took digs at multiculturalism; NER itself was described as a "conservative magazine heavily involved in the 'counter-jihad' movement".

Bynum's monograph on why Islam is not a religion, published by the press in 2011, has been noted to fuel Islamophobia. Lorenz Langer, a professor of law at University of Zurich, noted her to be among those who made a living by "churning out alarmist accounts of the threat that Islam poses to the Occident". Philip Dorling, while describing the attempts by Pauline Hanson's One Nation to have Islam unconsidered as a religion, found synonymities with Bynum, editor of the "far-right" NER.
