= Communist Party of the Philippines =

Political party in the Philippines

Communist Party of the Philippines Partido Komunista ng Pilipinas
- Chairman: Vacant
- Founder: Jose Maria Sison... and others: Monico Atienza; Rey Casipe; Leoncio Co; Manuel Collantes; Arthur Garcia; Herminihildo Garcia; Ruben Guevara; Art Pangilinan; Nilo Tayag; Fernando Tayag; Ibarra Tubianosa; Jose Luneta (in absentia)
- Founded: 26 December 1968
- Split from: Partido Komunista ng Pilipinas-1930
- Newspaper: Ang Bayan
- Armed wing: New People's Army
- Youth wing: Kabataang Makabayan
- Popular front: National Democratic Front
- Ideology: Communism; Marxism–Leninism–Maoism; National Democracy
- International affiliation: ICMLPO (formerly)
- Colours: Red
- Anthem: "Ang Internasyunal"
- Secessions: Revolutionary Workers' Party (1995); Marxist–Leninist Party of the Philippines (1998); Partido ng Manggagawang Pilipino (2002)

Party flag

Website
- cpp.ph

The Communist Party of the Philippines (CPP; Filipino: Partido Komunista ng Pilipinas) is a Marxist–Leninist–Maoist revolutionary organization and communist party in the Philippines, formed by Jose Maria Sison on 26 December 1968 following a split in the original Partido Komunista ng Pilipinas.

The CPP has been fighting a protracted people's war against the state since its establishment. Its goal is to carry out a national democratic revolution and establish a people's democracy guided by a communist vanguard party. The CPP's application of Marxism-Leninism to the particularities of the Philippines is captured in its ideology of National Democracy.

Although its ranks initially numbered around 500, the party grew quickly, supposedly due to the declaration and imposition of martial law by former president and dictator Ferdinand Marcos. By the end of Marcos' 21-year rule of the country, the number of combatants had expanded to include more than 10,000 fighters. Other sources place the peak of membership at 25,000 in the late 1980s. In 2019, Sison claimed that the number of its members and supporters is growing, despite claims by the Philippine government that the organization is close to being destroyed. The CPP claims to be the largest Marxist–Leninist–Maoist formation in the world, with the organization claiming to have 150,000 members in 2022. The organization remains an underground operation, with its primary goals being to overthrow the Philippine government through armed revolution and remove U.S. influence over the Philippines. It consists of the National Democratic Front, a coalition of other revolutionary organizations in the Philippines with aligning goals; the Kabataang Makabayan, which serves as its youth wing; and the New People's Army, which serves as its armed wing.

It has been designated as a terrorist group by the United States Department of State, together with Sison and the New People's Army, since 2002. The European Union renewed its terrorist designation on the organization in 2019, though a 2009 ruling by the EU's second highest court delisted Sison as a "person supporting terrorism" and reversed a decision by member governments to freeze assets. According to the US' Central Intelligence Agency (CIA) World Factbook, the CPP and the NPA aims to destabilize the Philippines' economy and overthrow the national government.

Philippine president and former student of Sison Rodrigo Duterte declared the group a terrorist organization in 2017, though the CPP-NPA has not yet been legally declared as a terrorist group by Philippine courts.

== History ==
=== Background (1930–1967) ===
The original Partido Komunista ng Pilipinas (PKP, later PKP-1930) was founded on 7 November 1930 and was born out of the local labour movement with its core consisting of former members of the Partido Obrero de Filipinas, an earlier Marxist party. Initially formed under the wings of the CPUSA, the PKP established the Hukbalahap in 1942 first as a guerilla group against the Japanese but later extended their goal into a rebellion against the Philippine government and formally integrated the force as their armed wing, the Army of National Liberation (Hukbong Mapagpalaya ng Bayan, HMB). By the mid-1950s, after the decisive defeat of the HMB, the PKP abandoned the armed struggle and announced its plans to partake in elections. This was made impossible by the Anti-Subversion Act of 1957 outlawing the party and its front organisations. In the face of the anti-communist campaign the party effectively went into hiding, limiting contact between members and ceasing to recruit new ones.

It was during this time that a young Jose Maria Sison organized a Marxist study group called the Student Cultural Association of the University of the Philippines (SCAUP), counting in its rank many of the future revolutionary leaders of the CPP such as Satur Ocampo. Through connections to the Communist Party of Indonesia he was exposed to the writings of Mao Zedong which left a big impression. After working for a while in the PKP-led Lapiang Manggagawa Sison was appointed to the PKP's Executive Committee in January 1963. As head of the PKP's youth wing he founded and chairmaned Kabataang Makabayan in 1964. Kabataang Makabayan would function as the primary source of new recruits for the PKP, but, aligning with Sison, they demanded the party to take a more active stance against U.S. imperialism, the Philippine government and landlords who controlled the means of rural production.

==== First Great Rectification ====
In December 1965 Sison submitted a report constituting a critical review of the PKP's entire history to be debated in Congress. This report which would later be given the title of "Rectify Errors and Rebuild the Party" (RERP) identified key problems with the PKP under the leadership of the Lava brothers (Vicente, José and Jesus) which spanned from 1942 to 1964. It criticized the party for being "city-based" and opting for "bourgeois parliamentary struggle" after World War II. Intended as a piece of criticism and self-criticism calling for a "thorough rectification campaign", RERP was shelved by party leadership and Sison was expelled from the PKP in April 1967.

=== Reestablishment (1968–1969) ===
While the PKP Central Committee declared his expulsion, Sison and his followers insisted on the opposite and on 26 December 1968 "re-established" the Communist Party of the Philippines (CPP) on the foundations of Mao Zedong Thought and on the occasion of Mao Zedong's 75th birthday. The "Congress of Reestablishment" was held in a barrio in Alaminos, Pangasinan near the home of relatives of Arthur Garcia, one of the founders of the CPP. Sison later claimed that he and Garcia were joined by nine other delegates attending the congress and two lookouts from a Manila trade union. Among the attendees of the Congress of Reestablishment were Monico Atienza, Rey Casipe, Leoncio Co, Manuel Collantes, Herminihildo Garcia, Ruben Guevara, Art Pangilinan, Nilo Tayag and Fernando Tayag. Jose Luneta who was in China on party business was elected into the Central Committee in absentia. One of the lookouts was identied by Sison as Mariano "Ka Duma" Lacsa who would go on to become a local leader in the CPP's Northern Luzon Central Committee.

In 1969, Bernabe Buscayno, one of the very few active HMB guerilla leaders left in the 1960s joined Sison, and on 29 March 1969 they established the New People's Army (NPA) as the armed wing of the CPP with the goal of overthrowing the government. The founding of a people's army trained in guerilla warfare was central to the Maoist military strategy of the protracted people's war which the CPP included in its 1968 Program for a People's Democratic Revolution as the central means to overthrow the government. Buscayno has previously broken with both the PKP and Commander Sumulong who oversaw the transformation of most of the Central Luzon HMB forces from a revolutionary army to a lucrative crime syndicate.

Later reports would situate the reestablishment of the communists in the late 1960s amid a peak in civil unrest due to escalating poverty across the country and the rising unpopularity of the neighbouring Vietnam War. Rising tensions accompanied the 1965 election and first term of President Ferdinand Marcos who funded and made use of organized crime forces, and sent troops aiding the United States and South Vietnam.

While some scholars cite the Sino-Soviet split as a central reason for the ideological split in the PKP, others such as Francisco Nemenzo, a former member of the PKP-1930, refused this explanation:

The schism was not a local expression of the international dispute between the Soviet and Chinese parties but the oﬀshoot of a generational rift between the remnants of an aborted rebellion and the new elements who were spared the trauma of defeat.

— Francisco Nemenzo, "An Irrepressible Revolution: The Decline and Resurgence of the Philippine Movement", Unpublished (1984)

=== Rise and the Dictatorship Years (1970–1985) ===
By 1970 the CPP had gained ideological hegemony among the youth by answering the increased state repression Marcos (by now in his second term) used against student protesters with increased militancy. The First Quarter Storm demonstrations against Marcos' reelection combined the efforts of students with workers and peasants and radicalized many into taking up arms and joining the CPP. Over the following years political violence escalated and many people lost their lives. Additional stress was put on Marcos' administration when they had to counter an armed insurgency in Bangsamoro led by the Moro National Liberation Front, which would spiral into the decades long Moro conflict.

On 23 September 1972 Marcos declared martial law, imposing an authoritarian one-man-rule over the Philippines. The administration was quick to arrest opposition politicians such as Senator Ninoy Aquino, shut down media reporting and close down airports. In comparison to other organizations the CPP was well prepared for a state crackdown and quickly went underground as well as spreading to the rural areas. The environment after the declaration of martial law was such that dissenters who would have joined liberal opposition groups that were now crushed under Marcos were eventually drawn into the various national democratic organizations around the CPP. It was around this time that the party developed its education courses which would remain largely unchanged up until the late 1980s. Subject matter was limited to the writings of Sison (especially his 1971 book Philippine Society and Revolution) and Mao as well as a select number of texts from Lenin, Engels and Marx.

By December 1976, the CPP had a membership of 3,000–3,500. After the arrest of seven leading members, among them Buscayno and Sison, Rodolfo Salas called an emergency Central Committee meeting in December of 1977 where he was elected chairman. Known as "Kumander Bilog" he would oversee the party's greatest growth period. The same year Horacio “Boy” Morales, vice president of the Development Academy of the Philippines and a senior economist working for Marcos since 1965, publicly defected to the underground resistance around the CPP. He became head of the NDF and remained so until his capture in 1982. Morales' defection was a sign of the growing legitimacy of the national democrats. In November the NDF called for "all anti-imperialist forces and democratic forces to overthrow the U.S.-Marcos dictatorship and work for the establishment of a coalition government based on a truly democratic system of representation". In 1981 the Philippine government estimated 5,600 active full-time NPA militans and CPP activits as well as part-time militants to be around 23,000. The assassination of Ninoy Aquino in 1983 accelerated the growth of legal opposition to the dictatorship as well as the NPA which was now estimated to consist of 24,000 guerillas and had engaged in its first urban guerilla warfare in over ten years.

=== Second Great Rectification Movement (1992–1998) ===
In the 10th plenum of the CPP, the party engaged in a "second rectification movement" that reviewed and corrected the errors that created havoc on the revolutionary movement for more than a decade since its founding in 1968.

Armando Liwanag, chairman of CPP, issued a document called "Reaffirm Our Basic Principles and Carry the Revolution Forward" that repudiated the deviations of leading party cadres in the country that resulted in the gravest setbacks and destruction to the Party and the revolutionary movement, first in one major island and subsequently on a nationwide scale.

The document states that these erroneous policies "have caused setbacks through a process of self-constriction and have inflicted unprecedentedly heavy losses in the strength of the Party and the people's army and gross reductions of mass base".

The criticism and debates that ensued between the leading party cadres resulted in the expulsion of advocates of "left and right opportunism", notably forming the so-called "rejectionists" and "reaffirmist" factions.

The rejectionists took the lines of "strategic counteroffensive", "regularization", and combining military adventurism with insurrectionism from 1980 onward that overlapped with the reaffirmists who uphold the "correct" revolutionary method of people's war.

The rectification movement was aimed to defeat the "wrong line" in a comprehensive and thoroughgoing manner and strengthen the party ideologically, politically and organizationally. Thus, the rectification movement came into force in 1992, especially after the Plenum of the Central Committee approved the rectification documents.

==== Splits and divisions ====
Not all CPP cadres abided by the "Reaffirm" document penned by Liwanag. Those who affirmed the Maoist orthodoxy were called the "Reaffirmists", or RA, while those who rejected the document were called "Rejectionists" or RJ.

In July 1993, the Komiteng Rehiyon ng Manila-Rizal (KRMR), one of the Rejectionists, declared its autonomy from the central leadership:

From this day on, we sever our ties with the illegal and absolutist circle that passes itself off as the 'Central Committee' of the CPP ... It is a principled declaration of independence ... not a secession from the entire Party organization.

— CPP Manila-Rizal

Within a few months, several of the Party's regional formations and bureaus followed suit: Central Mindanao, Western Mindanao, Negros and Central Visayas, the Visayas Commission (VisCom) staff and New People's Army units under its control, the National Peasant Secretariat, the United Front Commission and the Home Bureau and Western Europe committee.

The KRMR, VisCom and the Central and Western Mindanao regional committees later merged to form the Rebolusyonaryong Partido ng Manggagawa – Pilipinas (RPM-P) in 1998. However, the Mindanao-based cadres later left the RPM-P after a debate regarding the RPM-P's signing of a peace pact with the government then led by Joseph Estrada. Those cadres then formed the Rebolusyonaryong Partido ng Manggagawa – Mindanao (RPM-M) which joined the Fourth International in 2003.

The KRMR faction led by Filemon Lagman was earlier expelled from the RPM-P due to his "liquidationist" attitude and refusal to help in Party preparations and functions. He then formed the Bukluran ng Manggagawang Pilipino (BMP), however his closest associates, led by Sonny Melencio, bolted to form the legal political party Sosyalistang Partido ng Paggawa (SPP) in 1998.

The United Front Commission cadres formed the Partido Proletaryo Demokratiko (PPD) which then merged with Lagman's BMP and Melencio's SPP to give rise to the Bukluran ng Manggagawang Pilipino-Pinagsanib (BMP-Pinagsanib). But in 2007 another reported split occurred due to the rift between Lagman and Melencio supporters.

In 1997 several cadres from the Central Luzon committee were accused of sowing factionalism and "civilianization" of the NPA units. These cadres earlier supported the "Reaffirm" document by CPP Chairman Armando Liwanag and tried appealing for the chairman's support. This did not materialize though, and the cadres formed the Marxist–Leninist Party of the Philippines (MLPP) and organized the armed wing Rebolusyonaryong Hukbo ng Bayan (RHB). The MLPP-RHB maintains the national-democratic framework of social analysis by the CPP, although slightly modified. They also maintain the strategy of people's war, but are more akin to Vietnamese and Nepalese revolutionary strategies.

From 24 October to 2 November 2016, the CPP held its second ever congress, electing a new Central Committee and Political Bureau, as well as amending its 48 year-old constitution and setting the official Filipino lyrics of the CPP's anthem, The Internationale. In the official announcement the following year they claim that delegates representing "the Party’s close to seventy thousand members" were present.

=== Marcos Jr. administration (2022–present) ===
In 2023 peace talks were resumed between the Philippine government and the NDFP, resulting in a new mass amnesty program for former rebels. As of March 2026, over 14,000 former members of the CPP-NPA-NDF applied for amnesty.

==== Third Rectification Movement ====
On 26 December 2023, the CPP launched the Third Rectification Movement, consisting of "study campaigns" of the writings of Sison and other Marxist-Leninist-Maoist literature. The errors sought to be corrected were identified by the CPP and NPA as "military conservatism" and the resulting lack of tactical offensives against the Armed Forces of the Philippines (AFP).

==== Continuing conflicts and losses ====
In his 2025 State of the Nation Address, Bongbong Marcos claimed that there were "no more guerilla groups in the country," echoing earlier claims of success from the AFP after focused military operations, the targeting of leaders, and the constriction of lines of support, although media groups such as Vera Files point out that a high number of encounters, which saw 146 alleged NPA killed between January to November 2024, was an indication of the continued existence of the organization. With peace talks stalling, and both the AFP and NPA continuing course, conflicts still persist, although reports on losses remain widely conflicting on both sides. A truce declared by the NPA on the occasion of the holidays (Christmas and New Year's Eve) in late 2025 was not reciprocated by the Department of National Defense (DND) or the AFP. Violent clashes and arrests of suspected communists continued throughout 2026.

On 19 April 2026, the Northern Negros Front of the New People's Army (NPA NNF) engaged in an armed confrontation with the 79th Infantry Battalion of the Philippine Army resulting in ten deaths among the NPA and nine dead "civilians". Dubbed the Toboso encounter, the clash has been decried as a massacre committed by the army and renewed calls for peace negotiations.

== Ideology ==
The Communist Party of the Philippines, which promotes Marxism–Leninism–Maoism (MLM), is a revolutionary proletarian party that looks upon the legacies of past Philippine rebellions and revolutions from the perspective of the theories of Karl Marx, Friedrich Engels, Vladimir Lenin, Joseph Stalin, and Mao Zedong. It assists the progress of theory and practice in the world proletarian revolution that is guided by Marxism–Leninism–Maoism (Preamble, Constitution of the Communist Party of the Philippines, 1968).

So long as it resolutely, militantly and thoroughly carries out its ideological, political and organizational building, the Communist Party of the Philippines is certain to lead the broad masses of the Filipino people of various nationalities and ethno-linguistic communities to total victory in the national democratic revolution against US imperialism and the local reactionaries; and bring about the start of the socialist revolution.

— Armando Liwanag, Chairman, Central Committee of the Communist Party of the Philippines

=== Analysis regarding Philippine society ===
The CPP adheres to Marxism-Leninism-Maoism as its guiding ideology in analyzing and summing up the experience of the party and its creative application to the concrete conditions in the Philippines in fighting US imperialism, feudalism and bureaucrat capitalism. It considers Maoism as the highest development of Marxism-Leninism.

The CPP's analysis of Philippine society is largely based on the writings of Joma Sison, most notably Philippine Society and Revolution (1971). The CPP considers Philippine society as semicolonial and semifeudal and the character of the present revolution as national democratic of the new type (led by the proletariat). In PSR, Sison describes how the US upholds semi-colonial relation with the Philippines even after its nominal independence in 1946. According to him, US imperialism allied itself with the pre-capitalist feudal ruling class (the landowners) in order to embed semi-feudal relations of production. This in turn prevents the development of a local bourgeoisie and necessitates the "two-stage-revolution". As early as the late 1960s, Sison described the national bourgeoise as too small and powerless a faction to lead their own national democratic revolution, calling for a united front with the workers. While other economists agreed that the trade acts between the US and the Philippines were neocolonial, this analysis has also been faced with much criticism. PKP leadership for example saw the seizure of power of Marcos as the doing of a nascent national bourgeoisie.

=== Ideologies regarding armed struggle ===
The CPP regards armed struggle as a necessary component of revolution coinciding with the Party's organizational work. The NPA, as the central agent of armed struggle, serves to achieve its central task of "destroying and dismantling the rule of the enemy and taking their political power". In waging armed revolution, the NPA follows the strategic line of protracted people's war by "encircling the cities from the countryside until conditions are ripe for seizing the cities through a strategic offensive".

The NPA identifies three stages in waging armed struggle: strategic defensive, strategic stalemate, and strategic offensive. It regards itself as yet unable to conduct symmetric warfare in the urban centers and thus regards the people's war as being in a stage of strategic defensive moving to a stage of strategic stalemate. During the stage of strategic defensive, the NPA "maintains the initiative in tactical offensives against the strategic military advantage of the enemy", making use of guerrilla tactics to attack targets and defend guerrilla zones, while armed partisans perform special roles in the cities. The second stage is strategic stalemate, where fighting force is more or less equal, while the last stage is that of strategic offensive, where the NPA has developed its strength capable of assaulting military camps and cities.

==== Five-year plan ====
In 2022, the CPP leadership, in its 53rd-anniversary statement, boldly called for an advance in the revolutionary struggle and touted its forces to advance in the people's war for a new democracy. It declared its determination to strive within the next five years to make the great advance from the stage of strategic defense to the strategic stalemate, fulfilling all the requirements and without skipping any necessary phase.

It also predicted that a revolutionary government would not win the revolution by toppling the current Philippine government.

The strategic stalemate means that the revolutionary armed forces shall have achieved parity in the revolutionary war against the armed forces of the reactionary government. The strategic stalemate paves the way for the next stage in the protracted people's war, namely the strategic offensive, which pushes towards the nationwide victory in the struggle for national and social liberation.

— Armando Liwanag, Chairman, Central Committee of the Communist Party of the Philippines

Referring to Maoist military doctrine, the CPP-lead NPA adheres to the three progressive phases of protracted warfare—strategic defensive, strategic stalemate, and strategic offensive.

According to the CPP's calculations in the statement, they considered the present revolution to be at an advance sub-stage of strategic defensive.

=== Previously held positions ===
Around the mid-1980s the goal of establishing a mixed economy entered the NDF's program but was removed in 1992 as a result of the Second Great Rectification Movement.

== Legal status ==
=== Anti-Subversion Act of 1957 ===
At the time of its inception, the Government of the Philippines automatically outlawed the CPP through the Anti-Subversion Act of 1957 (Republic Act No. 1700) which had previously branded the Partido Komunista ng Pilipinas-1930 (PKP) and the Hukbalahap as an "organized conspiracy" upon its passage on 20 June 1957.

As splinter groups which had roots to the PKP, the ban extended to the CPP-NPA.

=== Repeal of the Anti-Subversion Act of 1957 ===
The Anti-Subversion Act of 1957 was repealed by President Fidel Ramos in October 1992, decriminalizing membership in the CPP and NPA.

=== 2017 Designation as a terrorist organization ===
In December 2017, President Rodrigo Duterte issued a proclamation declaring the Communist Party of the Philippines (CPP) and its armed wing, the New People's Army (NPA), as terrorist organizations. The proclamation was made on the basis of the Human Security Act and the Terrorism Financing Prevention and Suppression Act, Republic Act No.10168. However, the CPP-NPA has not yet been legally declared as a terrorist group by Philippine courts.

The United States and the European Union have designated the CPP–NPA as "foreign terrorist organizations" in 2002 and 2005, respectively.

=== Declarations of persona non grata against the CPP-NPA-NDF (2020) ===
On 11 December 2020, the Department of the Interior and Local Government said that 1,546 or 90.1% of the total 1,715 Local Government Units (LGUs) nationwide have declared the CPP-NPA-NDF persona non grata. Of these 1,546 LGUs, 64 are provinces, 110 are cities, 1,372 are municipalities, with the remaining 169 LGUs in various stages of deliberation in their respective provincial, city, and municipal councils. Some 12,474 barangays nationwide have also declared the CPP-NPA-NDF unwelcome in their territories. Six of the 17 regions in the country have reached a 100 percent declaration of persona non grata to the CPP-NPA-NDF, which are Central Luzon, Central Visayas, Zamboanga Peninsula, Mimaropa, and Cordillera Administrative Region.

The CPP-NPA responded by claiming that the declarations don't represent the will of the Filipino people, and accused the DILG and AFP of threatening the LGUs and local leaders with arrest and not giving their governments the funds they needed.

== Peace process ==
=== During the Corazon Aquino presidency ===
Following the People Power Revolution that ousted Ferdinand Marcos and allowed Corazon Aquino to assume the presidency, the Philippine government granted amnesty to political prisoners, including top CPP figures like Sison and Buscayno. In March 1986, the National Democratic Front of the Philippines announced its willingness to engage the Philippine government in a dialogue for a ceasefire between the AFP and the NPA. Preliminary talks between the Philippine government and the CPP began in August 1986, culminating in a two-month ceasefire agreement signed on 27 November 1986.

Despite preliminary talks, the Philippine government and the NDFP could not agree on the framework of the negotiations, with the NDFP asserting its belligerent status while the Philippine government demanded that the NDFP submit to the Philippine constitution. Negotiations finally broke down following the Mendiola massacre on 22 January 1987, which killed 13 protestors and injuring hundreds, with the NDFP pulling out of peace negotiations.

Attempts to resume peace talks began in 1990 when Representative Jose Yap met with Luis Jalandoni in the Netherlands to resume bilateral talks between the government and the NDFP. The Aquino presidency would however end with no substantive negotiations.

=== 2007 Arroyo amnesty proclamation ===
On 5 September 2007, President Gloria Macapagal Arroyo signed Amnesty Proclamation 1377 for members of the Communist Party of the Philippines and its armed wing, the New People's Army (NPA); other communist rebel groups; and their umbrella organization, the National Democratic Front. The amnesty will cover the crime of rebellion and all other crimes "in pursuit of political beliefs," but not including crimes against chastity, rape, torture, kidnapping for ransom, use and trafficking of illegal drugs and other crimes for personal ends and violations of international law or convention and protocols "even if alleged to have been committed in pursuit of political beliefs." The National Committee on Social Integration (NCSI) will issue a Certificate of Amnesty to qualified applicants. Implementing rules and regulations are being drafted and the decree will be submitted to the Senate of the Philippines and the House of Representatives of the Philippines for their concurrence. The proclamation becomes effective only after Congress has concurred.

=== During the Benigno Aquino III administration ===
The peace talks between the two sides have been intermittent and inconclusive since 1986, bogging down in 2012 when the government refused to free political prisoners.

=== During the Duterte administration ===
Peace talks resumed in August 2016, when Duterte released 19 rebel leaders from jail. However, President Duterte scrapped talks in February 2017, when rebels ambushed an army convoy, breaking a unilateral ceasefire that had held for five months. Both sides returned to the negotiating table on 1 April 2017.

In April 2017, peace talks between the National Democratic Front and the Philippine government brokered by Norway took place in the Netherlands, hoping to reach a political settlement in twelve months to end the conflict. This was the second time the two sides agreed on a bilateral truce since November 1986.

In 2019, the Duterte administration unilaterally declared the end of peace talks between the GRP and the NDFP, focusing instead on their counter-insurgency program Oplan Kapanatagan and what it terms as a "whole-of-nation" approach.

=== During the Marcos Jr. administration (2022–present) ===
After meeting informally for a year in the Netherlands and Norway, the Philippine government under Bongbong Marcos and the NDFP reached a consensus to resume peace talks on 23 November 2023. During the initial talks Marcos granted amnesty to former rebels of the CPP, including the Alex Boncayao Brigade, as well as the Moro Islamic Liberation Front and Moro National Liberation Front. As of March 2026, over 14,000 former members of the CPP-NPA-NDF and Alex Boncayao Brigade applied for amnesty. A speaker of the NTF-Elcac has called the high turnout "a quiet but decisive victory for peace". Meanwhile violent clashes between the government and the NPA continued, demanding victims on both sides.

In 2026, in the wake of the Toboso clash, both Defense Secretary Gilbert Teodoro and National Security Adviser Eduardo Oban have publicly voiced their rejection of any peace talks with the CPP-NPA-NDF, while still supporting the amnesty program. Oban called the peace talks a "lifeline for a dying insurgency". The NDFP meanwhile has restated amnesty for jailed consultants, the dissolution of NTF-Elcac and the addressing of the root causes of the armed conflict as conditions for the negotiations going forward. Shortly after, the Office of the Presidential Adviser on Peace, Reconciliation and Unity (OPAPRU) has restated the government's whish to finalize peace talks before the end of President Marcos Jr.'s term in 2028. As of July 2026 no continuation of the peace talks has manifested.

== International relations ==
The People's Republic of China's (PRC) relations with the CPP have supposedly "been severed since the 1980s," although Chinese underground support systems to the rebellion have surfaced from time to time. The main line of Chinese supporters have officially cut ties with the party since 2000 as the economic use of the party to the Chinese were no longer needed as the party's members have been reduced significantly.

The Soviet Union (USSR) provided political and financial assistance to the CPP from 1974 with military assistance made by 1986. Back in 1969, the USSR refused to help the CPP due to a lack of nationwide cells that can be utilized to mobilize its members. When Rodolfo Salas was apprehended in September 1986, he stated that the USSR and Vietnam agreed to provide the CPP with military assistance since the NPA needed more than 25,000 weapons in order to come to power in the Philippines.

According to Stefan Engel, the main coordinator of International Coordination of Revolutionary Parties and Organizations (ICOR), as of 2015, the CPP is willing to join ICOR.

== Publications ==
Ang Bayan (The People) is the official news publication of the Communist Party of the Philippines. The first issue was published in May 1969 and the paper has been published periodically ever since. Starting September 2000, Ang Bayan has regularly released new issues on a bimonthly basis, every 7th and 21st of the month. Since the 2000s it is being published in Filipino, with English, Waray, Hiligaynon, Bisaya, and Ilocano translations available.

The CPP also publishes Rebolusyon (Revolution), the theoretical and political journal of its Central Committee. The maiden issue of Rebolusyon came out in 1977. Its publication has been largely irregular and sporadic, with most issues coming out in the 1990s in the context of the ideological debates around the party's split between the reaffirmist and rejectionist factions. Most issues of Rebolusyon from this period are available online at the Marxists Internet Archive.

Territorial bodies of the CPP have been publishing regional papers written in local languages. Some of these regional publications include: Baringkuas (Uprising), the revolutionary newspaper of the people of Cagayan Valley; Kalatas (Message), the official newspaper of the revolutionary people of Southern Tagalog; Daba-daba (Flame), the revolutionary mass paper in Panay; Dangadang (Struggle), the revolutionary newspaper of the people of North-west Luzon; Himagsik (Revolt), the revolutionary newspaper of the people of Central Luzon; Larab (Flame), the revolutionary mass paper in Eastern Visayas; Lingkawas (Liberation), the publication of the CPP in Northeastern Mindanao; Paghimakas (Struggle), the newspaper of the CPP in Negros; Pakigbisog (Struggle), the publication of the revolutionary people of Central Visayas; and Silyab (Spark), published by the CPP-NPA in Bicol.

CPP-allied underground mass organizations (UGMOs) likewise distribute their own publications. The National Democratic Front of the Philippines (NDFP) continues to publish Liberation. It also published the now defunct Balita ng Malayang Pilipinas (BMP, News of a Free Philippines) and Taliba ng Bayan (People's Vanguard). Both the BMP and Taliba ng Bayan began publication in 1973 but have ceased operation by the late 1980s based on the extant copies available at the Philippine Radical Archives of the University of the Philippines Diliman Library. The youth UGMO Kabataang Makabayan (KM) official newspaper is Kalayaan (Freedom). The cultural UGMO Artista at Manunulat ng Sambayanan (ARMAS) literary and cultural journal is Ulos. The women's UGMO Malayang Kilusan ng Bagong Kababaihan (MAKIBAKA) newspaper is the Balita ng Malayang Pilipinas.

== See also ==
- Marxism–Leninism–Maoism
- Communism in the Philippines
- Communist armed conflicts in the Philippines
- Partido Komunista ng Pilipinas-1930
- Communist Party of India (Maoist)
- Communist Ghadar Party of India
- Shining Path
- Government of the Republic of the Philippines - National Democratic Front peace negotiations
