= Red Guards (United States) =

Maoist organizations in the United States

- Founded: 2015
- Dissolved: 2019 (as Red Guards); 2022 (complete dissolution)
- Succeeded by: Committee to Reconstitute the Communist Party USA (CR-CPUSA) (2019–2022)
- Newspaper: Incendiary News (2018–2020); Tribune of the People (2020–2022)
- Membership: 200 (estimated max)
- Ideology: Communism; Marxism–Leninism–Maoism; Gonzalo Thought; Anti-revisionism; Revolutionary socialism
- Political position: Far-left

Party flag

The Red Guards were a network of Marxist–Leninist–Maoist groups active in several American cities in the 2010s. Originating in Los Angeles and Austin, other branches operated in Kansas City, Pittsburgh, and Charlotte, as well as St. Louis and San Marcos, under the distinct titles of Red Path Saint Louis and San Marcos Revolutionary Front, respectively.

The group was named after the Red Guards that operated under Mao Zedong in the People's Republic of China during the Cultural Revolution that were composed of militant students who campaigned against the "reactionary and bourgeois" culture of China. The Red Guards opposed left-wing organizations they deemed revisionist, such as the Democratic Socialists of America (DSA), Party for Socialism and Liberation (PSL), and the Communist Party USA (CPUSA).

Since 2019, all Red Guards chapters have either been abandoned or have announced their dissolution. According to a report in The Daily Beast, several organizations speculated to be connected to former Red Guards, such as the Committee to Reconstitute the CPUSA, United Neighborhood Defense Movement, and the dormant Mike Ramos Brigade, continued activity through 2022 before shutting down They received media attention for confrontational protest tactics, conflicts with other left-wing groups, and alleged mistreatment of their members.

== History ==
=== Origins ===
The Red Guards first originated in Austin, Texas, when in 2015, communists that were previously participating in an effort to form a communist party based around Marxist–Leninist–Maoist ideology split, and instead organized into a smaller grouping, known as the Austin Red Guards, whose activities were initially limited to charity and small demonstrations in favor of the LGBTQ+ community, which were commonly done under the slogan "serve the people."

=== 2016–2018: Impact of 2016 election ===
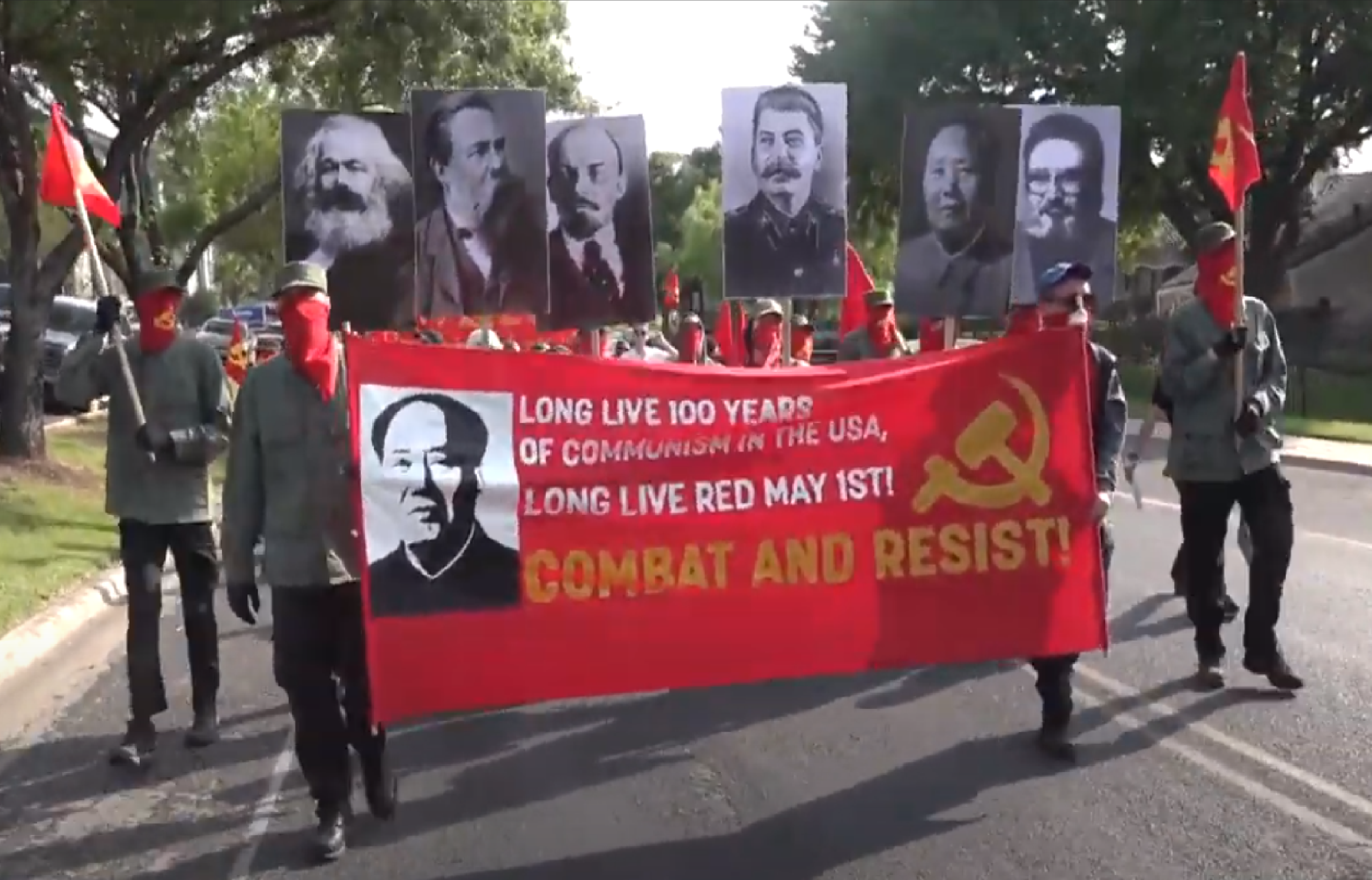
Red Guards marching in Austin, carrying images of Marx, Engels, Lenin, Stalin, Mao, and Abimael Guzmán

After the election of President Donald Trump in November 2016, the Red Guards intensified their efforts, with Red Guards Austin stating "The war is not coming, it is here and now" in their "Everywhere is a Battlefield" polemic. At an Austin protest that month, Red Guards Austin leader Jared Roark (alias Dallas) was tackled by police following an altercation with a Trump supporter. Roark was arrested, charged with resisting arrest, and ultimately found not guilty. In a 2023 article published in The Daily Beast, former Red Guards members described how the incident galvanized the groups efforts. It is believed that Roark consolidated national leadership of Red Guard chapters around 2016, due in part to the successful reputation of this event.

On September 21, 2017, a joint statement from Kansas City Revolutionary Collective (later known as Red Guards Kansas City), Red Guards Los Angeles, Tampa Maoist Collective, Queen City Maoist Collective (later known as Red Guards Charlotte), Red Guards Austin, and Revolutionary Association of Houston was released that heavily criticized and publicly severed all ties with the Saint Louis Revolutionary Collective due to alleged "horrendous security culture" and "weaponized identity politics" within Saint Louis Revolutionary Collective's leadership.

On March 8, 2018, the Kansas City Revolutionary Collective reconstituted itself as Red Guards Kansas City due to "a higher level of unity that has been achieved after almost two years of patient struggle with other Red Guards collectives, specifically Red Guards Austin" in regards primarily to questions of "the universality of protracted people's war, party militarization, and concentric construction of the three instruments for revolution".

=== 2019–2022: Post-dissolution activity ===
On December 17, 2018, Red Guards Austin announced its dissolution after further controversy, with Red Guards Los Angeles following suit on May 17, 2019. In the subsequent months, most remaining Red Guards chapters ceased any public activity and announced their dissolution. According to former members, some Red Guards went underground rather than dissolving, and later formed the Committee to Reconstitute the Communist Party of the United States of America (CR-CPUSA).

Related organizations experienced further decline when leader Jared Roark began a prison sentence for firearm charges in 2021. In spring 2022, CR-CPUSA members convened in Texas and resolved to dissolve the organization for good.

== Activity ==
=== Anti-electoral protests ===
In 2015, the Red Guards went on an anti-electoral campaign, pushing for a boycott of the 2016 election, with the slogan, "Don't vote, revolt!" Red Guards Austin published an online statement in September 2018 calling for the boycott of the 2018 midterm elections. After the group's purported 2019 dissolution, members of affiliated groups reportedly smashed egg shells filled with paint on local congressional candidate Heidi Sloan.

=== Anti-gentrification activity ===
Red Guards Los Angeles members staged demonstrations against gentrification through a number of related organizations such as Defend Boyle Heights, Serve the People, Ovarian Psycos, and the Boyle Heights Alliance Against Artwashing and Displacement (BHAAAD).

Defend Our Hoodz, an organization believed to be affiliated with Red Guards Austin, protested many perceived gentrification projects throughout the city. In a 2020 Twitter statement, Defend Our Hoodz disputed Heidi Sloan's characterization of their organization as a part of Red Guards Austin.

=== Anti-police demonstrations ===
On July 18, 2016, Red Guards Austin staged a show of solidarity with the Black Lives Matter movement. The Red Guards would later heavily critique the group's mode of operation as well as its leadership, declaring the movement to be "forefronted by pig apologists".

=== Cadre School ===
In 2016, the organization began offering a month-long program known as "Cadre School" with both physical and political training.

== Ideology ==
The Red Guards released an extensive description of their political philosophy in a position paper published online in 2016, titled "Condemned to Win!" In the article, it is explained that the theoretical structures of the collectives are based on the ideology of Marxism–Leninism–Maoism, with Maoism being principal. The Red Guards place a specific reverence for Abimael Guzmán, also known as "Chairman Gonzalo", who led the Shining Path revolutionary organization and waged a protracted guerilla and terrorist campaign in Peru.

They have criticized other leftist groups including the Democratic Socialists of America, Party for Socialism and Liberation, and the Workers World Party.

== Structure ==
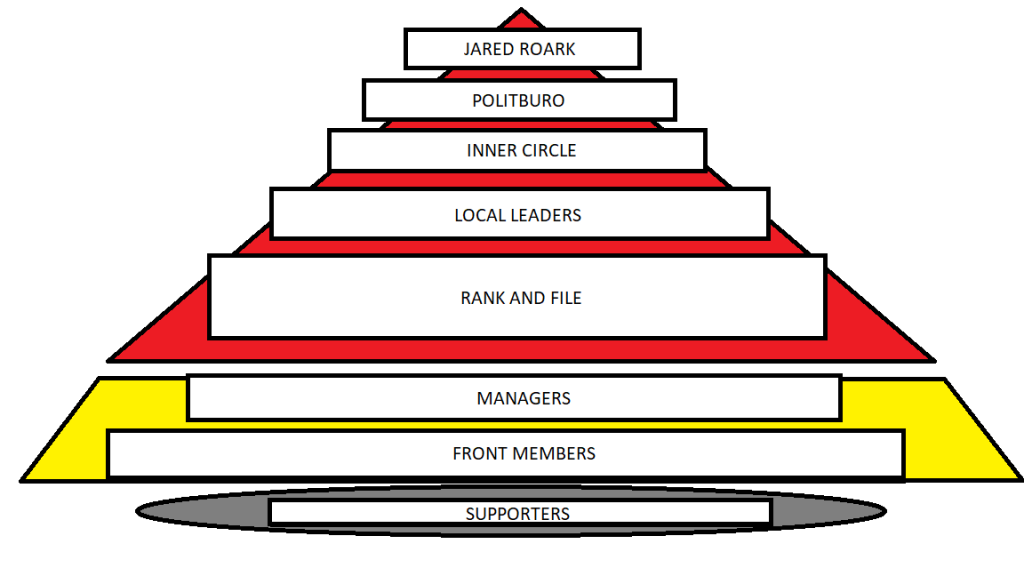
Hierarchy of the RG/CR-CPUSA. Red = internal organizers; Yellow = public organizers; Gray = semi-affiliated or unorganized supporters

The Red Guards and its subsequent organization, the CR-CPUSA, operated on a centralist structure layered by various levels of membership from public front supporters to the secretive central organization.

The national formation was led by Jared Roark, the head of the Red Guards' branch in Austin. Roark initially assumed this position in 2016, after persuading other chapters to follow his ideological thesis Condemned to Win. A select number of associates (most of whom were based in Austin) were leaders of the Politburo. This close-knit cadre of trusted personnel was further backed up with an "inner circle" chosen from the leadership of other local chapters who were deemed loyal enough to follow the Politburo's direction. The Politburo used lower "front" organizations to disseminate propaganda, rally unaffiliated activists to actions or protests, force recruitment through hostile takeovers of other progressive groups, or fanatically attempt to co-opt those groups in order to win over more unaffiliated "supporters".

== Reception ==
The Red Guards were generally negatively received by most of the American political left.

The Red Guards have been formally condemned by the Party for Socialism and Liberation (PSL). Following an alleged assault by the Red Guards in Austin, the PSL released a statement equating the Red Guard's provocations to tactics used by the FBI as part of COINTELPRO, which targeted left-wing dissidents in the 1960s and 1970s for suppression through the use of agent provocateurs.

Cosmonaut Magazine published an editorial by Konstantin Sverdlov condemning the group following a 2019 incident where members of the Red Guards Kansas City disrupted an event hosted by the local branch of the DSA, allegedly assaulted several members, and gave a public statement condemning the group as "social fascists". Sverdlov describes the group as being dogmatic and violent, routinely disrupting organizing activities, and being "fellow travelers of fascism".

The Red Guards (along with other international Maoist groups) were criticized for glorifying Shining Path in a 2019 report by the Peruvian NGO Waynakuna Perú, which was covered in the Peruvian media.

== Allegations of abuse ==
Since the initial collapse of Red Guards proper in 2019, various statements from former members have circulated online, revealing the internal culture of the organization and the behavior of its leaders. They describe the structure of the Red Guards as extremely bureaucratic, controlling, and even "cultish", with discipline revolving around leaders' subjective interpretations of members' conduct.

Dissenting members that performed unsatisfactory to this discipline would often be subject to physical and verbal assault, forced sleep deprivation, stalking and isolation, and death threats.
