= List of communist parties =

Nations with communist parties in power Party is ruling in a communist state Party is part of ruling coalition Party is part of main opposition

There are a number of communist parties active in various countries across the world and a number that used to be active. They differ not only in method, but also in strict ideology and interpretation, although they are generally within the tradition of Marxism–Leninism.

The formation of communist parties in various countries was first initiated by the Russian Bolsheviks within the Communist International. Since then, communist parties have governed numerous countries, whether as ruling parties in one-party states like the Chinese Communist Party or the Communist Party of the Soviet Union, or as ruling parties in multi-party systems, including majority and minority governments as well as leading or being part of several coalitions.

Many other communist parties did not govern any country, but did govern a state or region within a country. Others have also been represented in national, state, or regional parliaments. Some communist parties and schools of thought reject parliamentarism, instead advocating insurrection or social revolution as well as workers' councils.

== Officially ruling in communist states ==
In the following countries, communist parties either lead the ruling coalition or hold monopoly on state power as defined by their respective country's constitutions.

| Country | Logo | Name | Abbr. | Leader | Founded | Ideology | Legislature | Notes |
|---|---|---|---|---|---|---|---|---|
| China | | Communist Party of China 中国共产党 | CPC 中共 | General Secretary Xi Jinping | 1 July 1921 | Marxism–Leninism | NPC: 2,103 / 2,980 | |
| Cuba | | Communist Party of Cuba; Partido Comunista de Cuba | PCC | First Secretary Miguel Díaz-Canel | 3 October 1965 | Marxism–Leninism | National Assembly: 442 / 470 | Leads the Committees for the Defense of the Revolution. |
| Laos | | Lao People's Revolutionary Party ພັກປະຊາຊົນປະຕິວັດລາວ | LPRP ພປປລ | General Secretary Thongloun Sisoulith | 22 May 1955 | Marxism–Leninism; Kaysone Phomvihane Thought | National Assembly: 158 / 164 | Leads the Lao Front for National Development. |
| North Korea | | Workers' Party of Korea 조선로동당 | WPK 로동당 | General Secretary Kim Jong Un | 24 June 1948 | Kimilsungism–Kimjongilism; Juche; Pyŏngjin | SPA: 687 / 687 | |
| Vietnam | | Communist Party of Vietnam; Đảng Cộng sản Việt Nam | CPV; ĐCSVN | General Secretary Tô Lâm | 3 February 1930 | Marxism–Leninism; Ho Chi Minh Thought | National Assembly: 485 / 499 | Leads the Vietnamese Fatherland Front. |

== Ruling or part of ruling coalition in multi-party states ==
| Country | Logo | Name | Abbr. | Leader | Founded | Ideology | Legislature | Notes |
|---|---|---|---|---|---|---|---|---|
| Belarus | | Communist Party of Belarus; Камуністычная партыя Беларусі | CPB; КПБ | Sergei Syrankov | 2 November 1996 | Marxism–Leninism; Soviet patriotism Belarusian–Russian unionism Pro-Lukashenko | Lower House: 7 / 110 Upper House: 1 / 64 | Supports the government of president Alexander Lukashenko |
| Brazil | | Communist Party of Brazil; Partido Comunista do Brasil | PCdoB | Luciana Santos | 25 March 1922 | Marxism–Leninism | Lower House: 11 / 513 | Member of the ruling federation, Brazil of Hope |
| Palestine | | Popular Front for the Liberation of Palestine الجبهة الشعبية لتحرير فلسطين | PFLP | Ahmad Sa'adat | 11 December 1967 | Palestinian nationalism Marxism–Leninism; Revolutionary socialism One-state solution Anti-Zionism; Arab nationalism | Legislative Council: 3 / 132 | Member of the Palestine Liberation Organization |
| Palestine | | Democratic Front for the Liberation of Palestine الجبهة الديمقراطية لتحرير فلسطين | DFLP | Nayef Hawatmeh | 22 February 1969 | Marxism–Leninism; Maoism; Palestinian nationalism Left-wing nationalism Anti-Zionism | Legislative Council: 1 / 132 | Member of the Palestine Liberation Organization |
| Palestine | | Palestinian People's Party حزب الشعب الفلسطيني | PPP | Bassam Al-Salhi | February 1982 | Marxism; Palestinian nationalism Left-wing nationalism | Legislative Council: 1 / 132 | Member of the Palestine Liberation Organization |
| South Africa | | South African Communist Party | SACP | Solly Afrika Mapaila | 12 February 1921 | Marxism–Leninism; Left-wing nationalism | National Assembly: 0 / 400 | Participates in the ruling Tripartite Alliance |
| Spain | | Communist Party of Spain; Partido Comunista de España | PCE | Enrique Santiago | 14 November 1921 | Marxism–Leninism; Republicanism; Internationalism; Federalism | Lower House: 5 / 350 | Member of United Left, which participates in the PSOE–Sumar coalition government |
| Sri Lanka | | Janatha Vimukthi Peramuna ජනතා විමුක්ති පෙරමුණ | JVP ජවිපෙ | Anura Kumara Dissanayake | 14 May 1965 | Marxism–Leninism; Progressivism | Parliament: 159 / 225 | Main constituent of the ruling National People's Power |
| Uruguay | | Communist Party of Uruguay; Partido Comunista del Uruguay | PCU | Óscar Andrade | 21 September 1920 | Marxism–Leninism; Internationalism | Lower House: 5 / 99 Senate: 2 / 30 | Member of the Broad Front |
| Venezuela | | Revolutionary Movement Tupamaro; Movimiento Revolucionario Tupamaro | MRT | Williams Benavides | 1992 | Marxism-Leninism; Guevarism; Foco theory Left-wing nationalism Revolutionary socialism | National Assembly: 7 / 277 | Participates in the ruling Great Patriotic Pole |
| Venezuela | | Venezuelan Popular Unity; Unidad Popular Venezolana | UPV | Lina Ron | 6 February 2004 | Bolivarianism; Socialism; Marxism | National Assembly: 2 / 277 | Participates in the ruling Great Patriotic Pole |

== Main opposition or part of main opposition coalition ==
| Country | Logo | Name | Abbr. | Leader | Founded | Ideology | Legislature | Notes |
|---|---|---|---|---|---|---|---|---|
| Argentina | | Communist Party of Argentina; Partido Comunista de la Argentina | PCA | Jorge Kreyness | 6 January 1918 | Marxism–Leninism | | Member of the Fuerza Patria |
| Argentina | | Communist Party of Argentina (Extraordinary Congress); Partido Comunista (Congreso Extraordinario) | PCCE | Pablo Pereyra | 2 December 1996 | Marxism–Leninism; Kirchnerism | | Member of the Fuerza Patria |
| Argentina | | Revolutionary Communist Party; Partido Comunista Revolucionario | PCR | Jacinto Roldán | 6 January 1968 | Revolutionary Peronism; Marxism–Leninism–Maoism; Anti-revisionism | | Member of the Fuerza Patria |
| Chile | | Communist Party of Chile; Partido Comunista de Chile | PCCh | Lautaro Carmona | 4 June 1912 | Marxism–Leninism; Left-wing populism | Lower House: 12 / 155 Senate: 3 / 50 | Member of the non-ruling Unidad por Chile coalition |
| Cyprus | | Progressive Party of Working People; Ανορθωτικό Κόμμα Εργαζόμενου Λαού | AKEL; ΑΚΕΛ | Stefanos Stefanou | 15 August 1926 | Marxism–Leninism; Cypriot nationalism Federalism; Soft Euroscepticism | House of Representatives: 15 / 56 | |
| France | | French Communist Party; Parti communiste français | PCF | Fabien Roussel | 30 December 1920 | Communism; Soft Euroscepticism | National Assembly: 8 / 577 Senate: 18 / 348 | Member of the non-ruling New Popular Front 195 / 577 |
| India | | Communist Party of India (Marxist) | CPI(M) | M. A. Baby | 31 October – 7 November 1964 | Marxism–Leninism | Rajya Sabha: 3 / 245 Lok Sabha: 4 / 543 | Member of non-organisational bloc Indian National Developmental Inclusive Alliance |
| India | | Communist Party of India | CPI | D. Raja | 26 December 1925 | Marxism | Rajya Sabha: 2 / 245 Lok Sabha: 2 / 543 | Member of non-organisational bloc Indian National Developmental Inclusive Alliance |
| India | | Communist Party of India (Marxist–Leninist) Liberation | CPIML-L | Dipankar Bhattacharya | 28 July 1974 | Marxism; Marxism–Leninism | Lok Sabha: 2 / 543 | Member of non-organisational bloc Indian National Developmental Inclusive Alliance |
| India | | Revolutionary Socialist Party | RSP | Manoj Bhattacharya | 19 March 1940 | Marxism; Marxism–Leninism | Lok Sabha: 1 / 543 | Member of non-organisational bloc Indian National Developmental Inclusive Alliance |
| India | | Peasants and Workers Party of India | PWP | Jayant Patil | 3-5 August 1947-13 June 1947 | Marxism; Marxism–Leninism | | Member of non-organisational bloc Indian National Developmental Inclusive Alliance |
| Moldova | | Party of Communists of the Republic of Moldova; Partidul Comuniștilor din Republica Moldova | PCRM | Vladimir Voronin | 22 October 1993 | Marxism–Leninism; Moldovenism; Social conservatism Soviet patriotism Russophilia | Parliament: 8 / 101 | |
| Nepal | | Communist Party of Nepal (Unified Marxist–Leninist) नेपाल कम्युनिष्ट पार्टी (एकीकृत मार्क्सवादी-लेनिनवादी) | CPN (UML) नेकपा (एमाले) | KP Sharma Oli | 6 January 1991 | Marxism–Leninism; People's Multiparty Democracy | Pratinidhi Sabha: 25 / 275 Rastriya Sabha: 11 / 59 | |
| Nepal | | Nepali Communist Party नेपाली कम्युनिष्ट पार्टी | NCP नेकपा | Pushpa Kamal Dahal | 5 November 2025 | Marxism–Leninism | Pratinidhi Sabha: 17 / 275 Rastriya Sabha: 18 / 59 | |
| Russia | | Communist Party of the Russian Federation; Коммунистическая Партия Российской Федерации | CPRF; КПРФ | Gennady Zyuganov | 14 February 1993 | Marxism–Leninism; Left-wing nationalism Social conservatism Soviet patriotism Neo-Stalinism | State Duma: 37 / 450 Federation Council: 2 / 178 | Supports some stances of the government of president Vladimir Putin, especially during the Russian invasion of Ukraine |
| South Africa | | Economic Freedom Fighters | EFF | Julius Malema | 26 July 2013 | Marxism–Leninism; Fanonism; Sankarism; Pan-Africanism; Black nationalism Anti-Zionism; Left-wing populism | National Assembly: 39 / 400 NCOP: 10 / 90 | Member of the non-ruling Progressive Caucus |
| Transnistria | | Transnistrian Communist Party; Приднестровская коммунистическая партия | PKP; ПКП | Nadezhda Bondarenko | 20 April 2003 | Marxism-Leninism | | No members in parliament but only opposition party with the second position in votes |

== Ruling in quasi-states ==
| Government | Logo | Name | Abbr. | Leader | Founded | Ideology | Notes |
|---|---|---|---|---|---|---|---|
| People's Government of Kokang | | Myanmar National Truth and Justice Party မြန်မာနိုင်ငံ အမှန်တရားနှင့် တရားမျှတသော အမျိုးသား ပါတီ 缅甸民族正义党 | MNTJP | Peng Daxun | 29 June 2013 | Xi Jinping Thought; Kokang nationalism Ethno-nationalism | Political wing of the Myanmar National Democratic Alliance Army (MNDAA) |
| Wa State | | United Wa State Party ဝပြည် သွေးစည်း ညီညွတ်ရေး ပါတီ 佤邦联合党 | UWSP | Bao Youxiang | 3 November 1989 | Marxism–Leninism; Maoism; Wa nationalism Ethno-nationalism; Militarism | Political wing of the United Wa State Army (UWSA) |

== Formerly ruling ==
=== One-party system ===
| Country | Logo | Name | Abbr. | Leaders | Founded | Dissolved | Ideology | Notes |
|---|---|---|---|---|---|---|---|---|
| Afghanistan (1978–1992) | | People's Democratic Party of Afghanistan حزب دموکراتيک خلق افغانستان د افغانستان د خلق دموکراټیک ګوند | PDPA | Nur Muhammad Taraki (first); Mohammad Najibullah (last) | 1 January 1965 | 16 April 1992 | Marxism–Leninism; Left-wing nationalism Secularism; Revolutionary socialism | Abandoned Marxism–Leninism in 1987, deposed in 1992 |
| Albania (1946–1992) | | Party of Labour of Albania; Partia e Punës e Shqipërisë | PPSh | Enver Hoxha (first); Ramiz Alia (last) | 8 November 1941 | 13 June 1991 | Marxism–Leninism; Hoxhaism; Stalinism; Anti-revisionism | Abandoned Marxism–Leninism for social democracy in 1991; now known as the PSSh |
| Angola (1975–1992) | | People's Movement for the Liberation of Angola; Movimento Popular de Libertação de Angola | MPLA | Agostinho Neto (first); João Lourenço (current) | 10 December 1956 | | Marxism–Leninism | Abandoned Marxism–Leninism for social democracy |
| Azerbaijan People's Government (1945–1946) | | Azerbaijani Democratic Party; Azərbaycan Demokrat Firqəsi فرقه دموکرات آذربایجان< | ADP; ADF فدآ< | Ja'far Pishevari | 3 September 1945 | 1960 | Marxism–Leninism; Azerbaijani nationalism Left-wing nationalism Pan-Turkism | Ceased to exist in exile |
| Benin (1975–1990) | | People's Revolutionary Party of Benin; Parti de la révolution populaire du Bénin | PRPB | Mathieu Kérékou | 30 November 1975 | 30 April 1990 | Marxism–Leninism; Scientific socialism Beninese nationalism | Abandoned Marxism–Leninism for social democracy; now known as the UFP |
| Bulgaria (1946–1990) | | Bulgarian Communist Party; Българска комунистическа партия | PRPB; БКП | Dimitar Blagoev (first); Aleksandar Lilov (last) | 27 May 1919 | 3 April 1990 | Marxism–Leninism; Stalinism (until 1956) | Abandoned Marxism–Leninism for social democracy; now known as the BSP |
| Cambodia (1975–1979) | | Communist Party of Kampuchea បក្សកុម្មុយនីស្តកម្ពុជា | CPK ប.ក.ក | Tou Samouth (first); Pol Pot (last) | 30 September 1960 | 6 December 1981 | Maoism; Khmer nationalism Agrarianism; Anti-intellectualism; Autarky | Succeeded by the exiled, non-ruling and now-defunct Party of Democratic Kampuchea |
| Cambodia (1979–1992) | | Kampuchean People's Revolutionary Party គណបក្សប្រជាជនបដិវត្តន៍កម្ពុជា | KPRP | Pen Sovan (first); Heng Samrin (last) | 28 June 1951; 5 January 1979 | 17 October 1991 | Marxism–Leninism | Abandoned Marxism–Leninism for centrism; now known as the CPP |
| Comoros (1975-1978) | | Democratic Rally of the Comorian People; Rassemblement Démocratique des Peuples Comoriens | RDPC | Ahmed Abdallah (first); Mouigni Baraka (current) | 1968 | | Marxism-Leninism; Maoism; Islamic socialism | Abandoned Marxism-Leninism for social democracy |
| Congo (1979–1992) | | Congolese Party of Labour; Parti congolais du travail | PCT | Marien Ngouabi (first); Denis Sassou Nguesso (current) | 29 December 1969 | | Marxism–Leninism; Scientific socialism | Abandoned Marxism–Leninism for social democracy |
| Czechoslovakia (1948–1990) | | Communist Party of Czechoslovakia; Komunistická strana Československa | KSČ | Václav Šturc (first); Ladislav Adamec (last) | 16 May 1921 | 3 November 1992 | Marxism–Leninism; Socialism with a human face (1968); Husakism (1969–1989) | Split into the non-ruling KSČM and the social democratic SDL |
| Ethiopia (1979–1984) | | Commission for Organizing the Party of the Working People of Ethiopia የኢትዮጵያ የሥራ ሕዝብ ፓርቲ የማደራጀት ኮሚሽን | COPWE | Mengistu Haile Mariam | 17 December 1979 | 12 September 1984 | Marxism–Leninism | Succeeded by the WPE |
| Ethiopia (1984–1991) | | Workers' Party of Ethiopia የኢትዮጵያ ሠራተኞች ፓርቲ | WPE የሠፓ | Mengistu Haile Mariam | 12 September 1984 | 21 May 1991 | Marxism–Leninism | Deposed in 1991 |
| East Germany (1949–1989) | | Socialist Unity Party of Germany; Sozialistische Einheitspartei Deutschlands | SED | Wilhelm Pieck & Otto Grotewohl (first); Egon Krenz (last) | 21 April 1946 | 16 December 1989 | Marxism–Leninism; Socialist patriotism Stalinism (until 1956) | Became the PDS, part of The Left |
| Greece (1944, 1947–1949) | | Communist Party of Greece; Κομμουνιστικό Κόμμα Ελλάδας | KKE; ΚΚΕ | Avraam Benaroya (first); Dimitris Koutsoumpas (current) | 17 November 1918 | | Marxism–Leninism; Internationalism; Anti-capitalism; Euroscepticism | Overthrown during the Greek Civil War |
| Grenada (1979–1983) | | New JEWEL Movement | NJM | Maurice Bishop | 11 March 1973 | 29 October 1983 | Marxism–Leninism; State atheism Revolutionary socialism Republicanism; Left-wing populism Pan-Africanism; Anti-colonialism | Lost power and ceased to exist after an internal party split, a military coup, and the American invasion. Succeeded by the MBPM |
| Hungary (1919) | | Hungarian Communist Party; Magyar Kommunista Párt | MKP | Béla Kun (first); Mátyás Rákosi (last) | 24 November 1918 | 22 July 1948 | Marxism–Leninism; State atheism Revolutionary socialism Republicanism; Stalinism | Deposed in August 1919 |
| Hungary (1948–1989) | | Hungarian Communist Party; Magyar Kommunista Párt | MKP | Béla Kun (first); Mátyás Rákosi (last) | 24 November 1918 | 22 July 1948 | Marxism–Leninism; State atheism Revolutionary socialism Republicanism; Stalinism | Merged with the MSZDP into the MDP |
| Hungary (1948–1989) | | Hungarian Working People's Party; Magyar Dolgozók Pártja | MDP | Mátyás Rákosi (first); János Kádár (last) | 22 July 1948 | 31 October 1956 | Marxism–Leninism; Stalinism | Reorganized into the MSZMP during the 1956 Hungarian Revolution |
| Hungary (1948–1989) | | Hungarian Socialist Workers' Party; Magyar Szocialista Munkáspárt | MSZMP | János Kádár (first); Rezső Nyers (last) | 31 October 1956 | 7 October 1989 | Marxism–Leninism; Kádárism | Abandoned Marxism–Leninism for social democracy; now known as the MSZP |
| Madagascar (1975–1992) | | Vanguard of the Malagasy Revolution; Antokin'ny Revolisiona Malagasy | AREMA | Didier Ratsiraka (first); Annick Zoary Ratsiraka (current) | 19 March 1976 | | Marxism–Leninism | Abandoned Marxism–Leninism for social democracy |
| Mongolia (1921–1992) | | Mongolian People's Revolutionary Party; Монгол Ардын Хувьсгалт Нам | MAKhN; МАХН | Damdin Sükhbaatar (first); Luvsannamsrain Oyun-Erdene (current) | 25 June 1920 | | Marxism–Leninism; Stalinism (1928–1956) | Abandoned Marxism–Leninism for social democracy |
| Mozambique (1975–1990) | | FRELIMO Party; Partido FRELIMO | FRELIMO | Eduardo Mondlane (first); Filipe Nyusi (current) | 25 June 1962 | | Marxism–Leninism; Left-wing nationalism | Abandoned Marxism–Leninism for democratic socialism |
| Poland (1944–1989) | | Polish Workers' Party; Polska Partia Robotnicza | PPR | Władysław Gomułka | 5 January 1942 | 16 December 1948 | Marxism–Leninism; Stalinism | Merged with the PPS to form the PZPR |
| Poland (1944–1989) | | Polish United Workers' Party; Polska Zjednoczona Partia Robotnicza | PZPR | Bolesław Bierut (first); Mieczysław Rakowski (last) | 16 December 1948 | 30 January 1990 | Marxism–Leninism; Left-wing nationalism Stalinism (until 1956) | Abandoned Marxism–Leninism for social democracy; later known as the Democratic Left Alliance |
| Romania (1945–1989) | | Romanian Communist Party; Partidul Comunist Român | PCR | Gheorghe Cristescu (first); Nicolae Ceaușescu (last) | 8 May 1921 | 22 December 1989 | Marxism–Leninism; Anti-revisionism; Left-wing nationalism Socialist patriotism Neo-Stalinism (post-1971); National Communism (post-1971) | Dissolved after the Romanian Revolution |
| Somalia (1976–1991) | | Somali Revolutionary Socialist Party; Xisbiga Hantiwadaagga Kacaanka Soomaaliyeed | XHKS | Siad Barre | 26 June 1976 | 26 January 1992 | Marxism–Leninism; Islamic socialism Pan-Somalism; Scientific socialism Somali nationalism Militarism | Deposed in 1991 |
| Soviet Union (1922–1991) | | Communist Party of the Soviet Union; Коммунистическая партия Советского Союза | CPSU; КПСС | Vladimir Lenin (first); Mikhail Gorbachev (last) | May 1917 | 6 November 1991 | Leninism (1922–1927); Stalinism (1927–1953); Marxism–Leninism (1953–1991); Soviet patriotism | Banned in 1991, de facto succeeded by UCP-CPSU and CPRF |
| South Yemen (1967–1990) | | National Liberation Front الجبهة القومية للتحرير | NLF | Qahtan Muhammad al-Shaabi | 1963 | 13 October 1978 | Marxism–Leninism; Arab nationalism | Reorganized itself into the YSP |
| South Yemen (1967–1990) | | Yemeni Socialist Party الحزب الاشتراكي اليمني | YSP | Abdul Fattah Ismail (first); Abdulraham Al-Saqqaf (current) | 13 October 1978 | | Marxism–Leninism; Arab nationalism | Abandoned Marxism–Leninism for social democracy |
| Tannu Tuva (1921–1944) | | Tuvan People's Revolutionary Party; Тьва arat-хuviskaalçь nam Тувинская народно-революционная партия | TPRP; ТAХN; ТНРП | Namachyn (first); Salchak Toka (last) | 21 October 1921 | 11 October 1944 | Marxism–Leninism; Stalinism | Became the Tuvan Regional Committee of the VKP(b), later CPSU |
| Yugoslavia (1945–1990) | | League of Communists of Yugoslavia; Савез комуниста Југославије; Savez komunista Jugoslavije | SKJ; СКJ | Josip Broz Tito (1939–1980); Milan Pančevski (last) | 20 April 1919 | 22 January 1990 | Marxism–Leninism; Titoism | Splintered into its many constituent parties in 1990 |

=== Parliamentary majority or minority government ===
| Country | Logo | Name | Abbr. | Leaders | Founded | Dissolved | Ideology | Notes |
|---|---|---|---|---|---|---|---|---|
| Austria (1945–1949) | | Communist Party of Austria; Kommunistische Partei Österreichs | KPÖ | Ruth Fischer, Franz Koritschoner, & Lucien Laurat (first); Günther Hopfgartner (current) | 3 November 1918 | | Marxism–Leninism; Socialism | Participated in the provisional government coalition after World War II and for four years after the 1945 election |
| Chad (1993) | | Chadian Action for Unity and Socialism; Action Tchadienne pour l'unité et le socialisme | ACTUS | Fidèle Moungar | 1 May 1981 | | Marxism–Leninism; Stalinism | The party's leader was chosen as Prime Minister in April 1993. |
| Cyprus (2008–2013) | | Progressive Party of Working People; Ανορθωτικό Κόμμα Εργαζόμενου Λαού | AKEL; ΑΚΕΛ | Ploutis Servas (first); Stefanos Stefanou (current) | 15 August 1926 | | Marxism–Leninism; Cypriot nationalism Federalism; Soft euroscepticism | Won the 2008 election and ruled until 2013 |
| Guyana (1992–2015, 2020–2024) | | People's Progressive Party/Civic | PPP/С | Cheddi Jagan & Janet Jagan (first); Bharrat Jagdeo (current) | 1 January 1950 | | Social democracy Left-wing populism Left-wing nationalism Historically:Marxism–Leninism | Abandoned Marxism–Leninism officially in 2024. |
| India (1996–1998) | | Communist Party of India | CPI | Sachchidanand Vishnu Ghate (first); D. Raja (current) | 26 December 1925 | | Marxism–Leninism; Left-wing nationalism | Member of the United Front and its coalition government |
| India (1996–1998) | | Communist Party of India (Marxist) | CPI(M) | Puchalapalli Sundarayya (first); M. A. Baby (current) | 7 November 1964 | | Marxism–Leninism; Left-wing nationalism | Member of the United Front and its coalition government |
| Moldova (2001–2009) | | Party of Communists of the Republic of Moldova; Partidul Comuniștilor din Republica Moldova | PCRM | Vladimir Voronin | 22 October 1993 | | Marxism–Leninism; Moldovenism; Social conservatism Soviet patriotism Russophilia | Deposed after the 2009 protests |
| Nepal (1994–1995, 2008–2013, 2015–2017, 2018–2021, 2022–2025) | | Communist Party of Nepal (Unified Marxist–Leninist) नेपाल कम्युनिष्ट पार्टी (एकीकृत मार्क्सवादी-लेनिनवादी) | CPN (UML) नेकपा (एमाले) | Madan Bhandari (first); K. P. Sharma Oli (current) | 6 January 1991; 8 March 2021 | 17 May 2018 | Marxism–Leninism; People's Multiparty Democracy | Merged with the CPN (MC) to form the NCP in 2018, refounded in 2021 |
| Nepal (1994–1995, 2008–2013, 2015–2017, 2018–2021, 2022–2025) | | Nepal Communist Party नेपाल कम्युनिष्ट पार्टी | NCP नेकपा | K. P. Sharma Oli; Pushpa Kamal Dahal | 17 May 2018 | 8 March 2021 | Marxism–Leninism; People's Multiparty Democracy; Prachanda Path; Democratic centralism Secularism; Federalism | Dissolved as a result of internal conflicts in 2021 |
| San Marino (1945–1957, 1978–1990) | | Sammarinese Communist Party; Partito Comunista Sammarinese | PCS | Ermenegildo Gasperoni | 21 January 1921 | | Eurocommunism; Marxism-Leninism (until 1970s) | Deposed by coup d'etat orchestrated by Italy and America in Fatti di Rovereta |

=== Coalition partner or supporter ===
- Bulgaria (2005–2009, 2013–2014, 2021–2022) – Communist Party of Bulgaria, in coalition government as member of the Coalition for Bulgaria
- Belgium (1946–1947) – Communist Party of Belgium, in the Van Acker I Government
- Finland (1944–1948, 1966–1970, 1970–1971, 1975–1976 and 1977–1982) – Finnish People's Democratic League, in coalition governments with numerous other parties
- France (1981–1989; 1997–2002) – French Communist Party as a part of the Union de la gauche and of the Gauche plurielle
- India (2004–2008) – Communist Party of India (Marxist) and Communist Party of India, in the coalition government of the United Progressive Alliance
- Iran (1946) – Tudeh Party of Iran, in the coalition government of Ahmad Qavam
- Iraq (1973–1980) – Iraqi Communist Party, in coalition government as member of the National Progressive Front
- Italy (1998–2001, 2006–2008) – Party of Italian Communists in the D'Alema I Cabinet, D'Alema II Cabinet, Amato II Cabinet with The Olive Tree; Communist Refoundation Party and Party of Italian Communists in the coalition government of The Union
- Mali (2005–2014) – Malian Party of Labour, participated in the Alliance for Democracy in Mali
- Norway (1945) – Communist Party of Norway in coalition government as member of Gerhardsen's First Cabinet led by the Labour Party
- Peru (2011–2016) – Peruvian Communist Party, in coalition governments as member of Peru Wins
- Portugal (2015–2019) – Portuguese Communist Party in support of the XXI Constitutional Government of Portugal led by the Socialist Party
- San Marino (1945–1957, 1978–1992) – Sammarinese Communist Party, in coalition government with Sammarinese Socialist Party
- Sri Lanka (1970–1975, 1994–2000, 2004–2015 and 2020–2022) – Communist Party of Sri Lanka and Lanka Sama Samaja Party, in coalition governments with numerous other parties
- Syria (1972–2024) – Syrian Communist Party, later split into Syrian Communist Party (Unified) and Syrian Communist Party (Bakdash), in coalition governments as members of the National Progressive Front
- Uruguay (2005–2020) – Communist Party of Uruguay, in coalition governments as member of the Broad Front

== Modern non-ruling ==
| Country/Territory | Logo | Name | Abbr. | Leader | Founded | Ideology | Legislature | Notes |
|---|---|---|---|---|---|---|---|---|
| Abkhazia | | Communist Party of Abkhazia; Аԥсны Акомунисттә Апартиа | CPA; ААА | Lev Shamba | March 1921 | Marxism–Leninism | People's Assembly: 0 / 35 | |
| Afghanistan | | Afghanistan Liberation Organization سازمان رهایی افغانستان | ALO | | 1973 | Marxism–Leninism–Maoism; Anti-revisionism | Banned | Participant in the ongoing anti-Taliban insurgency in Afghanistan |
| Afghanistan | | Communist (Maoist) Party of Afghanistan حزب كمونيست (مائوئيست) افغانستان | CMPM | | 2004 | Marxism–Leninism–Maoism | Banned | Participant in the ongoing anti-Taliban insurgency in Afghanistan |
| Afghanistan | | Marxist–Leninist Organization of Afghanistan | MLOA | | 1973 | Marxism-Leninism; Maoism; Anti-revisionism | Banned | |
| Albania | | Communist Party of Albania; Partia Komuniste e Shqipërisë | PKSh | Qemal Cicollari | 1991 | Marxism–Leninism; Hoxhaism; Stalinism; Anti-revisionism | Kuvendi: 0 / 140 | |
| Albania | | Communist Party of Albania 8 November; Partia Komuniste e Shqipërisë 8 Nëntori | PKSh 8 Nëntori | Preng Çuni | 2003 | Marxism-Leninism | Kuvendi: 0 / 140 | |
| Albania | | Reorganised Party of Labour of Albania Partia e Punes e Shqiperise e Riorganizuar | PPSR | Marko Dajti | July 4, 2007 | Marxism–Leninism; Hoxhaism | Kuvendi: 0 / 140 | |
| Algeria | | Workers' Party حزب العمالⴰⴽⴰⴱⴰⵔ ⵢⵅⴻⴷⴷⴰⵎⴻⵏ | WP | Louisa Hanoune | 1990 | Trotskyism | People's National Assembly: 0 / 407 Council: 0 / 174 People's Provincial Assemblies: 28 / 2,004 Municipalities: 17 / 1,540 People's Municipal Assembly: 510 / 24,876 | |
| Algeria | | Algerian Party for Democracy and Socialism الحزب الجزائري للديمقراطية والاشتراكية | PADS | Abdelhamid Benzine | 1993 | Marxism–Leninism | People's National Assembly: 0 / 407 Council: 0 / 174 People's Provincial Assemblies: 0 / 2,004 Municipalities: 0 / 1,540 People's Municipal Assembly: 0 / 24,876 | |
| Algeria | | Socialist Workers Party حزب العمال الاشتراكي; Parti socialiste des travailleurs | SWP | | 1989 | Marxism; Trotskyism; Socialism | People's National Assembly: 0 / 407 Council: 0 / 174 People's Provincial Assemblies: 0 / 2,004 Municipalities: 0 / 1,540 People's Municipal Assembly: 0 / 24,876 | |
| Angola | | Party of the Angolan Communist Community; Partido da Comunidade Comunista Angolana | PCCA | Baptista André José Simão | 1994 | Marxism–Leninism | National Assembly: 0 / 220 | |
| Argentina | | Workers' Left Front; Frente de Izquierda y de los Trabajadores | WLF | | 14 April 2011 | Trotskyism | Chamber of Deputies: 5 / 257 Senate: 0 / 72 | |
| Argentina | | Socialist Workers' Party; Partido de los Trabajadores Socialistas | SWP | | 1988 | Trotskyism | Chamber of Deputies: 4 / 257 Senate: 0 / 72 | |
| Argentina | | Workers' Party; Partido Obrero | WP | | 1964 | Trotskyism | Chamber of Deputies: 1 / 257 Senate: 0 / 72 | |
| Argentina | | Communist Party of Argentina (Extraordinary Congress); Partido Comunista (Congreso Extraordinario) | CPA (EC) | | 2 December 1996 | | Chamber of Deputies: 0 / 257 Senate: 0 / 72 | |
| Argentina | | Liberation Party; Partido de la Liberación | PL | Sergio Ortiz | 5 April 1965 | | Chamber of Deputies: 0 / 257 Senate: 0 / 72 | |
| Argentina | | Revolutionary Communist Party; Partido Comunista Revolucionario | PCR | | 6 January 1968 | Maoism | Chamber of Deputies: 0 / 257 Senate: 0 / 72 | |
| Argentina | | Socialist Left; Izquierda Socialista | SL | | 21 September 2006 | Trotskyism | Chamber of Deputies: 0 / 257 Senate: 0 / 72 | |
| Argentina | | United Socialist Workers' Party | USWP; PSTU | | 2011 | Trotskyism | Chamber of Deputies: 0 / 257 Senate: 0 / 72 | |
| Argentina | | Workers' Socialist Movement; Movimiento Socialista de los Trabajadores | WSM | | 1992 | Trotskyism | Chamber of Deputies: 0 / 257 Senate: 0 / 72 | |
| Armenia | | Armenian Communist Party; Հայաստանի կոմունիստական կուսակցություն | HKK; ՀԿԿ | Tachat Sargsyan | 29 July 1991 | Marxism–Leninism; Pro-Russia; Euroscepticism; Soviet patriotism | National Assembly: 0 / 107 | |
| Armenia | | Progressive United Communist Party of Armenia; Հայաստանի Առաջադիմական Միացյալ Կոմունիստական Կուսակցություն | HAMK; ՀԱՄԿ | Vazgen Safaryan | 28 January 1998 | Marxism–Leninism; Soviet patriotism | National Assembly: 0 / 107 | |
| Armenia | | United Communist Party of Armenia; Հայաստանի Միավորված Կոմունիստական Կուսակցության | HMKK; ՀՄԿԿ | | 7 July 2003 | Marxism–Leninism; Euroscepticism | National Assembly: 0 / 107 | |
| Australia | | Communist Party of Australia (1971) | CPA | Vinicio Molina | 1971 | Marxism–Leninism | House of Representatives: 0 / 151 Senate: 0 / 76 | |
| Australia | | Communist Party of Australia (Marxist–Leninist) | CPA (ML) | | 15 March 1964 | Marxism–Leninism; Anti-revisionism; Left-wing nationalism | House of Representatives: 0 / 151 Senate: 0 / 76 | |
| Australia | | Socialist Equality Party | SEP | | 2010 | Marxism; Trotskyism | House of Representatives: 0 / 151 Senate: 0 / 76 | |
| Australia | | Association for a Revolutionary Australia | ARA | | 2025 | Marxism–Leninism Left-wing nationalism | | |
| Austria | | Communist Party of Austria; Kommunistische Partei Österreichs | KPO | Günther Hopfgartner | 3 November 1918 | Communism; Socialism | National Council: 0 / 183 Federal Council: 0 / 62 | |
| Austria | | Party of Labour of Austria; Partei der Arbeit Österreichs | PdA | Otto Bruckner | 12 October 2013 | Marxism–Leninism; Hard Euroscepticism | National Council: 0 / 183 Federal Council: 0 / 62 | |
| Azerbaijan | | Azerbaijan Communist Party (1993); Azərbaycan Kommunist Partiyası | AzKP | Haji Hajiyev | 1993 | Marxism–Leninism | National Assembly: 0 / 125 | |
| Azerbaijan | | New Generation Communist Party of Azerbaijan; Azərbaycan Yeni Nəsil Kommunist Partiyası | AYNKP | Niyazi Rajabov | 2008 | Marxism–Leninism | National Assembly: 0 / 125 | |
| Azerbaijan | | United Communist Party of Azerbaijan; Azərbaycan Birləşmiş Kommunist Partiyası | AVKP | Sayad Sayadov | 1993 | Marxism–Leninism | National Assembly: 0 / 125 | |
| Bahrain | | National Liberation Front جبهة التحرير الوطني | NLF | | 15 February 1955 | Marxism–Leninism; Republicanism | Council of Representatives: 0 / 40 Shura Council: 0 / 40 | Led the 1965 March Intifada |
| Bahrain | | Progressive Democratic Tribune جمعية المنبر الديمقراطي التقدمي | PDT | Hassan Madan | 14 September 2001 | Market socialism Arab nationalism Anti-globalization | Council of Representatives: 0 / 40 Shura Council: 0 / 40 | |
| Bangladesh | | Biplobi Communist Party বিপ্লবী কমিউনিস্ট পার্টি | BCP | Gazi Kamrul | 1998 | Maoism | Jatiya Sangsad: 0 / 350 | Parliament dissolved since 6 August 2024 |
| Bangladesh | | Communist Party of Bangladesh বাংলাদেশের কমিউনিস্ট পার্টি | CPB | Abdullah Kafee Ratan | 1971 | Marxism–Leninism | Jatiya Sangsad: 0 / 350 | Parliament dissolved since 6 August 2024 |
| Bangladesh | | Communist Party of Bangladesh (Marxist–Leninist) (Dutta) বাংলাদেশের সাম্যবাদী দল (মার্কসবাদী-লেনিনবাদী) | BSD-ML | Ajoy Dutta | | Marxism–Leninism–Maoism | Jatiya Sangsad: 0 / 350 | Parliament dissolved since 6 August 2024 |
| Bangladesh | | Communist Party of Bangladesh (Marxist–Leninist) (Umar) বাংলাদেশের সাম্যবাদী দল (মার্কসবাদী-লেনিনবাদী) | BSD-ML | Badruddin Umar | | Marxism–Leninism–Maoism | Jatiya Sangsad: 0 / 350 | Parliament dissolved since 6 August 2024 |
| Bangladesh | | Maoist Bolshevik Reorganisation Movement of the Purba Banglar Sarbahara Party পূর্ববাংলার সর্বহারা পার্টি – মাওবাদী বলশেভিক পুনর্গঠন আন্দোলন | PBSP (MBRM) | | 2001 | Marxism–Leninism–Maoism; Anti-revisionism; Revolutionary socialism | Jatiya Sangsad: 0 / 350 | Parliament dissolved since 6 August 2024 |
| Bangladesh | | Proletarian Party of East Bengal পূর্ব বাংলার সর্বহারা পার্টি | PBSP | Siraj Sikder | 3 June 1971 | Marxism–Leninism–Maoism; Revolutionary socialism | Jatiya Sangsad: 0 / 350 | Parliament dissolved since 6 August 2024 |
| Bangladesh | | Revolutionary Communist League of Bangladesh বাংলাদেশের বিপ্লবী কমিউনিস্ট লীগ | RCLB | Iqbal Kabir Jahid | April 2013 | Marxism–Leninism | Jatiya Sangsad: 0 / 350 | Parliament dissolved since 6 August 2024 |
| Bangladesh | | Revolutionary Workers Party of Bangladesh বাংলাদেশের বিপ্লবী ওয়ার্কার্স পার্টি | RWPB | Saiful Haque | 14 June 2004 | Marxism–Leninism | Jatiya Sangsad: 0 / 350 | Parliament dissolved since 6 August 2024 |
| Bangladesh | | Socialist Party of Bangladesh বাংলাদেশের সমাজতান্ত্রিক দল | BASAD | Bazlur Rashid Firoz | 7 November 1980 | Marxism–Leninism–Maoism; Anti-revisionism | Jatiya Sangsad: 0 / 350 | Parliament dissolved since 6 August 2024 |
| Bangladesh | | Socialist Party of Bangladesh (Marxist) বাংলাদেশের সমাজতান্ত্রিক দল (মার্কসবাদী) | SPBM | Masud Rana | 7 April 2013 | Marxism–Leninism; Anti-revisionism; Shibdas Ghosh Thought | Jatiya Sangsad: 0 / 350 | Parliament dissolved since 6 August 2024 |
| Bangladesh | | Workers Party of Bangladesh বাংলাদেশের ওয়ার্কার্স পার্টি | WPB | Fazle Hossain Badsha | 1980 | Marxism–Leninism | Jatiya Sangsad: 0 / 350 | Parliament dissolved since 6 August 2024 |
| Bangladesh | | Workers Peasants Socialist Party শ্রমিক কৃষক সমাজবাদী দল | SKSD | Nirmal Sen | 1969 | Marxism–Leninism | Jatiya Sangsad: 0 / 350 | Parliament dissolved since 6 August 2024 |
| Belgium | | Communist Party of Belgium; Communistische Partij van België; Parti Communiste de Belgique | PCB | Arne Baillière | 1989 | Marxism–Leninism; Hard Euroscepticism | Chamber of Representatives: 0 / 150 Senate: 0 / 60 | |
| Benin | | Communist Party of Benin; Parti Communiste du Bénin | PCB | Philippe Noudjenoume | 1977 | Marxism–Leninism; Hoxhaism; Stalinism; Anti-revisionism | National Assembly: 0 / 83 | |
| Benin | | Marxist–Leninist Communist Party of Benin; Parti communiste marxiste-léniniste du Bénin | PCMLB | Magloire Yansunnu | 1999 | Marxism–Leninism; Hoxhaism; Anti-revisionism | National Assembly: 0 / 83 | |
| Bhutan | | Communist Party of Bhutan (Marxist–Leninist–Maoist) | CPB (MLM) | Comrade Umesh (nom de guerre) | 22 April 2003 | Marxism–Leninism–Maoism; New Democratic Revolution; Republicanism | Banned | Engaged in guerrilla warfare against the government of Bhutan, with the goal of starting a people's war |
| Bolivia | | Communist Party of Bolivia; Partido Comunista de Bolivia | PCB | Ignacio Mendoza | 1950 | Marxism–Leninism | Deputies: 0 / 183 Senate: 0 / 36 | |
| Bolivia | | Communist Party of Bolivia (Marxist–Leninist–Maoist); Partido Comunista de Bolivia (Marxista-Leninista-Maoísta) | PCB-MLM | Luis Alberto Echazú | 1983 | Marxism–Leninism–Maoism | Deputies: 0 / 183 Senate: 0 / 36 | |
| Bolivia | | People's Revolutionary Front (Marxist−Leninist−Maoist); Frente Revolucionario del Pueblo (Marxista–Leninista–Maoísta) | FRP-MLM | | | Marxism–Leninism–Maoism | Deputies: 0 / 183 Senate: 0 / 36 | |
| Bolivia | | Revolutionary Workers' Party Partido Obrero Revolucionario | POR | | December 1935 | Trotskyism | Deputies: 0 / 183 Senate: 0 / 36 | |
| Bosnia and Herzegovina | | Communist Party; Komunistička partija / Комунистичка партија | KP / КП | Muhamed Imamović | 21 February 2012 | Democratic socialism Yugo-nostalgia | House of Representatives: 0 / 42 House of Peoples: 0 / 15 | |
| Bosnia and Herzegovina | | Workers' Communist Party of Bosnia and Herzegovina; Radničko-komunistička partija Bosne i Hercegovine / Радничко-комунистичка партија Босне и Херцеговине | RKP-Bih / РКП-БиХ | Goran Marković | 2000 | Luxemburgism; Workers' self-management Anti-nationalism; Yugoslavism | House of Representatives: 0 / 42 House of Peoples: 0 / 15 | |
| Botswana | | Marx, Engels, Lenin, Stalin Movement | MELS | Mosalage Ditshoto | 1994 | Marxism–Leninism; Maoism; Anti-revisionism; Pan-Africanism | Parliament: 0 / 63 | |
| Brazil | | Brazilian Communist Party; Partido Comunista Brasileiro | PCB | Edmilson Costa | 25 March 1922 | Marxism–Leninism | Chamber of Deputies: 0 / 513 Federal Senate: 0 / 81 | |
| Brazil | | Revolutionary Communist Party; Partido Comunista Revolucionário | PCR | | May 1966 | Marxism–Leninism; Stalinism; Guevarism; Hoxhaism; Anti-revisionism; Foco theory | Chamber of Deputies: 0 / 513 Federal Senate: 0 / 81 | Not registered in Brazil's Superior Electoral Court |
| Brazil | | United Socialist Workers' Party; Partido Socialista dos Trabalhadores Unificado | PSTU | Zé Maria | 5 June 1994 | Trotskyism; Morenism | Chamber of Deputies: 0 / 513 Federal Senate: 0 / 81 | |
| Brazil | | Workers' Cause Party; Partido da Causa Operária | PCO | Rui Costa Pimenta | 7 December 1995 | Marxism; Trotskyism; Social libertarianism | Chamber of Deputies: 0 / 513 Federal Senate: 0 / 81 | |
| Bulgaria | | Bulgarian Communist Party; Българска комунистическа партия | BKP | Zonka Zlatkova Spasov | 1990 | Marxism–Leninism; Stalinism; Anti-revisionism | National Assembly: 0 / 240 | |
| Bulgaria | | Bulgarian Workers' Party Българска работническа партия | BRP | Ivan Vodenicharski | 2000 | Marxism–Leninism Stalinism | National Assembly: 0 / 240 | |
| Bulgaria | | Communist Party of Bulgaria; Комунистическа Партия на България | CPB | Aleksandar Paunov | 1996 | Marxism–Leninism | National Assembly: 0 / 240 | |
| Bulgaria | | Party of the Bulgarian Communists; Партия на Българските комунисти | PBK | Collective leadership | 15 July 2006 | Marxism–Leninism | National Assembly: 0 / 240 | |
| Bulgaria | | Union of Communists in Bulgaria; Съюз на Комунистите в България | SKB | Pavel Ivanov | 1995 | Marxism | National Assembly: 0 / 240 | |
| Burkina Faso | | Party for Democracy and Socialism/Metba; Parti pour la démocratie et le socialisme/Metba | PDS/ Metba | Hama Arba Diallo | 31 March 2012 | Socialism | National Assembly: 1 / 127 | |
| Burkina Faso | | Voltaic Revolutionary Communist Party; Parti communiste révolutionnaire voltaïque | PCRV | | 1 October 1978 | Marxism–Leninism; Hoxhaism | National Assembly: 0 / 127 | |
| Canada | | Communist Party of Canada Parti communiste du Canada; Provincial affiliated parties: Communist Party – Alberta; Communist Party of Quebec; Communist Party of Ontario; Communist Party of British Columbia; Communist Party of Manitoba | CPC; PCC | Drew Garvie | 28 May 1921 | Marxism–Leninism | House of Commons: 0 / 338 Senate: 0 / 105 | |
| Canada | | Communist Party of Canada (Marxist–Leninist); Parti communiste du Canada (marxiste–léniniste) | CPC (ML); PCC (ML) | Anna Di Carlo | 31 March 1970 | Marxism–Leninism; Anti-revisionism; Maoism (1970–1977); Hoxhaism (1977–1990) | House of Commons: 0 / 338 Senate: 0 / 105 | |
| China | | Revolutionary Communist Party of China 中国革命共产党 | RCPC | | September 1948 | Marxism; Trotskyism | Legislative Council: 0 / 183 | Active in Hong Kong. Participant in the 1970s Hong Kong student protests. |
| China | | Maoist Communist Party of China 中国毛泽东主义共产党 | MCPC | Ma Houzhi | 28 November 2008 | Marxism–Leninism–Maoism; Anti-revisionism | Banned | |
| Colombia | | Colombian Communist Party – Maoist; Partido Comunista de Colombia – Maoista | PCC-M | | 7 August 2001 | Marxism–Leninism–Maoism | | |
| Colombia | | Communist Party of Colombia (Marxist–Leninist); Partido Comunista de Colombia (Marxista-Leninista) | PCdeC (M-L) | | 1965 | Marxism–Leninism; Hoxhaism; Stalinism; Anti-revisionism | | |
| Colombia | | Revolutionary Communist Group; Grupo Comunista Revolucionario | GCR | | 1982 | Marxism-Leninism; Maoism; Anti-revisionism | | |
| Colombia | | Revolutionary Independent Labour Movement; Movimiento Obrero Independiente y Revolucionario | MOIR | Gustavo Triana | 1970 | Maoism; Marxism-Leninism; New Democracy; Francisco Mosquera Thought | | |
| Costa Rica | | People's Vanguard Party; Partido Vanguardia Popular | PVP | Humberto Vargas Carbonell | 16 June 1931 | Marxism–Leninism | Legislative Assembly: 0 / 57 | Banned from 1949 to 1975 |
| Croatia | | Socialist Labour Party of Croatia; Socijalistička radnička partija Hrvatske | SRP | Kristofor Stokić | 25 October 1997 | Titoism; Democratic socialism | Sabor: 0 / 151 | |
| Cyprus | | Progressive Party of Working People; Ανορθωτικό Κόμμα Εργαζόμενου Λαού; Emekçi Halkın İlerici Partisi | AKEL; ΑΚΕΛ | Stefanos Stefanou | 15 August 1926 | Marxism–Leninism; Cypriot nationalism Federalism; Soft euroscepticism | House of Representatives 15 / 56 | Won the 2008 election and ruled until 2013 |
| Czech Republic | | Communist Party of Bohemia and Moravia; Komunistická strana Čech a Moravy | KSČM | Kateřina Konečná | 31 March 1990 | Marxism; Euroscepticism; Socialism | Chamber of Deputies: 0 / 200 Senate: 0 / 81 | Czech successor to the Communist Party of Czechoslovakia. Served as confidence and supply to the second government of Andrej Babiš in 2018. |
| Denmark | | Communist Party; Kommunistisk Parti | KP | Lotte Rørtoft-Madsen | 2006 | Marxism–Leninism; Anti-revisionism; Factions: Hoxhaism | Folketing: 0 / 179 | |
| Denmark | | Communist Party in Denmark; Kommunistisk Parti i Danmark | KPiD | Rikke G.F. Carlsson | 1990 | Marxism–Leninism | Folketing: 0 / 179 | |
| Denmark | | Communist Party of Denmark; Danmarks Kommunistiske Parti | DKP | Henrik Stamer Hedin | 9 November 1919 | Marxism–Leninism | Folketing: 0 / 179 | |
| Denmark | | Workers' Communist Party; Arbejderpartiet Kommunisterne | APK | Dorte Grenaa | April 2000 | Marxism–Leninism; Hoxhaism; Anti-revisionism | Folketing: 0 / 179 | |
| Dominican Republic | | Communist Party of Labour; Partido Comunista del Trabajo | PCT | Manuel Salazar | 1980 | Marxism–Leninism; Hoxhaism; Anti-revisionism | Chamber of Deputies: 0 / 190 Senate: 0 / 32 | |
| Donetsk People's Republic | | Communist Party of the Donetsk People's Republic; Коммунистическая партия Донецкой Народной Республики | CPDPR; КПДНР | Boris Litvinov | 8 October 2014 | Marxism–Leninism; Soviet patriotism Left-wing nationalism | People's Council: 0 / 100 | |
| Ecuador | | Communist Party of Ecuador; Partido Comunista del Ecuador | PCE | Winston Alarcón Elizalde | 23 May 1926 | | National Assembly: 0 / 137 | |
| Ecuador | | Marxist–Leninist Communist Party of Ecuador; Partido Comunista Marxista-Leninista del Ecuador | PCMLE | Oswaldo Palacios | 1 August 1964 | Marxism–Leninism; Stalinism; Hoxhaism; Anti-revisionism | National Assembly: 0 / 137 | |
| Ecuador | | Workers' Party of Ecuador; Partido de los Trabajadores del Ecuador | PTE | | 1996 | Marxism-Leninism | National Assembly: 0 / 137 | Not registered with Ecuador's National Electoral Council |
| Ecuador | | Communist Party of Ecuador – Red Sun; Partido Comunista de Ecuador – Sol Rojo | PCE-SR | | 1 June 1987 | Marxism-Leninism-Maoism; Gonzalo Thought; Anti-revisionism; Revolutionary socialism | Banned | Engaged in minor guerrilla warfare against the government of Ecuador, with the goal of starting a people's war |
| Egypt | | Egyptian Communist Party الحزب الشيوعي المصري | ECP | Salah Adli | 1975 | Marxism–Leninism | House of Representatives: 0 / 596 Senate: 0 / 300 | |
| Egypt | | Revolutionary Socialists الاشتراكيون الثوريون | RS | Collective leadership | 1995 | Trotskyism | House of Representatives: 0 / 596 Senate: 0 / 300 | |
| Egypt | | Workers Democratic Party حزب العمال الديمقراطي | WDR | | 2011 | Labourism; Socialism; Anti-Zionism | House of Representatives: 0 / 596 Senate: 0 / 300 | |
| El Salvador | | Communist Party of El Salvador; Partido Comunista de El Salvador | PCS | | 27 March 2005 | Marxism–Leninism | Legislative Assembly: 0 / 84 | |
| Estonia | | Communist Party of Estonia; Eestimaa Kommunistlik Partei | EKP | vacant | 26 March 1990 | Marxism–Leninism; Soviet patriotism | Banned | Banned in Estonia following the 1991 Soviet coup d'état attempt, continues to operate underground |
| Eswatini | | Communist Party of Swaziland | CPS | Thokozane Kenneth | 9 April 2011 | Marxism–Leninism; Republicanism | | Participant in the 2021–2023 Eswatini protests |
| Ethiopia | | All-Ethiopia Socialist Movement መላ ኢትዮጵያ ሶሻሊስት ንቅናቄ | MEISON | | 1968 | Marxism–Leninism | House of Peoples' Representatives: 0 / 547 House of Federation: 0 / 112 | Supported and participated in the 1974 Ethiopian Revolution. Initially supported the Derg government, though later broke with Mengistu Haile Mariam's leadership during the Red Terror and was forced underground. Resumed legal activity following the end of the Ethiopian Civil War. |
| Finland | | Communist Party of Finland; Suomen Kommunistinen Puolue | SKP | Juha-Pekka Väisänen | 1984 | Marxism–Leninism | Parliament : 0 / 200 | |
| Finland | | Communist Workers' Party – For Peace and Socialism; Kommunistinen Työväenpuolue – Rauhan ja Sosialismin puolesta | KTP | Mikko Vartiainen | 1988 | Marxism–Leninism; Hard Euroscepticism | Parliament : 0 / 200 | |
| Finland | | League of Communists; Kommunistien Liitto | KL | Kalevi Wahrman | 14 September 2002 | Marxism–Leninism | Parliament : 0 / 200 | |
| France | | French Communist Party; Parti communiste français | PCF | Fabien Roussel | 30 December 1920 | Eurocommunism; Soft Euroscepticism | National Assembly: 12 / 577 Senate: 14 / 348 | |
| France | | Lutte Ouvrière | LO | Nathalie Arthaud | 1956 | Trotskyism | National Assembly: 0 / 577 Senate: 0 / 348 | |
| France | | Marxist–Leninist Communist Organization – Proletarian Way; Organisation communiste marxiste-léniniste – Voie prolétarienne | OCML-VP | | September 1976 | Marxism-Leninism; Maoism | National Assembly: 0 / 577 Senate: 0 / 348 | |
| France | | New Anticapitalist Party; Nouveau Parti anticapitaliste | NPA | Collective leadership | 8 February 2009 | Trotskyism; Alter-globalisation | National Assembly: 0 / 577 Senate: 0 / 348 | |
| France | | Pole of Communist Revival in France; Pôle de renaissance communiste en France | PRCF | Léon Landini | January 2004 | Marxism-Leninism; Left-wing nationalism Hard Euroscepticism | National Assembly: 0 / 577 Senate: 0 / 348 | |
| France | | Revolutionary Left; Gauche révolutionnaire | GR | | 1992 | Marxism; Trotskyism | National Assembly: 0 / 577 Senate: 0 / 348 | |
| France | | Workers' Communist Party of France; Parti communiste des ouvriers de France | PCOF | Collective leadership | 1979 | Marxism-Leninism; Hoxhaism; Anti-revisionism | National Assembly: 0 / 577 Senate: 0 / 348 | |
| Georgia | | Unified Communist Party of Georgia საქართველოს ერთიანი კომუნისტური პარტია | SEKP სეკპ | Teimuraz Samnidze | June 1994 | Marxism–Leninism; Soviet patriotism | Parliament: 0 / 150 | |
| Germany | | Communist Party; Kommunistische Partei | KP | Central Committee | June 2024 | Marxism-Leninism; Anti-revisionism | Bundestag: 0 / 630 | |
| Germany | | Communist Party of Germany; Kommunistische Partei Deutschlands | KPD | Torsten Schöwitz | 1990 | Marxism-Leninism; Hard Euroscepticism | Bundestag: 0 / 630 | |
| Germany | | German Communist Party; Deutsche Kommunistische Partei | DKP | Patrik Köbele | 1968 | Marxism-Leninism | Bundestag: 0 / 630 | |
| Germany | | Marxist–Leninist Party of Germany; Marxistisch-Leninistische Partei Deutschlands | MLPD | Gabi Fechtner | 1982 | Marxism-Leninism; Maoism | Bundestag: 0 / 630 | |
| Germany | | Socialist Equality Party; Sozialistische Gleichheitspartei | SGP | Christoph Vandreier | 1971 | Trotskyism | Bundestag: 0 / 630 | |
| Greece | | Communist Party of Greece; Κομμουνιστικό Κόμμα Ελλάδας | KKE; KKE | Dimitris Koutsoumpas | 17 November 1918 | Marxism-Leninism; Hard Euroscepticism | Hellenic Parliament: 26 / 300 | Banned by the government of Greece from 1936 to 1974. Led the PEEA during World War II and the Provisional Democratic Government and DAG during the Greek Civil War. |
| Greece | | Communist Party of Greece (Marxist–Leninist); Κομμουνιστικό Κόμμα Ελλάδας (μαρξιστικο-λενινιστικό) | KKE (m–l); ΚΚΕ (μ-λ) | Grigoris Konstantopoulos | November 1976 | Marxism-Leninism; Maoism; Anti-revisionism; Hoxhaism; Euroscepticism | Hellenic Parliament: 0 / 300 | |
| Greece | | Communist Renewal; Κομμουνιστική Ανανέωση | KA; KA | Collective leadership | 2000 | Marxism; Euroscepticism | Hellenic Parliament: 0 / 300 | |
| Greece | | Left Anti-capitalist Group; Αριστερή Αντικαπιταλιστική Συσπείρωση | AR.A.S; ΑΡ.Α.Σ | Collective leadership | 1998 | Maoism | Hellenic Parliament: 0 / 300 | |
| Greece | | Left Group; Αριστερή Συσπείρωση | ARI.S; ΑΡΙ.Σ | Collective leadership | 25 October 2012 | Marxism-Leninism; Maoism; Anti-revisionism | Hellenic Parliament: 0 / 300 | |
| Greece | | Left Recomposition; Αριστερή Ανασύνθεση | AR.ΑΝ; ΑΡ.ΑΝ | | 2003 | Maoism | Hellenic Parliament: 0 / 300 | |
| Greece | | Marxist Leninist Communist Party of Greece; Μαρξιστικό-Λενινιστικό Κομμουνιστικό Κόμμα Ελλάδας | M-L KKE; Μ-Λ ΚΚΕ | Collective leadership | November 1976 | Marxism-Leninism; Maoism; Anti-revisionism; Euroscepticism | Hellenic Parliament: 0 / 300 | |
| Greece | | Movement for the Reorganization of the Communist Party of Greece 1918–1955; Κίνηση για την Ανασύνταξη του Κομμουνιστικό Κόμμα Ελλάδας 1918–1955) | Anasintaxi; Ανασύνταξη | Tasos Mpallos | 1996 | Marxism-Leninism; Stalinism; Hoxhaism; Zachariadism; Anti-revisionism | Hellenic Parliament: 0 / 300 | |
| Greece | | New Left Current; Νέο Αριστερό Ρεύμα | NAR; ΝΑΡ | Collective leadership | 1989 | New Left | Hellenic Parliament: 0 / 300 | |
| Greece | | Organization for the Reconstruction of the Communist Party of Greece; Οργάνωση για την Ανασυγκρότηση του Κομουνιστικού Κόμματος Ελλάδας | OAKKE; OAKKE | Elias Zafiropoulos. | 20 July 1985 | Marxism-Leninism; Maoism | Hellenic Parliament: 0 / 300 | |
| Greece | | Revolutionary Communist Movement of Greece; Επαναστατικό Κομμουνιστικό Κίνημα Ελλάδας | EKKE; EKKE | Collective leadership | 1970 | Marxism-Leninism; Maoism; Anti-revisionism | Hellenic Parliament: 0 / 300 | |
| Guadeloupe | | Guadeloupe Communist Party; Parti communiste guadeloupéen | PCG | Alain-Félix Flémin | 30 March 1958 | Marxism; Guadeloupean autonomy | National Assembly: 0 / 577 Senate: 0 / 348 | |
| Haiti | | New Communist Party of Haiti (Marxist-Leninist); Nouveau Parti Communiste Haïtien (Marxiste–Léniniste) | NPCH(ML) | Vania Lubin | 2000 | Marxism–Leninism; Stalinism; Maoism; Anti-revisionism | Chamber of Deputies: 0 / 119 Senate: 0 / 30 | |
| Hungary | | Hungarian Workers' Party; Magyar Munkáspárt | MMP | Gyula Thürmer | 17 December 1989 | Marxism-Leninism; Euroscepticism | National Assembly: 0 / 199 | |
| Hungary | | Workers' Party of Hungary 2006 – European Left; Magyarországi Munkáspárt 2006 – Európai Baloldal | EB | Attila Vajnai | November 2005 | Marxism; Eurocommunism | National Assembly: 0 / 199 | |
| India | | Communist Party of India (Marxist) | CPI(M) | M. A. Baby | 7 November 1964 | Marxism–Leninism | Lok Sabha: 4 / 543 Rajya Sabha: 5 / 245 | |
| India | | Communist Party of India | CPI | D. Raja | 26 December 1925 | Marxism–Leninism | Lok Sabha: 2 / 543 Rajya Sabha: 2 / 245 | |
| India | | Communist Party of India (Marxist–Leninist) Liberation | CPI(ML)L | Dipankar Bhattacharya | 1974 | Marxism–Leninism; Maoism; Naxalism | Lok Sabha: 2 / 543 Rajya Sabha: 0 / 245 | |
| India | | Revolutionary Socialist Party | RSP | Manoj Bhattacharya | 19 March 1940 | Marxism–Leninism; Trotskyism | Lok Sabha: 1 / 543 Rajya Sabha: 0 / 245 | |
| India | | All India Forward Bloc | AIFB | Debabrata Biswas | 22 June 1939 | Marxism; Left-wing nationalism Socialism | Lok Sabha: 0 / 543 Rajya Sabha: 0 / 245 | |
| India | | Bolshevik Party of India | BPI | | 1939 | Marxism–Leninism | Lok Sabha: 0 / 543 Rajya Sabha: 0 / 245 | |
| India | | Communist Marxist Party | CMP | C. P. John | 1986 | Marxism–Leninism; Marxism; Luxemburgism | Lok Sabha: 0 / 543 Rajya Sabha: 0 / 245 | |
| India | | Communist Party of India (Marxist–Leninist) New Democracy | CPIML ND | Yatendra Kumar | 1988 | Naxalism; New Democracy; Maoism | Lok Sabha: 0 / 543 Rajya Sabha: 0 / 245 | |
| India | | Marxist Forward Bloc | MFB | Jaihind Singh | 12 November 1953 | Marxism; Left-wing populism | Lok Sabha: 0 / 543 Rajya Sabha: 0 / 245 | |
| India | | Revolutionary Communist Party of India | RCPI | Biren Deka | 1 August 1934 | Marxism-Leninism; Anti-Stalinism | Lok Sabha: 0 / 543 Rajya Sabha: 0 / 245 | |
| India | | Revolutionary Marxist Party of India | RMPI | Mangat Ram Pasla | 2016 | Marxism–Leninism | Lok Sabha: 0 / 543 Rajya Sabha: 0 / 245 | |
| India | | Revolutionary Socialist Party of India (Marxist–Leninist) | RSPI(ML) | | 1969 | Marxism–Leninism | Lok Sabha: 0 / 543 Rajya Sabha: 0 / 245 | |
| India | | Socialist Unity Centre of India (Communist) | SUCI(C) | Provash Ghosh | 24 April 1948 | Shibdas Ghosh Thought; Marxism–Leninism; Anti-revisionism | Lok Sabha: 0 / 543 Rajya Sabha: 0 / 245 | |
| India | | Communist Party of India (Maoist) | CPI (Maoist) | Nambala Keshava Rao | 21 September 2004 | Naxalism; Marxism–Leninism–Maoism | Banned | Leading the ongoing Naxalite–Maoist insurgency, designated a terrorist organization by the government of India |
| Iran | | Communist Party of Iran حزب کمونیست ایران | CPI | Collective leadership | 2 September 1983 | Marxism-Leninism; Revolutionary socialism | | |
| Iran | | Communist Party of Iran (Marxist–Leninist–Maoist) حزب کمونیست ایران (مارکسیست-لنینیست-مائوئیست) | CPI (MLM) | | 2001 | Marxism-Leninism-Maoism; New Synthesis; Secularism | | |
| Iran | | Fedaian Organisation (Minority) سازمان فدائیان (اقليت) | FO | Akbar Kāmyābi | March 1987 | Marxism-Leninism | | Split from the Organization of Iranian People's Fedai Guerrillas (Minority) |
| Iran | | Iranian People's Fedai Guerrillas چریک‌های فدایی خلق ایران | IFPG | Ashraf Dehghani | 1979 | Marxism-Leninism | | Participant in the 1979 Kurdish rebellion |
| Iran | | Komala of the Toilers of Kurdistan کومله زحمتکشان کردستان کۆمه‌ڵه‌ی زه‌حمه‌تکیشانی کوردستان | KTK | Omar Ilkhanizade | 2007 | Marxism-Leninism | | |
| Iran | | Komalah کۆمەڵە ڕێکخراوی کوردستانی حیزبی کۆمۆنیستی ئێران کومله سازمان کردستان حزب کمونیست ایران | | Ibrahim Alizade | 1984 | Marxism-Leninism; Internationalism; Kurdish minority interests | | Kurdish branch of CPI, designated a terrorist organization by the government of Iran |
| Iran | | Laborers' Party of Iran حزب رنجبران ایران | LPI | | 1979 | Maoism | | |
| Iran | | Labour Party of Iran حزب کار ایران | LPI | | 1965 | Marxism-Leninism; Hoxhaism; Anti-revisionism | | |
| Iran | | Organization of Iranian People's Fedai Guerrillas (1985) سازمان چریک‌های فدایی خلق ایران | OIPFG | Ḥosayn Zohari | 1985 | Marxism-Leninism | | Split from the Organization of Iranian People's Fedai Guerrillas (Minority) |
| Iran | | Organization of Iranian People's Fedai Guerrillas – Followers of the Identity Platform سازمان چریک‌های فدایی خلق ایران – پیرو برنامه هویت | OIPFG – FIP | Mehdi Sāmeʿ | 1983 | Marxism-Leninism | | Split from the Organization of Iranian People's Fedai Guerrillas (Minority) |
| Iran | | Socialist Workers' Party of Iran حزب کارگران سوسیالیست ایران | SWPI | Babak Zahraei | 1979 | Trotskyism | | |
| Iran | | Tudeh Party of Iran حزب تودۀ ایران | | Collective leadership | 2 October 1941 | Marxism-Leninism; Stalinism; Left-wing nationalism Anti-revisionism | | |
| Iran | | Worker-communist Party of Iran حزب کمونیست کارگری ایران | WPI | Hamid Taqvaee | 1991 | Workerism; Marxism; Third camp | | |
| Iran | | Worker-communist Party of Iran – Hekmatist حزب کمونیست کارگری ایران-حکمتیست | WPI-Hekmatist | Jamal Kamangar | 2004 | Workerism | | |
| Iran | | Worker's Way راه کارگر | WW | | 1978 | Marxism-Leninism | | |
| Iran | | Workers Left Unity – Iran اتحاد چپ کارگری ایران | WLU-I | | 1978 | Marxism-Leninism | | |
| Iraq | | Communist Party of Kurdistan – Iraq حزبي شيوعى كوردستان – عيراق الحزب الشيوعي الكوردستاني – العراق | | Kawa Mahmud | 1993 | Marxism-Leninism; Kurdish nationalism Nonsectarianism | Council of Representatives: 0 / 329 Kurdistan Parliament: 1 / 111 | Regional party active in Kurdistan |
| Iraq | | Iraqi Communist Party الحزب الشيوعي العراقي | ICP | Raid Jahid Fahmi | 31 March 1934 | Marxism; Leninism; Classical Marxism; Reformism; Secularism; Nonsectarianism | Council of Representatives: 0 / 329 | Operated underground in the Kingdom of Iraq (from 1934 to 1958) and Ba'athist Iraq (from 1963 to 2003). Supported the 14 July Revolution and the government of Abd al-Karim Qasim. |
| Iraq | | Left Worker-communist Party of Iraq الحزب الشيوعي العمالي اليساري العراقي | | Samir Noory | 2004 | Workerism; Third camp | Council of Representatives: 0 / 329 | |
| Iraq | | Movement of the Democratic People of Kurdistan بزووتنەوەی دیموکراتی گەلی کوردستان | MDPK | Mam Xidir | 1994 | Marxism | Council of Representatives: 0 / 329 Kurdistan Parliament: 0 / 111 | |
| Iraq | | Worker-communist Party of Iraq الحزب الشيوعي العمالي العراقي | | Samir Adil | July 1993 | Marxism; Workerism | Council of Representatives: 0 / 329 | |
| Iraq | | Worker-communist Party of Kurdistan حزبی کۆمۆنستی کرێکاریی کوردستان الحزب الشيوعي العمالي في كوردستان | | Osman Hajy Marouf | 2008 | Marxism; Workerism; Third camp | Council of Representatives: 0 / 329 Kurdistan Parliament: 0 / 111 | Regional party active in Kurdistan |
| Ireland | | Communist Party of Ireland; Páirtí Cumannach na hÉireann | CPI | Janelle McAteer | 3–4 June 1933 | Marxism-Leninism; Hard Euroscepticism | Dáil Éireann: 0 / 160 Seanad Éireann: 0 / 60 | |
| Ireland | | Irish Republican Socialist Party; Páirtí Poblachtach Sóisalach na hÉireann | IRSP | Collective leadership (Ard Comhairle) | 8 December 1974 | Marxism-Leninism; Irish republicanism Anti-globalisation; Hard Euroscepticism | Dáil Éireann: 0 / 160 Seanad Éireann: 0 / 60 | |
| Ireland | | Workers' Party; Páirtí na nOibrithe | | Collective leadership | 28 November 1905 | Marxism-Leninism; Irish republicanism | Dáil Éireann: 0 / 160 Seanad Éireann: 0 / 60 | |
| Israel | | The Democratic Front for Peace and Equality החזית הדמוקרטית לשלום ולשוויון الجبهة الديمقراطية للسلاموالمساواة | Hadash חד״ש حداش | Ayman Odeh | 15 March 1977 | Socialism; Communism; Two-state solution Anti-Zionism; Israeli Arab interests | Knesset: 4 / 120 | Formed from a merger of Rakah, the Black Panthers, and Moked. Formerly part of the Joint List. |
| Israel | | Communist Party of Israel המפלגה הקומוניסטית הישראלית الحزب الشيوعي الاسرائيلي | Maki מק״י ماكي | Collective leadership | 1 September 1965 | Communism; Alter-globalization; Anti-Zionism; Marxism-Leninism (self-identified); Factions: Stalinism; Anti-Stalinism | Knesset: 2 / 120 | Merged into Hadash in 1977 and as of 2022 its largest faction. |
| Israel | | Da'am Workers Party דעם מפלגת פועלים حزب دعم العمالي | Da'am דע"ם دعم | Collective leadership | 1995 | Secularism; Marxism; Revolutionary socialism Postnationalism; Non-Zionism; One-state solution | Knesset: 0 / 120 | |
| Italy | | Communist Alternative Party; Partito di Alternativa Comunista | PdAC | Francesco Ricci | 7 January 2007 | Trotskyism | Chamber of Deputies: 0 / 400 Senate: 0 / 206 | |
| Italy | | Communist Front; Fronte Comunista | FC | Gianmarco Chilelli | November 2021 | Marxism-Leninism; Anti-revisionism | Chamber of Deputies: 0 / 400 Senate: 0 / 206 | |
| Italy | | Communist Party; Partito Comunista | PC | Marco Rizzo | 3 July 2009 | Marxism-Leninism; Anti-revisionism; Hard Euroscepticism; Sovereigntism | Chamber of Deputies: 0 / 400 Senate: 0 / 206 | |
| Italy | | Communist Refoundation Party; Partito della Rifondazione Comunista | PRC | Maurizio Acerbo | 6 January 1991 | Soft Euroscepticism | Chamber of Deputies: 0 / 400 Senate: 0 / 206 | |
| Italy | | Italian Communist Party; Partito Comunista Italiano | PCI | Mauro Alboresi | 26 June 2016 | Marxism-Leninism; Euroscepticism | Chamber of Deputies: 0 / 400 Senate: 0 / 206 | |
| Italy | | Italian Marxist–Leninist Party; Partito Marxista-Leninista Italiano | PMLI | Giovanni Scuderi | April 1977 | Marxism-Leninism; Maoism; Anti-revisionism | Chamber of Deputies: 0 / 400 Senate: 0 / 206 | |
| Ivory Coast | | Revolutionary Communist Party of Ivory Coast; Parti Communiste Révolutionnaire de Côte d'Ivoire | PCRCI | Achy Ekissi | 1990 | Marxism–Leninism; Hoxhaism; Anti-revisionism | | |
| Japan | | Japanese Communist Party 日本共産党 | JCP | Tomoko Tamura | 15 July 1922 | Scientific socialism Progressivism; Pacifism; Democratic socialism | Representatives: 10 / 465 Councillors: 11 / 248 | Banned in 1925 under the Peace Preservation Law. Legalized by the Allied military occupation following Japan's defeat in World War II. |
| Japan | | Japanese Communist Party (Action Faction) 日本共産党 (行動派) | | | 1980 | Marxism-Leninism; Stalinism; Maoism; Anti-revisionism | Representatives: 0 / 465 Councillors: 0 / 248 | |
| Japan | | Japanese Communist Party (Left Faction) 日本共産党 (左派) | | | 1969 | Marxism-Leninism-Maoism; Anti-revisionism | Representatives: 0 / 465 Councillors: 0 / 248 | |
| Jordan | | Jordanian Communist Party الحزب الشیوعی الاردني | JCP | Faraj Al-Tameezi | 1948 | Marxism-Leninism; Republicanism | House of Representatives: 0 / 130 Senate: 0 / 75 | |
| Jordan | | Jordanian Democratic People's Party حزب الشعب الديمقراطي الأردني | HASHD | | 1989 | Marxism-Leninism; Palestinian nationalism Anti-Zionism; Left-wing nationalism Secularism | House of Representatives: 0 / 130 Senate: 0 / 75 | |
| Kazakhstan | | Communist Party of Kazakhstan; Қазақстан Коммунистік партиясы / Qazaqstan Kommunistık Partiasy; Коммунистическая партия Казахстана | ҚКП / QKP; КПК | Toleubek Makhzhanov | 16 October 1991 | Marxism-Leninism; Soviet patriotism | Banned | |
| Kazakhstan | | Socialist Movement of Kazakhstan; Қазақстанның Социалистік Қозғалысы / Qazaqstannıñ Socïalïstik Qozğalısı; Социалистическое Движение Казахстана | ҚСҚ / QSQ; СДК | Ainur Kurmanov | 20–21 May 2006 | Marxism-Leninism | Banned | |
| Kenya | | Communist Party of Kenya | CPK | Mwandawiro Mgangah | 1992 | Marxism–Leninism; Pan-Africanism; Maoism; Social democracy (until 2019) | National Assembly: 0 / 349 Senate: 0 / 67 | |
| Kenya | | Communist Party Marxist – Kenya | CPMK | Booker Omole | 2024 | Marxism-Leninism | Unregistered | |
| Kuwait | | Kuwaiti Progressive Movement الحركة التقدمية الكويتية | | | | Socialism; Marxism-Leninism | National Assembly: 0 / 64 | |
| Kyrgyzstan | | Communist Party of Kyrgyzstan; Кыргызстан Коммунисттик партиясы Коммунистическая Партия Киргизстана | KPK; КПК | Clara Azhibekovna | 29 August 1999 | Marxism-Leninism | Supreme Council: 0 / 90 | |
| Kyrgyzstan | | Party of Communists of Kyrgyzstan; Кыргызстан Коммунисттеринин Партиясы; Партия Коммунистов Киргизии | PKK; ПКК | Iskhak Masaliyev | 22 June 1992 | Marxism-Leninism; Soviet patriotism | Supreme Council: 0 / 90 | |
| Latvia | | Socialist Party of Latvia; Latvijas Sociālistiskā partija | LSP | Vladimirs Frolovs | 15 January 1994 | Marxism-Leninism | Saeima: 0 / 100 | |
| Lebanon | | Lebanese Communist Party الحزب الشيوعي اللبناني; Parti communiste libanais | LCP; PCL | Hanna Gharib | 1924 | Marxism-Leninism; Nonsectarianism; Socialism; Anti-Zionism | Parliament: 1 / 128 | |
| Lebanon | | Arab Socialist Action Party – Lebanon حزب العمل الاشتراكي العربي – لبنان; Parti d’action socialiste arabe – Liban | ASAP-L; PASA-L | George Habash | 1969 | Marxism | Parliament: 0 / 128 | |
| Lebanon | | Communist Action Organization in Lebanon منظمة العمل الشيوعي في لبنان; Organisation de l'Action Communiste du Liban | CAOL; OACL | Zaki Taha | 1970 | Marxism-Leninism; Maoism | Parliament: 0 / 128 | |
| Lebanon | | Revolutionary Communist Group المجموعة الشيوعية الثورية; Groupe communiste révolutionnaire | RCG; GCR | Collective leadership | 1970 | Trotskyism | Parliament: 0 / 128 | |
| Lebanon | | Toilers League رابطة الشغيلة; Ligue des Travailleurs | TL; LDT | Zaher el-Khatib | 1960s | Marxism–Leninism | Parliament: 0 / 128 | |
| Lesotho | | Communist Party of Lesotho; Mokhatlo oa Makomonisi a Lesotho | CPL | Manny Stevenson | 5 May 1962 | Marxism-Leninism | National Assembly: 0 / 120 Senate: 0 / 33 | |
| Lithuania | | Socialist People's Front; Socialistinis liaudies frontas | SLF | Giedrius Grabauskas | 2009 | Marxism-Leninism; Democratic socialism Left-wing nationalism Socialism | Seimas: 0 / 141 | |
| Lithuania | | Communist Party of Lithuania; Lietuvos komunistų partija | LKP | vacant | 1 October 1918 | Marxism-Leninism; Soviet patriotism | Banned | Banned in Lithuania following the 1991 Soviet coup attempt, continues to operate underground |
| Luxembourg | | Communist Party of Luxembourg; Kommunistesch Partei vu Lëtzebuerg; Parti Communiste Luxembourgeois; Kommunistische Partei Luxemburgs | KPL; PCL | Ali Ruckert | 2 January 1921 | Marxism-Leninism; Hard Euroscepticism | Chamber of Deputies: 0 / 60 | |
| Madagascar | | Congress Party for the Independence of Madagascar; Antoko'ny Kongresi'ny Fahaleovantenan'i Madagasikara | AKFM | | 8 November 1958 | Marxism | National Assembly: 0 / 151 Senate: 0 / 18 | Member of the ruling National Front for the Defense of the Revolution from 1976 to 1989 |
| Mali | | African Solidarity for Democracy and Independence; Solidarité Africaine pour la Démocratie et l'Indépendance | SADI | Oumar Mariko | 1996 | Marxism-Leninism; Pan-Africanism | Banned | In May 2025 Assimi Goita dissolved all political parties in the country. |
| Mali | | Malian Party of Labour; Parti malien du travail | PMT | | 1965 | Marxism-Leninism; Hoxhaism | Banned | In May 2025 Assimi Goita dissolved all political parties in the country. |
| Malta | | Communist Party of Malta; Partit Komunista Malti | PKM | Victor Degiovanni | 1969 | Marxism-Leninism | House of Representatives: 0 / 79 | |
| Martinique | | Communist Party for Independence and Socialism; Parti Communiste pour l'Indépendance et le Socialisme; Pati Kominis pou Lendépandans èk Sosyalism | PCLS; PKLS | | 22 May 1984 | Marxism–Leninism; Martinican independence | Assembly of Martinique: 0 / 51 | |
| Martinique | | Martinican Communist Party; Parti communiste martiniquais | PCM | Georges Erichot | September 1957 | Autonomism | Assembly of Martinique: 0 / 51 | |
| Mexico | | Communist Party of Mexico; Partido Comunista de México | PCM | Pável Blanco Cabrera | 20 November 1994 | Marxism–Leninism | Chamber of Deputies: 0 / 500 Senate of the Republic: 0 / 128 | |
| Mexico | | Communist Party of Mexico (Marxist–Leninist); Partido Comunista de México (Marxista-Leninista) | PCM (ML) | | 1978 | Marxism–Leninism; Stalinism; Hoxhaism; Anti-revisionism | Chamber of Deputies: 0 / 500 Senate of the Republic: 0 / 128 | |
| Mexico | | Communists' Party; Partido de los Comunistas | PdelosC | Luis Alfonso Vargas Silva | 2003 | Marxism–Leninism | Chamber of Deputies: 0 / 500 Senate of the Republic: 0 / 128 | |
| Mexico | | Popular Socialist Party | PSP | | 1948 | Marxism–Leninism | Chamber of Deputies: 0 / 500 Senate of the Republic: 0 / 128 | |
| Mexico | | Popular Socialist Party of Mexico; Partido Popular Socialista de México | PPSM | Cuauhtémoc Amezcua Dromundo | 1997 | Marxism–Leninism; Latin American integration | Chamber of Deputies: 0 / 500 Senate of the Republic: 0 / 128 | Not registered or recognized by the INE |
| Mexico | | Workers' Revolutionary Party; Partido Revolucionario de los Trabajadores | WRP | | 2009 | Trotskyism | Chamber of Deputies: 0 / 500 Senate of the Republic: 0 / 128 | Dissolved in 1996, revived in 2009 |
| Moldova | | Party of Communists of the Republic of Moldova; Partidul Comuniștilor din Republica Moldova | PCRM | Vladimir Voronin | 22 October 1993 | Marxism–Leninism; Social conservatism Soviet patriotism Moldovenism; Pro-Russia | Parliament: 8 / 101 | Member of BECS |
| Montenegro | | Yugoslav Communist Party of Montenegro; Jugoslovenska komunistička partija Југословенска комунистичка партија | JKP CG / ЈКП-ЦГ | Radislav Stanišić | 25 September 2009 | Titoism; Pensioners' rights Yugo-nostalgia | Parliament: 0 / 81 | |
| Morocco | | Democratic Way النهج الديمقراطي | | Abdallah El Harif | 1995 | Marxism; Anti-revisionism; Hoxhaism | House of Representatives: 0 / 395 House of Councillors: 0 / 120 | |
| Myanmar | | Communist Party of Burma ဗမာပြည်ကွန်မြူနစ်ပါတီ | CPB | | 15 August 1939 | Marxism-Leninism; Maoism; Federalism | Banned | Led an insurgency from 1948 to 1989. Rearmed in 2021 and currently engaged in guerrilla warfare against the SAC |
| Namibia | | Workers Revolutionary Party | WRP | Collective leadership | May 1989 | Trotskyism | National Assembly: 0 / 104 National Council: 0 / 42 | |
| Nepal | | Communist Party of Nepal (Unified Marxist–Leninist) नेपाल कम्युनिष्ट पार्टी (एकीकृत मार्क्सवादी-लेनिनवादी) | CPN (UML) नेकपा (एमाले) | K. P. Sharma Oli | 6 January 1991 | Marxism–Leninism; People's Multiparty Democracy | House of Representatives: 25 / 275 National Assembly: 11 / 59 | Merged with the CPN (MC) to form the NCP in 2018, refounded in 2021 |
| Nepal | | Communist Party of Nepal (Marxist) नेपाल कम्युनिष्ट पार्टी (मार्क्सवादी) | | Durga Prasad Gyawali | 2006 | Marxism-Leninism | House of Representatives: 0 / 275 National Assembly: 0 / 59 | |
| Nepal | | Communist Party of Nepal (Marxist–Leninist) नेपाल कम्युनिष्ट पार्टी (मार्क्सवादी-लेनिनवादी) | CPN (ML) | C. P. Mainali | 17 February 2002 | Marxism-Leninism | House of Representatives: 0 / 275 National Assembly: 0 / 59 | |
| Nepal | | Communist Party of Nepal (Revolutionary Maoist) नेपाल कम्यूनिष्ट पार्टी (क्रान्तिकारी माओवादी) | CPN (RM) | Mohan Baidya | 19 June 2012 | Marxism-Leninism-Maoism | House of Representatives: 0 / 275 National Assembly: 0 / 59 | Operates underground and participates in elections through a front organization; the Patriotic People's Republican Front |
| Nepal | | Nepal Majdoor Kisan Party नेपाल मजदुर किसान पार्टी | NWPP | Narayan Man Bijukchhe | 23 January 1975 | Marxism-Leninism; Maoism; Juche | House of Representatives: 0 / 275 National Assembly: 0 / 59 | |
| Nepal | | Nepali Communist Party नेपाली कम्युनिष्ट पार्टी | NCP नेकपा | Pushpa Kamal Dahal | 5 November 2025 | Marxism–Leninism | Pratinidhi Sabha: 17 / 275 Rastriya Sabha: 18 / 59 | |
| Nepal | | Rastriya Janamorcha राष्ट्रिय जनमोर्चा | | Chitra Bahadur K.C. | 2006 | Marxism–Leninism; Maoism; Anti-federalism | Rastriya Sabha: 1 / 59 | Electoral front of CPN (Masal) |
| Netherlands | | Communist Party of the Netherlands; Communistische Partij van Nederland | CPN | Job Pruijser | 14 November 1992 | Marxism–Leninism; Euroscepticism | House of Representatives: 0 / 150 Senate: 0 / 75 | |
| Netherlands | | Group of Marxist–Leninists/Red Dawn; Groep Marxisten-Lenisten/Rode Morgen | GML/Rode Morgen | Jeroen Toussaint | 1977 | Marxism–Leninism; Maoism; Anti-revisionism | House of Representatives: 0 / 150 Senate: 0 / 75 | |
| Netherlands | | United Communist Party; Verenigde Communistische Partij | VCP | Engel Modderman | 1999 | Marxism–Leninism | House of Representatives: 0 / 150 Senate: 0 / 75 | |
| New Zealand | | Communist League | The League | | 1969 | Marxism–Leninism | House of Representatives: 0 / 120 | |
| Nicaragua | | Communist Party of Nicaragua; Partido Comunista de Nicaragua | PCdeN; PCN | | 12 October 1967 | Marxism–Leninism | National Assembly: 0 / 90 | |
| Nicaragua | | Marxist–Leninist Popular Action Movement; Movimiento de Acción Popular – Marxista–Leninista | MAP-ML | | 1972 | Marxism–Leninism; Hoxhaism; Anti-revisionism | National Assembly: 0 / 90 | |
| North Macedonia | | Communist Party of Macedonia–Tito's Forces; Комунистичка партија на Македонија — Титови сили | KPM-TS; КПМ—ТС | Goran Arsovski | 26 October 2005 | Marxism-Leninism; Titoism | Assembly: 0 / 120 | |
| Norway | | Red Party; Rødt | R | Marie Sneve Martinussen | 11 March 2007 | Democratic socialism Revolutionary socialism Marxism | Storting: 8 / 169 | |
| Norway | | Communist Party of Norway; Norges Kommunistiske Parti | NKP | Runa Evensen | 4 November 1923 | Marxism-Leninism; Hard Euroscepticism | Storting: 0 / 169 | |
| Pakistan | | Communist Party of Pakistan کمیونسٹ پارٹی آف پاکستان | CPP | Imdad Qazi | 6 March 1948 | Marxism-Leninism | National Assembly: 0 / 342 Senate: 0 / 100 | Not registered with the Election Commission of Pakistan |
| Pakistan | | Mazdoor Kisan Party مزدور کسان پارٹی | MKP | Afzal Khamosh | 1 May 1968 | Marxism-Leninism; Maoism | National Assembly: 0 / 342 Senate: 0 / 100 | |
| Palestine | | Popular Front for the Liberation of Palestine الجبهة الشعبية لتحرير فلسطين | PFLP | Ahmad Sa'adat | 11 December 1967 | Palestinian nationalism Marxism–Leninism; Revolutionary socialism Pan-Arabism; Arab nationalism One-state solution Anti-Zionism | Legislative Council: 3 / 132 | Member of the Palestine Liberation Organization |
| Palestine | | Democratic Front for the Liberation of Palestine الجبهة الشعبية لتحرير فلسطين | DFLP | Nayef Hawatmeh | 22 February 1969 | Marxism–Leninism; Maoism; Palestinian nationalism Left-wing nationalism Anti-Zionism | Legislative Council: 1 / 132 | Member of the Palestine Liberation Organization |
| Palestine | | Palestinian People's Party حزب الشعب الفلسطيني | PPP | Bassam Al-Salhi | February 1982 | Marxism; Palestinian nationalism Left-wing nationalism | Legislative Council: 1 / 132 | Member of the Palestine Liberation Organization |
| Palestine | | Palestinian Communist Party الحزب الشیوعي الفلسطیني | PCP | Mahmoud Saadeh | December 1991 | Marxism-Leninism; Palestinian nationalism | Legislative Council: 0 / 132 | |
| Palestine | | Revolutionary Palestinian Communist Party الحزب الشيوعي الفلسطيني-الثوري | RPCP | Arabi Awwad | October 1982 | Communism | Legislative Council: 0 / 132 | |
| Panama | | Communist Party (Marxist-Leninist) of Panama; Partido Comunista (marxista-leninista) de Panamá | PC(ml)P | | January 9, 1980 | Marxism-Leninism; Maoism; Anti-revisionism | National Assembly: 0 / 71 | |
| Panama | | November 29 National Liberation Movement; Movimiento de Liberación Nacional 29 de noviembre | MLN-29 | | July 29, 1970 | Marxism-Leninism | National Assembly: 0 / 71 | |
| Paraguay | | Paraguayan Communist Party; Partido Comunista Paraguayo | PCP | Najeeb Amado | 19 February 1928 | Marxism-Leninism | Chamber of Deputies: 0 / 80 Senate: 0 / 45 | |
| Paraguay | | Paraguayan Communist Party (independent); Partido Comunista Paraguayo (independiente) | PCP(i) | | 1967 | Marxism-Leninism; Maoism; Anti-revisionism | Chamber of Deputies: 0 / 80 Senate: 0 / 45 | |
| Paraguay | | Partido Patria Libre | PPL | | 3 February 1990 | Marxism–Leninism; Guevarism; Foco theory Socialist patriotism Revolutionary socialism | Chamber of Deputies: 0 / 80 Senate: 0 / 45 | |
| Peru | | Free Peru; Perú Libre | PL | Vladimir Cerron | 13 August 2008 | Socialism; Marxism–Leninism; Mariáteguism | Congress: 32 / 130 | |
| Peru | | Communist Party of Peru – Red Fatherland; Partido Comunista del Perú – Patria Roja | PCP-PR | Alberto Moreno | 1970 | Marxism–Leninism; Mariáteguism; Socialist patriotism; Anti-revisionism | Congress: 0 / 130 | Member of Together for Peru, which participated in the Free Peru-led government |
| Peru | | Peruvian Communist Party; Partido Comunista Peruano | PCP | Luis Villanueva | 9 April 1928 | Marxism–Leninism; Mariáteguism | Congress: 0 / 130 | Member of Together for Peru, which participated in the Free Peru-led government |
| Peru | | Peruvian Communist Party (Marxist–Leninist); Partido Comunista Peruano (Marxista–Leninista) | PCP (ML) | | January 1964 | Marxism-Leninism; Stalinism; Hoxhaism; Anti-revisionism; Maoism (until 1970s) | Congress: 0 / 130 | |
| Peru | | Shining Path; Sendero Luminoso | PCP; PCP-SL | | 1969 | Marxism-Leninism-Maoism; Gonzalo Thought; Anti-revisionism; Revolutionary socialism | Banned | Designated a terrorist organization by the government of Peru |
| Philippines | | Communist Party of the Philippines; Partido Komunista ng Pilipinas | CPP | Benito Tiamzon (alleged) (deceased) | 26 December 1968 | National democracy Marxism-Leninism-Maoism | House of Representatives: 0 / 316 Senate: 0 / 24 | Participant in the ongoing communist rebellion in the Philippines, designated a terrorist organization by the government of the Philippines and the United States |
| Philippines | | Philippine Communist Party-1930; Partido Komunista ng Pilipinas-1930 | PKP-1930 | Antonio E. Paris | 7 November 1930 | Marxism-Leninism; Democratic socialism | House of Representatives: 0 / 316 Senate: 0 / 24 | |
| Philippines | | Marxist–Leninist Party of the Philippines; Partido Marxista–Leninista ng Pilipinas | MLPP | | 1998 | Marxism-Leninism | Banned | Participant in the ongoing communist rebellion in the Philippines |
| Poland | | Polish Communist Party; Komunistyczna Partia Polski | KPP | Beata Karoń | 20 July 2002 | Marxism-Leninism; Left conservatism | Banned | |
| Portugal | | Portuguese Communist Party; Partido Comunista Português | PCP | Collective leadership | 6 March 1921 | Marxism-Leninism; Anti-revisionism; Hard Euroscepticism | Parliament: 6 / 230 | |
| Portugal | | Portuguese Workers' Communist Party; Partido Comunista dos Trabalhadores Portugueses | PCTP/MRPP | Maria Cidália Guerreiro | 1970 | Marxism-Leninism; Maoism; Anti-revisionism | Parliament: 0 / 230 | |
| Portugal | | Revolutionary Party of the Proletariat – Bases for Revolution; Partido Revolucionário do Proletariado – Bases pela Revolução | PRP-BR | Luis Cardoso | 17 July 2002 | Marxism; Guevarism | Parliament: 0 / 230 | Founded as a successor to the PRP-BR |
| Puerto Rico | | Communist Party of Puerto Rico; Partido Comunista de Puerto Rico | PCPR | | 2010 | Marxism-Leninism; Puerto Rican Independence | House: 0 / 51 Senate: 0 / 27 | |
| Réunion | | Communist Party of Réunion; Parti Communiste Réunionnais | PCR | Élie Hoarau | 1959 | Post-Marxism; Regionalism | National Assembly: 0 / 577 Senate: 1 / 348 | |
| Romania | | Communitarian Party of Romania; Partidul Comunitar din România | PCDR | Petre Ignatencu | 19 March 2010 | Communitarianism; Progressivism; Anti-Americanism | Chamber of Deputies: 0 / 330 Senate: 0 / 136 | |
| Romania | | Romanian Socialist Party; Partidul Socialist Român | PSR | Constantin Rotaru | July 2003 | Communism; Socialist feminism Left-wing nationalism Anti-NATO | Chamber of Deputies: 0 / 330 Senate: 0 / 136 | |
| Russia | | Communist Party of the Russian Federation; Коммунистическая Партия Российской Федерации | CPRF; КПРФ | Gennady Zyuganov | 14 February 1993 | Marxism–Leninism; Left-wing nationalism Soviet patriotism Social conservatism Neo-Stalinism | State Duma: 57 / 450 Federation Council: 4 / 178 | |
| Russia | | Left Front; Левый фронт | | Sergei Udaltsov | 18 October 2008 | Marxism–Leninism; Anti-nationalism; Internationalism | State Duma: 1 / 450 Federation Council: 0 / 178 | |
| Russia | | Communists of Russia; Коммунисты России | CPCR; РПСС | Sergey Malinkovich | 23 May 2009 | Marxism–Leninism; Stalinism; Anti-revisionism | State Duma: 0 / 450 Federation Council: 0 / 178 | |
| Russia | | Labour Russia; Трудовая Россия | LR; ТР | Stanislav Ruzanov | 7 November 1991 | Marxism–Leninism; Stalinism; Soviet patriotism Direct democracy Left-wing nationalism | State Duma: 0 / 450 Federation Council: 0 / 178 | |
| Russia | | Russian Communist Workers' Party of the Communist Party of the Soviet Union; Российская коммунистическая рабочая партия в составе Коммунистической партии Советского Союза | RCWP-CPSU; РКРП-КПСС | Stepan Malentsov | 27 October 2001 | Marxism–Leninism; Stalinism; Anti-revisionism | State Duma: 0 / 450 Federation Council: 0 / 178 | |
| Russia | | Russian Labour Front; Российский трудовой фронт | RTF; РТФ | Alexander Batov | 22 February 2010 | Marxism–Leninism | State Duma: 0 / 450 Federation Council: 0 / 178 | |
| Russia | | Russian Maoist Party; Российская маоистская партия | RMP; РМП | Collective leadership | 9 June 2000 | Marxism–Leninism–Maoism; Anti-revisionism; Proletarian internationalism Feminism | State Duma: 0 / 450 Federation Council: 0 / 178 | |
| Russia | | Russian Party of Freedom and Justice; Российская партия свободы и справедливости | RPSS; РПСС | Konstantin Rykov | 8 April 2012 | Social democracy Russian nationalism | State Duma: 0 / 450 Federation Council: 0 / 178 | |
| Serbia | | New Communist Party of Yugoslavia; Нова комунистичка партија Југославије / Nova Komunistička Partija Jugoslavije | NKPJ; НKПЈ | Aleksandar Banjanac | 30 June 1990 | Marxism–Leninism; Stalinism; Anti-revisionism; Yugoslavism; Russophilia | National Assembly: 0 / 250 | |
| Serbia | | Party of Labour; Партија рада / Partija rada | PR; ПР | Collective leadership | 28 March 1992 | Marxism–Leninism | National Assembly: 0 / 250 | |
| Slovakia | | Communist Party of Slovakia; Komunistická strana Slovenska | KSS | Jozef Hrdlička | 29 August 1992 | Marxism–Leninism | National Council: 0 / 150 | |
| Slovakia | | Dawn; Úsvit | | Luciana Hoptová | 25 May 2005 | Marxism | National Council: 0 / 150 | |
| South Africa | | Economic Freedom Fighters | EFF | Julius Malema | 26 July 2013 | Marxism–Leninism; Fanonism; Sankarism; Pan-Africanism; Black nationalism Anti-Zionism; Left-wing populism | National Assembly: 39 / 400 NCOP: 10 / 90 | Member of the non-ruling Progressive Caucus |
| South Africa | | Socialist Revolutionary Workers Party | SRWP | Irvin Jim | March 2019 | Marxism-Leninism | National Assembly: 0 / 400 NCOP: 0 / 90 | |
| South Korea | | People's Democracy Party 민중민주당 | | Lee Sang-hoon | 2016 | Korean reunification Korean nationalism Anti-militarism | National Assembly: 0 / 300 | |
| South Ossetia | | Communist Party of South Ossetia; Хуссар Ирыстоны Коммунистон парти | CPSO; ХИКп | Stanislav Kochiev | 1993 | Marxism–Leninism; Soviet patriotism | Parliament: 1 / 34 | |
| South Sudan | | Communist Party of South Sudan | CPSS | Joseph Wol Modesto | June 2011 | Marxism–Leninism | Legislative Assembly: 0 / 400 Council of States: 0 / 100 | |
| Spain | | Communist Party of Spain (Marxist–Leninist); Partido Comunista de España (marxista-leninista) | PCE (M–L) | | 2006 | Marxism–Leninism; Stalinism; Hoxhaism; Anti-revisionism; Republicanism | Congress of Deputies: 0 / 350 Senate: 0 / 263 | |
| Spain | | Communist Party of the Peoples of Spain; Partido Comunista de los Pueblos de España | PCPE | Julio Díaz | 15 January 1984 | Marxism–Leninism; Hard Euroscepticism; Internationalism | Congress of Deputies: 0 / 350 Senate: 0 / 263 | |
| Spain | | Communist Unification of Spain; Unificación Comunista de España | UCE | | 1973 | Marxism–Leninism; Maoism | Congress of Deputies: 0 / 350 Senate: 0 / 263 | |
| Spain | | Democratic Labour Party; Partido del Trabajo Democrático | PTD | Miguel Ángel Villalón | 2013 | Marxism–Leninism; Republicanism; Feminism | Congress of Deputies: 0 / 350 Senate: 0 / 263 | |
| Spain | | Marxist–Leninist Front of the Peoples of Spain; Frente Marxista-Leninista de los Pueblos de España | F(M-L)PE | Gregorio Fernandez Lopez | 1987 | Marxism–Leninism | Congress of Deputies: 0 / 350 Senate: 0 / 263 | |
| Spain | | Marxist–Leninist Party (Communist Reconstruction); Partido Marxista–Leninista (Reconstrucción Comunista) | PML(RC) / RC | Roberto Vaquero Arribas | 6 October 2014 | Marxism–Leninism; Anti-revisionism; Republicanism; Proletarian internationalism | Congress of Deputies: 0 / 350 Senate: 0 / 263 | Temporarily banned from December 2014 to 2017 due to alleged links to the PKK. |
| Spain | | Revolutionary Communist Party; Partido Comunista Revolucionario | PCR | | 1994 | Marxism–Leninism–Maoism; Anti-revisionism; Maoism | Congress of Deputies: 0 / 350 Senate: 0 / 263 | |
| Spain | | Spanish Communist Workers' Party; Partido Comunista Obrero Español | PCOE | Francisco Barjas | 1973 | Marxism–Leninism; Stalinism; Anti-revisionism; Republicanism | Congress of Deputies: 0 / 350 Senate: 0 / 263 | |
| Spain | | Communist Party of Spain (Reconstituted); Partido Comunista de España (Reconstituido) | PCE(r) | Manuel Pérez Martínez | 1975 | Marxism–Leninism; Republicanism; Maoism (until 1990s) | Banned | Banned in 2003 due to links to the First of October Anti-Fascist Resistance Groups. Inactive as of 2006; not officially dissolved. |
| Spain | | Forward–Socialist Organisation of National Liberation; Endavant–Organització Socialista d'Alliberament Nacional | Endavant | | 2000 | Marxism; Catalan independence Catalan Countries; Socialist feminism Euroscepticism | Parliament of Catalonia: 2 / 135 | Member of the Popular Unity Candidacy |
| Spain | | Living Unified Socialist Party of Catalonia; Partit Socialista Unificat de Catalunya Viu; Partido Socialista Unificado de Cataluña Vivo | PSUC Viu | Collective leadership | June 1997 | Republicanism; Federalism | Parliament of Catalonia: 0 / 135 | Regional party active in Catalonia |
| Spain | | United and Alternative Left; Esquerra Unida i Alternativa; Izquierda Unida y Alternativa | EUiA | Joan Josep Nuet | 1998 | Marxism; Catalan self-determination Republicanism | Parliament of Catalonia: 0 / 135 | Regional party active in Catalonia |
| Spain | | Galician People's Union; Unión do Povo Galego; Unión del Pueblo Gallego | UPG | Néstor Rego | November 1963 | Marxism-Leninism; Galician nationalism | Parliament of Galicia: 4 / 75 | Regional party active in Galicia. Member of the Galician Nationalist Bloc. |
| Spain | | Galician Movement for Socialism; Movemento Galego ao Socialismo; Movimiento Gallego al Socialismo | MGS | Rafa Villar | 2009 | Galician nationalism Galician self-determination Euroscepticism; Feminism | Parliament of Galicia: 1 / 75 | Regional party active in Galicia. Member of the Galician Nationalist Bloc. |
| Spain | | Galician People's Front; Frente Popular Galega; Frente Popular Gallego | FPG | Mariano Abalo | 1986 | Marxism-Leninism; Galician self-determination | Parliament of Galicia: 0 / 75 | Regional party active in Galicia |
| Sri Lanka | | Ceylon Communist Party (Maoist) ලංකා කොමියුනිස්ට් පක්ෂය (මාඕවාදී) சிலோன் கம்யூனிஸ்ட் கட்சி (மாவோயிஸ்ட்) | CCP (Maoist) | | 1964 | Marxism–Leninism; Maoism; Anti-revisionism | Parliament: 0 / 225 | |
| Sri Lanka | | Communist Party of Sri Lanka ශ්‍රී ලංකාවේ කොමියුනිස්ට් පක්ෂය இலங்கை கம்யூனிஸ்ட் கட்சி | CPSL ශ්‍රීලංකොප இ.க.க. | G. Weerasinghe | 1943 | Marxism–Leninism | Parliament: 0 / 225 | Part of various different coalition governments from 1970–1975, 1994–2000, 2004–2015 and 2020–2022 |
| Sri Lanka | | Frontline Socialist Party පෙරටුගාමී සමාජවාදී පක්ෂය முன்னிலை சோசலிசக் கட்சி | FLSP පෙසප மு.சோ.க. | Premakumar Gunaratnam | 9 April 2012 | Marxism-Leninism; Revolutionary socialism | Parliament: 0 / 225 | |
| Sri Lanka | | Lanka Sama Samaja Party ලංකා සම සමාජ පක්ෂය லங்கா சமசமாஜக் கட்சி | LSSP ලසසප ல.ச.ச.க. | Tissa Vitharana | 18 December 1935 | Trotskyism | Parliament: 0 / 225 | Part of various different coalition governments from 1970–1975, 1994–2000, 2004–2015 and 2020–2022 |
| Sri Lanka | | New Democratic Marxist–Leninist Party නව-ප්‍රජාතන්ත්‍රවාදී මාක්ස්-ලෙනින්වාදී පක්ෂය புதிய-ஜனநாயக மார்க்சிச-லெனினிச கட்சி | NDMLP නප්‍රමාලෙප பு.ஜ.மா.லெ.க. | S. K. Senthivel | 3 July 1978 | Marxism-Leninism; Maoism; Anti-revisionism | Parliament: 0 / 225 | |
| Sri Lanka | | Socialist Equality Party සමාජවාදී සමානතා පක්ෂය சோசலிச சமத்துவக் கட்சி | SEP සසප சோ.ச.க. | Deepal Jayasekera | 1964 | Trotskyism | Parliament: 0 / 225 | |
| Sri Lanka | | Socialist Party of Sri Lanka ශ්‍රී ලංකා සමාජවාදී පක්ෂය இலங்கை சோசலிச கட்சி | SPSL | | 2006 | Marxism; Trotskyism | Parliament: 0 / 225 | |
| Sri Lanka | | United Socialist Party එක්සත් සමාජවාදි පකෂය ஐக்கிய சோசலிச கட்சி | USP එසප ஐ.சோ.க. | Siritunga Jayasuriya | 2006 | Marxism; Trotskyism | Parliament: 0 / 225 | |
| Sudan | | Sudanese Communist Party | SCP | Muhammad Mukhtar Al-Khatib | 1946 | Marxism–Leninism | Transitional Legislative Council: 0 / 300 | |
| Sweden | | Communist Party; Kommunistiska partiet | K | Povel Johansson | 1970 | Marxism–Leninism; Anti-revisionism | Riksdag: 0 / 349 | |
| Sweden | | Communist Party of Sweden; Sveriges Kommunistiska Parti | SKP | Andreas Sörensen | 1977 | Marxism–Leninism; Hard Euroscepticism | Riksdag: 0 / 349 | |
| Switzerland | | Swiss Party of Labour; Partei der Arbeit der Schweiz; Parti Suisse du Travail – Parti Ouvrier et Populaire; Partito Svizzero del Lavoro – Partito Operaio e Popolare | PdA; PST-POP; PdL-POP | Norberto Crivelli | 14 October 1944 | Marxism; Socialism | National Council: 1 / 200 Council of States: 0 / 46 | |
| Switzerland | | Communist Party; Partito Comunista | PC | Massimiliano Arif Ay | May 1944 | Marxism–Leninism | National Council: 0 / 200 Council of States: 0 / 46 | Currently only active in Ticino and the Grisons |
| Syria | | People's Will Party حزب الإرادة الشعبية | PWP | Collective leadership | 2012 | Marxism-Leninism | People's Assembly: 0 / 250 | |
| Syria | | Syrian Revolutionary Left Current تيار اليسار الثوري في سوريا | SRLC | Ghayath Naisse | October 2011 | Revolutionary socialism | People's Assembly: 0 / 250 | |
| Syria | | Arab Communist Party الحزب الشيوعي العربي | ACP | Collective leadership | February 1968 | Marxism-Leninism | Banned | |
| Syria | | Communist Action Party حزب العمل الشيوعي | CAP | Fateh Jamous | August 1976 | Marxism-Leninism | Banned | |
| Syria | | Syrian Communist Party (Bakdash) الحزب الشيوعي السوري | SCP(B) | Ammar Bakdash | July 1986 | Marxism-Leninism | Banned | |
| Syria | | Syrian Communist Party (Unified) الحزب الشيوعي السوري (الموحد) | SCP(U) | Yusuf Faisal | January 1987 | Marxism-Leninism | Banned | |
| Taiwan | | Taiwan People's Communist Party 臺灣人民共產黨 | TPCP | Lin Te-wang | 4 February 2017 | Chinese unification Socialism with Chinese characteristics | Legislative Yuan: 0 / 113 | |
| Tajikistan | | Communist Party of Tajikistan | KPT | | 6 December 1924 | Marxism–Leninism; Soviet patriotism | | |
| Timor-Leste | | Socialist Party of Timor; Partido Socialista de Timor | PST | Avelino Coelho da Silva | 11 February 1997 | Marxism–Leninism | National Parliament: 0 / 65 | |
| Togo | | Communist Party of Togo | PCT | | 4 May 1980 | Hoxhaism; Marxism-Leninism; Anti-revisionism | | |
| Transnistria | | Transnistrian Communist Party; Приднестровская коммунистическая партия | PKP; ПКП | Nadezhda Bondarenko | 20 April 2003 | Marxism–Leninism; Soviet patriotism | | |
| Tunisia | | Democratic Patriots' Unified Party | | Ziad Lakhdar | 1982 | Marxism-Leninism Anti-revisionism Maoism Arab nationalism Anti-Islamism | | |
| Tunisia | | Workers' Party | | Hamma Hammami | January 3, 1986 | Marxism-Leninism; Hoxhaism; Pan-Arabism | | |
| Turkey | | Workers' Party of Turkey | TİP | Erkan Baş | 7 November 2001 | Marxism–Leninism; Left-wing populism Progressivism | Parliament: 4 / 600 | |
| Turkey | | Labour Party | EMEP | Selma Gürkan | 25 November 1996 | Marxism–Leninism; Hoxhaism; Anti-revisionism | Parliament: 2 / 600 | |
| Turkey | | Communist Party of Turkey | TKP | Kemal Okuyan | 11 November 2001 | Marxism–Leninism | Parliament: 0 / 600 | |
| Turkey | | Bolshevik Party (North Kurdistan – Turkey) | BP (KK-T) | | 1981 | Marxism-Leninism; Anti-revisionism | Banned | |
| Turkey | | Communist Labour Party of Turkey/Leninist | TKEP/L | | 1 September 1990 | Marxism–Leninism | Banned | |
| Turkey | | Communist Party of Kurdistan | KKP | | 1982 | Kurdish self-determination | Banned | |
| Turkey | | Communist Party of Turkey/Marxist–Leninist | TKP/ML | | 24 April 1972 | Marxism–Leninism–Maoism | Banned | |
| Turkey | | Communist Workers Party of Turkey | TKİP | | November 1998 | Marxism-Leninism | Banned | |
| Turkey | | Maoist Communist Party | MKP | | 15 September 2002 | Marxism–Leninism–Maoism | Banned | |
| Turkey | | Marxist–Leninist Communist Party | MLKP | | 10 September 1994 | Marxism–Leninism; Anti-revisionism; Hoxhaism | Banned | |
| Turkey | | Revolutionary People's Liberation Party/Front | DHKP/C | | 30 March 1994 | Marxism-Leninism; Guevarism; Foco theory Socialist patriotism Revolutionary socialism | Banned | |
| Turkmenistan | | Communist Party of Turkmenistan | TKP | | 1998 | Marxism–Leninism; Soviet patriotism | | |
| Ukraine | | Communist Party of Ukraine; Комуністична партія України; Коммунистическая партия Украины | KPU; КПУ | Petro Symonenko | 19 June 1993 | Marxism–Leninism; Left-wing populism Soviet patriotism Pro-Russia; Social conservatism | Banned in 2015 under Ukraine's decommunization laws, continues to operate underground | |
| Ukraine | | Union of Communists of Ukraine; Союз комуністів України; Союз коммунистов Украины | SKU; СКУ | | December 19, 1992 | Marxism–Leninism; Anti-revisionism; Stalinism | Banned in 2015 under Ukraine's decommunization laws, continues to operate underground | |
| United Kingdom | | Communist League | | | 1998 | Fidelismo | | |
| United Kingdom | | Communist Party of Britain | CPB | Robert Griffiths | 1988 | Marxism–Leninism; Britain's Road to Socialism | | |
| United Kingdom | | Communist Party of Britain (Marxist–Leninist) | CPB-ML | | 1968 | Marxism-Leninism; Hard Euroscepticism; Hoxhaism; Maoism (until 1979) | | |
| United Kingdom | | Communist Party of Great Britain (Marxist–Leninist) | CPGB-ML | Ella Rule | July 3, 2004 | Marxism-Leninism; Stalinism; Anti-revisionism; Hard Euroscepticism | | |
| United Kingdom | | Communist Party of Great Britain (Provisional Central Committee) | CPGB (PCC) | | 1991 | Leninism; Anti-Stalinism | | |
| United Kingdom | | New Communist Party of Britain | NCP | Andy Brooks | 1977 | Marxism-Leninism; Stalinism; Anti-revisionism; Hard Euroscepticism | | |
| United Kingdom | | Revolutionary Communist Group | RCG | | 1974 | Marxism-Leninism | | |
| United Kingdom | | Revolutionary Communist Party of Britain (Marxist–Leninist) | CPE (ML) | | 1979 | Marxism-Leninism; Hoxhaism; Anti-revisionism | | |
| United Kingdom | | Socialist Workers Party | SWP | Alex Callinicos and Lewis Nielsen | 1977 | Trotskyism Cliffism Revolutionary socialism | | |
| United Kingdom | | Workers Revolutionary Party | WRP | Joshua Ogunley | 1959 | Trotskyism | | |
| United States | | American Communist Party | ACP | Haz Al-Din | 21 July 2024 | Marxism-Leninism | House: 0 / 435 Senate: 0 / 100 | |
| United States | | Communist Party USA | CPUSA | Joe Sims; Rossana Cambron | 1 September 1919 | Democratic Socialism Marxism-Leninism; Bill of Rights socialism | House: 0 / 435 Senate: 0 / 100 | |
| United States | | Party for Socialism and Liberation | PSL | Collective leadership | June 2004 | Marxism–Leninism; Revolutionary socialism | House: 0 / 435 Senate: 0 / 100 | |
| United States | | Revolutionary Communists of America | RCA | Collective leadership | 2024 | Trotskyism | House: 0 / 435 Senate: 0 / 100 | |
| United States | | Socialist Action | | Jeff Mackler | 1983 | Trotskyism | House: 0 / 435 Senate: 0 / 100 | |
| United States | | Socialist Alternative | SA | Collective leadership | April 1986 | Marxism; Revolutionary socialism Trotskyism | House: 0 / 435 Senate: 0 / 100 | |
| United States | | Socialist Equality Party | SEP | David North | September 1964 | Revolutionary socialism Trotskyism | House: 0 / 435 Senate: 0 / 100 | |
| United States | | Socialist Workers Party | SWP | Jack Barnes | January 1938 | Marxism; Castroism Zionism | House: 0 / 435 Senate: 0 / 100 | |
| United States | | Workers World Party | WWP | Larry Holmes | 1959 | Marxism-Leninism; Proletarian internationalism | House: 0 / 435 Senate: 0 / 100 | |
| Uruguay | | Revolutionary Communist Party of Uruguay; Partido Comunista Revolucionario | PCR | Ricardo Cohen | 1972 | Marxism–Leninism–Maoism | Chamber of Representatives: 0 / 99 Senate: 0 / 30 | |
| Uzbekistan | | Communist Party of Uzbekistan; Ўзбекистон коммунистик партияси / Oʻzbekiston kommunistik partiyasi Коммунистическая партия Узбекистана | КПУз / OʻzKP; СДК | Kaxramon Mahmudov | 1994 | Marxism–Leninism; Socialism; Soviet patriotism Anti-clericalism | Banned | Banned immediately after attempting to register with Uzbekistan's Central Election Commission |
| Venezuela | | Communist Party of Venezuela; Partido Comunista de Venezuela | PCV | Óscar Figuera | 5 March 1931 | Marxism–Leninism | National Assembly: 1 / 277 | |
| Venezuela | | Marxist–Leninist Communist Party of Venezuela; Partido Comunista Marxista Leninista de Venezuela | PCMLV | | 2009 | Marxism–Leninism; Stalinism; Hoxhaism; Anti-revisionism; Anti-Chavismo | National Assembly: 0 / 277 | |
| Venezuela | | Red Flag Party; Partido Bandera Roja | BR | Gabriel Puerta Aponte | 20 January 1970 | Marxism–Leninism; Anti-revisionism; Anti-Chavismo | National Assembly: 0 / 277 | |
| Venezuela | | Revolutionary Movement Tupamaro (Popular Revolutionary Alternative); Movimiento Revolucionario Tupamaro | MRT | | 1992 | Marxism-Leninism; Guevarism; Foco theory Left-wing nationalism Revolutionary socialism | National Assembly: 0 / 277 | Section of the party supporting the APR |

- All-Union Communist Party, All-Union Communist Party (Bolsheviks), Communist Party of the Soviet Union, Bolshevik Platform of the KPSS[17]

== Formerly communist ==
| Country | Before | Turned (Note: Ideologically transformed parties which are currently in power) | Notes |
|---|---|---|---|
| Angola | People's Movement for the Liberation of Angola | same name | Has abandoned Marxist-Leninism for social democracy |
| Angola | National Union for the Total Independence of Angola | same name | Abandoned Marxism-Leninism for social democracy and then for social conservatism |
| Brazil | Popular Socialist Party | Cidadania | Has abandoned Marxism-Leninism for social democracy and later social liberalism |
| Bulgaria | Bulgarian Communist Party | Bulgarian Socialist Party | Has abandoned Marxism-Leninism for social democracy |
| Cambodia | Kampuchean Revolutionary People's Party | Cambodian People's Party | Has abandoned Marxism-Leninism for centrism |
| Comoros | Democratic Rally of the Comorian People | same name | Has abandoned Marxism-Leninism for social democracy |
| Congo | Congolese Party of Labour | same name | Has abandoned Marxism-Leninism for social democracy |
| Croatia | League of Communists of Croatia | Social Democratic Party | Has abandoned Marxism-Leninism-Titoism for social democracy |
| Kazakhstan | Communist People's Party of Kazakhstan | People's Party of Kazakhstan | Has abandoned Marxism-Leninism for democratic socialism |
| Mongolia | Mongolian People's Revolutionary Party | Mongolian People's Party | Has abandoned Marxist-Leninism for social democracy |
| Montenegro | League of Communists of Montenegro | Democratic Party of Socialists of Montenegro | Has abandoned Marxism-Leninism-Titoism for social democracy and later neoliberalism |
| Morocco | Party of Progress and Socialism | same name | Has abandoned Marxism-Leninism for democratic socialism |
| Mozambique | FRELIMO | same name | Has abandoned Marxism-Leninism for democratic socialism |
| Serbia | League of Communists of Serbia | Socialist Party of Serbia | Has abandoned Marxism-Leninism-Titoism for social democracy |
| Slovenia | League of Communists of Slovenia | Social Democrats | Has abandoned Marxism-Leninism-Titoism for social democracy |
| Sweden | Left Party – the Communists; Vänsterpartiet kommunisterna | Left Party; Vänsterpartiet | Has abandoned Marxism-Leninism for socialism |
| Yemen | Yemeni Socialist Party | same name | Has abandoned Marxism-Leninism for social democracy |

== Defunct ==
=== Once ruling ===
| State | Defunct Party | Notes |
|---|---|---|
| Afghanistan | People's Democratic Party of Afghanistan | |
| Albania | Party of Labour of Albania | Succeeded by Socialist Party of Albania |
| Benin | People's Revolutionary Party of Benin | |
| Bulgaria | Bulgarian Communist Party | Succeeded by the Bulgarian Socialist Party |
| Cambodia | Communist Party of Kampuchea | |
| Czechoslovakia | Communist Party of Czechoslovakia | Czech Republic branch became the Communist Party of Bohemia and Moravia, and the Slovak branch became the Party of the Democratic Left |
| Ethiopia | Workers' Party of Ethiopia | |
| Germany | Socialist Unity Party | |
| Grenada | New Jewel Movement | |
| Hungary | Hungarian Working People's Party | |
| Hungary | Hungarian Socialist Workers' Party | Became the Hungarian Socialist Party |
| Poland | Polish United Workers' Party | |
| Romania | Romanian Communist Party | |
| Somalia | Somali Revolutionary Socialist Party | |
| Soviet Union | Communist Party of the Soviet Union | Formerly the Bolshevik faction of the Russian Social Democratic Labor Party |
| Yugoslavia | League of Communists of Yugoslavia | |

=== Non-ruling ===
- Armenia – Armenian Workers Communist Party, Armenian Workers Union, Marxist Party of Armenia, Union of Communists of Armenia, Renewed Communist Party of Armenia
- Australia – Communist Party of Australia
- Barbados – Workers Party of Barbados
- (Basque Country (autonomous community)) Basque Country – Auzolan, Communist Movement of Euskadi, Communist Party of the Basque Homelands, Euskadiko Sozialisten Batasuna, Euskal Herriko Alderdi Sozialista, Euskal Iraultzarako Alderdia, Eusko Alderdi Sozialista, Herriko Alderdi Sozialista, Navarrese Left Union, Party of the Revolutionary Patriotic Workers, People's Socialist Revolutionary Party
- Belgium – Union of Marxist–Leninist Communists of Belgium, founded in 1970
- Belgium – Communist Party of Belgium – Marxist–Leninist, founded in 1976.
- Brazil – Free Fatherland Party
- Bulgaria – Bulgarian Communist Party – Marxists
- Burkina Faso – African Independence Party (Burkina Faso), Burkinabé Bolshevik Party, Burkinabé Communist Group, Marxist–Leninist Group, Organization for Popular Democracy – Labour Movement, Party for Democracy and Socialism, Party of Labour of Burkina, Patriotic League for Development, Union of Burkinabé Communists, Union of Communist Struggles, Union of Communist Struggles – Reconstructed, Union of Communist Struggles – The Flame, Voltaic Communist Organization
- Catalonia – Catalan Communist Party, Catalan-Balear Communist Federation, Workers and Peasants' Bloc, Catalan State-Proletarian Party, Unified Socialist Party of Catalonia, Socialist Party of National Liberation-Provisional, Party of the Communists of Catalonia
- Canada – Labor-Progressive Party (legal front of the Communist Party of Canada from 1943 to 1959), Workers' Communist Party of Canada
- Channel Islands – Jersey Communist Party
- Chile – Chilean Communist Party (Proletarian Action), Revolutionary Left Movement
- Colombia – Workers Revolutionary Party of Colombia, Colombian Communist Party (merged into Historic Pact)
- Costa Rica – Costa Rican People's Party
- Cyprus – Communist Party of Cyprus
- Cuba – Popular Socialist Party, joined Cuban Communist Party
- El Salvador – Communist Party of El Salvador, merged into the FMLN
- Eswatini – Swaziland Communist Party
- Gambia – Gambia Socialist Revolutionary Party
- Georgia – Revived Communist Party of Georgia, Georgian Workers Communist Party, Communist Party of Georgia, New Communist Party of Georgia
- Germany – Spartacist League formed in 1918 and became the Communist Party of Germany
- West Germany – Socialist Unity Party of West Berlin, Communist Party of Germany (banned 1956 in West Germany)
- Guatemala – Guatemalan Party of Labour, merged into the URNG
- Haiti – Haitian Communist Party, Haitian Workers Party, Unified Party of Haitian Communists, merged into the National Reconstruction Movement in 1990
- Honduras – Communist Party of Honduras, merged into the Patriotic Renewal Party
- Iceland – Communist Party of Iceland, Communist Party of Iceland (Marxist–Leninist)
- India – Indian Communist Party
- Indonesia – Communist Party of Indonesia
- Ireland – Communist Party of Ireland (Marxist–Leninist)
- Iraq – Leninist Group in the Iraqi Communist Movement
- Israel – Maki (1948–1973) split in 1965 with formation of largely Arab Rakah which changed its name to Maki in 1989
- Italy – Communist Party of Italy, Italian Communist Party of the Julian March, Marxist–Leninist Italian Communist Party, Marxist–Leninist Revolutionary Party of Italy, Movement for Peace and Socialism, Movement for the Confederation of the Communists
- Lebanon – Lebanese People's Party
- Malaysia – Malayan Communist Party, North Kalimantan Communist Party
- Mexico – Mexican Communist Party
- Moldova – Communist Reformers Party of Moldova
- Myanmar – Communist Party (Burma)
- Namibia – Communist Party of Namibia
- New Caledonia – Communist Party of New Caledonia
- Netherlands – Communist Party of the Netherlands merged into the GroenLinks in 1989, marxist-leninist dissidents within the party formed the NCPN in 1992.
- New Zealand – Communist Party of New Zealand, Socialist Unity Party
- Nigeria – Nigerian Communist Party, Socialist Workers and Farmers Party of Nigeria
- North Korea – Workers' Party of North Korea
- Norway – Workers' Communist Party merged into the Red Party
- Palestine – Communist Party of Palestine (1921–1948)
- Poland – Communist Party of Poland
- Saudi Arabia – Communist Party in Saudi Arabia
- South Korea – Workers' Party of South Korea
- Switzerland – Party of Labour Basel, founded in 1944
- Syria - Syrian Communist Party, Syrian Communist Party (Unified), Syrian Communist Party (Bakdash)
- Taiwan – Taiwanese Communist Party, China Communist Alliance, Communist Party of the Republic of China, Taiwan Democratic Communist Party
- Tatarstan – Communist Party of the Republic of Tatarstan
- Thailand – Communist Party of Thailand
- Transnistria (unrecognized country) – Communist Party of Transnistria
- Trieste – Communist Party of the Free Territory of Trieste, merged into the Italian Communist Party
- Trinidad and Tobago – Communist Party of Trinidad and Tobago
- Turkey – Communist Party of Turkey (1920-1988), Workers' Party of Turkey (1961-1971, 1975-1980), United Communist Party of Turkey, Labour Party of Turkey, People's Liberation Party-Front of Turkey, Communist Labour Party of Turkey, Revolutionary Workers' and Peasants' Party of Turkey, Revolutionary Communist Party of Turkey, TKP/ML Hareketi, TKP/ML New Build-Up Organization
- United Kingdom – Communist Party of Great Britain, Communist Party of Scotland
- United States – Communist Party Marxist–Leninist, May 19th Communist Movement, Communist Workers Party, Black Panther Party, Communist Labor Party of America, International Socialist Organization

== Left communist organizations by country ==
The following is a list of left communist organizations by country which list only those political organizations and parties who officially call themselves left communist ideologically and still exist.

| Country | Organizations |
|---|---|
Ideologically left communist organizations
| Italy | International Communist Party; Lotta Comunista |
| Iran | Internationalist Voice |
| United Kingdom | Communist Workers' Organisation |
| United States | International Communist Party; Internationalism; Internationalist Workers Group; Workers Offensive |

== See also ==
- List of communist parties represented in European Parliament
- List of socialist parties with national parliamentary representation
- List of social democratic parties
- List of democratic socialist parties and organizations
- List of left-wing political parties
