= Communist Party of Armenia =

Communist Party of Armenia may refer to:

== Party prior to Soviet era ==
- Armenian Communist Party, established in 1917 in Caucasus as a liberation movement of Western Armenia

== Party in Soviet era ==
- Communist Party of Armenia (Soviet Union), established in 1920 and ruling Soviet Armenia from 1920 to 1990, and dissolved forming Armenian Democratic Party instead

== Parties in the Republic of Armenia era ==
- Armenian Communist Party, established 1991 (leader Rouben Tovmasyan)
- United Communist Party of Armenia, established 2003 (leader Yuri Manukyan) formed from union and merger of:
  - Marxist Party of Armenia, active independently from 1997 to 2003
  - Renewed Communist Party of Armenia, active independently 2002-2003 before merging
  - Union of Communists of Armenia
- Progressive United Communist Party of Armenia (leader Vazgen Safaryan)

== See also ==
- Democratic Party of Armenia, democratic socialist party established in 1991 by Aram Gaspar Sargsyan, the last secretary of the Soviet-era Communust Party of Armenia and made up of former Armenian communists with Sargsyan dissolving the party and declaring the change of name with the establishment of the independent Republic of Armenia
