= Ex-communist =

Ex-communist can refer to:

- Post-Communism, the period of political and economic transition in former communist states located in parts of Europe and Asia
- formerly communist political parties in non-communist states that have changed name to omit the word communist, and/or have changed ideology to move away from communism; see List_of_communist_parties#Former
- a person who formerly adhered to communist ideology; see Communism
- Anti communism#Former communists
