= Marxism–Leninism–Maoism–Prachanda Path =

Ideology developed by the Unified Communist Party of Nepal (Maoist)

Marxism–Leninism–Maoism–Prachanda Path (Nepali: मालेमावाद र प्रचण्डपथ Mālemāvād ra Prachaṇḍapath; sometimes shortened to Prachanda Path) is the ideological line of the Communist Party of Nepal (Maoist Centre), also known as the CPN (MC). It is considered a development of Marxism–Leninism–Maoism (MLM) and named after the leader of the CPN (MC), Pushpa Kamal Dahal, commonly known as Prachanda. Prachanda Path was proclaimed in 2001. The ideology was partially inspired by the example of the Communist Party of Peru – Shining Path, which refers to its ideological line as Marxism–Leninism–Maoism–Gonzalo Thought.

Prachanda Path does not claim to make an ideological break with Marxism, Leninism or Maoism, but rather to be an extension of these ideologies based on the politics of Nepal. The doctrine came into existence after the party determined that the ideologies of Marxism, Leninism and Maoism could no longer be practiced completely as they had been in the past. The party adopted Prachanda Path as they felt it was a suitable ideology based on the reality of Nepalese politics. Militarily and in the context of the 1996–2006 civil war in Nepal, central to the ideology was the achievement of revolution through the control of rural areas and the encirclement of urban settlements.

The CPN (MC) was seen to have abandoned Maoism in its decision to merge with the Communist Party of Nepal (Unified Marxist–Leninist) to form the Nepal Communist Party, but this party has since been disestablished and the CPN (MC) reconstituted.

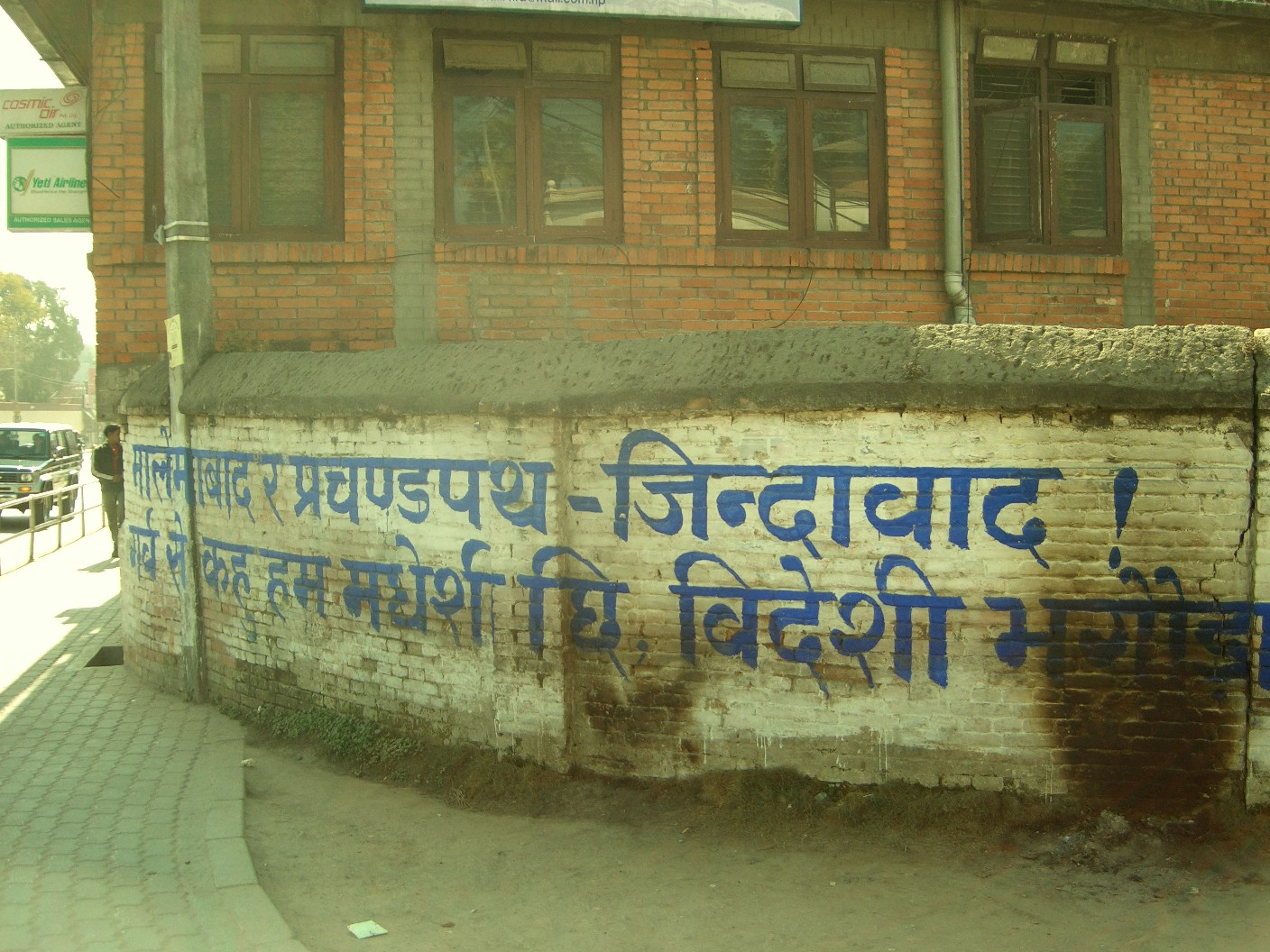
Mural in Kathmandu with the slogan "Long Live Marxism–Leninism–Maoism–Prachanda Path"

== See also ==
- People's Liberation Army, Nepal
- People's Multiparty Democracy
