= Communist Party of South Sudan =

Political party in South Sudan

Communist Party of South Sudan حزب الشيوعي جنوب السودان
- General Secretary: Joseph Wol Modesto
- Founded: June 2011
- Split from: SCP
- Headquarters: Juba
- Ideology: Communism; Marxism–Leninism
- Political position: Far-left

The Communist Party of South Sudan (Arabic: حزب الشيوعي جنوب السودان, Hizb Al-Shuyu'i Janub Al-Sudan) is a Marxist-Leninist party in South Sudan. It was formed in June 2011, as the southern branches of the Sudanese Communist Party separated themselves from their mother party ahead of South Sudanese independence. The formation of the new party was declared at a meeting at the Sudanese Communist Party office in Khartoum. Joseph Wol Modesto is the general secretary of the party.

The party participated in the 2013 International Communist Seminar in Brussels.

== See also ==
- Sudanese Communist Party
