= Party of the Angolan Communist Community =

Political party in Angola

Party of the Angolan Communist Community Partido da Comunidade Comunista Angolana
- Chairman: Baptista André José Simão
- Founded: 1994
- Ideology: Communism; Marxism-Leninism
- Political position: Far-left

Party of the Angolan Communist Community (Portuguese: Partido da Comunidade Comunista Angolana) was a Marxist-Leninist political party in Angola. Baptista André José Simão was the chairman of the party.

The party was registered at the Supreme Court in 1994. Ahead of the 2008 parliamentary election, the party was not allowed to participate as it failed to obtain the necessary 5 000 voters signatures. The party presented 4,573 signatures, out of which 1,846 were deemed correct according to the Constitutional Court. The party forms part of the 'Group of Seven', a grouping of parties which either had their candidacies rejected or never attempted to put candidates in the election. The grouping supported the ruling People's Movement for the Liberation of Angola (MPLA) in the 2008 election.
