= United Communist Party of Armenia =

United Communist Party of Armenia Հայաստանի Միավորված Կոմունիստական Կուսակցության
- Leader: Yuri Manoukian
- Founded: July 7, 2003
- Merger of: Marxist Party of Armenia; Union of Communists of Armenia; Renewed Communist Party of Armenia; Armenian Workers Communist Party; Armenian Workers Union
- Headquarters: Yerevan
- Ideology: Communism; Marxism–Leninism; Euroscepticism
- Political position: Far-left
- Continental affiliation: CPSU (2001)

The United Communist Party of Armenia (Armenian: Հայաստանի Միավորված Կոմունիստական Կուսակցության, abbreviated Armenian: ՀՄԿԿ / HMKK, Hayastani Miatsial Komunistakan Kusaktsutyun) is a Marxist-Leninist party in Armenia. It was formed on July 7, 2003 through the merger of:

- Renewed Communist Party of Armenia – (in Armenian: Հայաստանի նորացված կոմունիստական կուսակցություն, romanized: Hayastani Noratsvats Komunistakan Kusaktsutyun) abbreviated HNKK, formed on May 25, 2002, by former Armenian Communist Party (HKK) leaders Yuri Manukian and Grant Voskanyan who had been expelled from HKK the previous year on the grounds that they had advocated cooperation with the government. Manukian became the First Secretary of the Central Committee of the United Communist Party of Armenia
- Armenian Workers Communist Party – (in Armenian: Հայաստանի աշխատավորության կոմունիստական կուսակցություն, romanized: Hayastani Ashkhatavorutian Komunistakan Kusaktsutiun)
- Armenian Workers Union – (in Armenian: Հայ աշխատավորների միություն) founded in 1999.
- Union of Communists of Armenia – (in Armenian: Հայաստանի կոմունիստների միություն). In the 2003 elections, the party formed part of the Free and Fair Armenia electoral bloc before joining the United Communist Party of Armenia.
- Marxist Party of Armenia – (in Armenian: Հայաստանի մարքսիստական կուսակցություն) The Marxist Party of Armenia had registered in 1997, but failed to get re-registered by 1 January 2001. In the 2003 elections, the party formed part of the Free and Fair Armenia electoral bloc before joining the United Communist Party of Armenia.
- Party of Intellectuals.

The HMKK held its first congress on March 25, 2004. Yuri Manoukian was elected First Secretary of the party. The meeting saw the election of a 77-member Central Committee and a 17-member Politburo.

The HMKK considers itself as a "constructive opposition party". It has closer links to the government than the main Armenian Communist Party and does not join opposition fronts.

The HMKK extended its support to the successful presidential bid of Defense Minister Serzh Sargsyan.

== See also ==
- Armenian Communist Party
- Communist Party of Armenia (disambiguation)
- Communist Party of Armenia (Soviet Union)
- Politics of Armenia
- Programs of political parties in Armenia
