= Joseph Wol Modesto =

Joseph Wol Modesto Ukelo is a South Sudanese politician. As of 2011, he is the general secretary of the South Sudan Communist Party.

In 1989 he was appointed Minister of Education in the Southern Council. He contested the 2010 South Sudan Legislative Assembly election, from the Wau North Payam constituency as a candidate of the Sudanese Communist Party. He finished in second place, with 4,701 votes (16.4%). Before South Sudanese independence he was a member of the Central Committee of the Sudanese Communist Party, being in-charge of the Southern Bureau of the party.
