= People's Multiparty Democracy =

Communist political system

People's Multiparty Democracy (जनताको बहुदलिय जनबाद, abbreviated जबज) refers to the ideological line of the Communist Party of Nepal (Unified Marxist–Leninist) (CPN-UML), Unified Socialist Party and the former Nepal Communist Party. It was proclaimed in 1993. The idea puts forth a representative democratic multi-party system, in order to build up the means of production for the development of Socialism. It is considered an extension of Marxism–Leninism by Madan Bhandari, the CPN-UML leader who developed it, and is based on the home-ground politics of Nepal.

During the merger of CPN(UML) and the Unified Communist Party of Nepal (Maoist Centre) into the Nepal Communist Party, the party line of the united party was provisionally defined as 'People's Democracy' as a compromise between the People's Multiparty Democracy line of the erstwhile CPN(UML) and the '21st Century Democracy' line of the erstwhile UCPN(M). The Nepal Communist Party was later dissolved due to a court ruling.

Similarly, multiple political parties are supported by the Chinese Communist Party, though in contrast to Nepal's current system of multi-party democracy, the eight minor Chinese parties are only consultative and are completely subservient to the main party, which is guaranteed control of government by the Constitution of China, thus precluding any kind of free electoral system such as exists in Nepal.

== See also ==
- Marxism–Leninism–Maoism–Prachanda Path
