= Revolutionary Party of the Proletariat – Bases for Revolution =

Revolutionary Party of the Proletariat – Bases for Revolution (in Portuguese: Partido Revolucionário do Proletariado - Bases pela Revolução) was a political party in Portugal led by Luis Cardoso. It was founded on July 17, 2002 as a refoundation of Revolutionary Party of the Proletariat - Revolutionary Brigades.
