= Italian Communist Party of Julian Venetia =

The Italian Communist Party of Julian Venetia (Italian: Partito comunista italiano della Venezia Giulia, abbreviated PCIVG) was a communist organization in the Zone A of the Julian March after the Second World War.

== History ==
The group was founded as the Italian Communist Front (Italian: Fronte comunista italiano) in Gorizia in February 1946, following a split from the Communist Party of the Julian Region (PCRG). The founders of Italian Communist Front rejected the pro-Yugoslav position of the PCRG and adhered to the line issued by Palmiro Togliatti at the fifth congress of the Italian Communist Party (PCI) (i.e. that Trieste should be integrated in Italy, not Yugoslavia). The Italian Communist Front labelled PCRG as 'provocateurs' and 'secessionists'.

On March 24, 1946, the Italian Communist Front re-constituted itself as the PCIVG. The Italian Communist Party did not recognize PCIVG, wary of maintaining its relations with PCRG. PCIVG had a significant following in Gorizia, but was much less strong in Monfalcone.

The PCIVG published L'Unità giuliana.
