= Union of Communists of Armenia =

Union of Communists of Armenia (Armenian: Հայաստանի կոմունիստների միություն) was a communist party in Armenia.

== History ==
Prior to the 2003 Armenian parliamentary election, the party formed part of the Free and Fair Armenia electoral bloc together with the Marxist Party of Armenia. However, the bloc was denied registration on the ground that neither of the two parties had submitted proper registration.

On 7 July the same year, the Union of Communists of Armenia dissolved as party members merged with the United Communist Party of Armenia.

== See also ==
- List of political parties in Armenia
- Politics of Armenia
- Programs of political parties in Armenia
