= Marxist Party of Armenia =

Marxist Party of Armenia Հայաստանի մարքսիստական կուսակցություն
- Leader: Davit Hakobyan
- Founded: 1997
- Dissolved: 2009
- Merged into: United Communist Party of Armenia
- Headquarters: Yerevan
- Ideology: Marxism–Leninism
- Political position: Far-left

The Marxist Party of Armenia (Armenian: Հայաստանի մարքսիստական կուսակցություն, Hayastani Marksistakan Kusaktsutiun) was a political party in Armenia.

== History ==
Prior to the 2003 Armenian parliamentary election, the party formed part of the Free and Fair Armenia electoral alliance together with the Union of Communists of Armenia party. However, the bloc was denied registration on the grounds that neither of the two parties had submitted proper registration. The Marxist Party of Armenia had registered in 1997, but failed to get re-register by 1 January 2003. As such, neither of the two parties could participate in the 2003 elections.

On 7 July 2003, the party had officially merged with the United Communist Party of Armenia. Despite the merger, the party did participate independently in the 2007 Armenian parliamentary election, receiving just 0.20% of the vote. The party continued certain political activities until 2009.

== See also ==
- Programs of political parties in Armenia
- Politics of Armenia
