= Renewed Communist Party of Armenia =

The Renewed Communist Party of Armenia (HNKK) (Armenian: Հայաստանի կոմունիստական նորացված կուսակցություն, romanized: Hayastani Noratsvats Komunistakan Kusaktsutyun) was a political party in Armenia.

== History ==
The HNKK was established on 25 May 2002, by former Armenian Communist Party (HKK) leaders Yuri Manukian and Grant Voskanyan who had been expelled from HKK the previous year on the grounds that they had advocated cooperation with the government. Manukian became the First Secretary of the Central Committee of the party.

The HNKK published Khosq Bazmatc.

The HNKK endorsed Robert Kocharyan in the 2003 presidential elections.

== Electoral record ==
In the May 2003 parliamentary elections, HNKK listed 40 candidates to run in the elections. The party received 6,200 votes (0.52%) following the election, failing to win any seats in the National Assembly. The electoral slogan of the party was "Motherland. Work. Socialism.".

=== List of candidates in the 2003 parliamentary election ===
1. Manukyan Yura
2. Voskanyan Hrant
3. Melik-Ohanjanyan Yuri
4. Hayrapetyan Volodya
5. Gevorgyan Nelli
6. Mazmanyan Levon
7. Baroyan Vladimir
8. Stepanyan Herbert
9. Sahakyan Hayk
10. Razgoeva Svetlana
11. Hovhannisyan Samvel
12. Tovmasyan Eduard
13. Mikoyan Artavazd
14. Kharbutyan Galust
15. Khachatryan Gagik
16. Hovsepyan Armen
17. Chagharyan Samvel
18. Papyan Levon
19. Gevorgyan Andranik
20. Hambardzumyan Arshak
21. Hovakimyan Irina
22. Mkrtchyan Ruben
23. Chakhalyan Arsen
24. Stepanyan Minas
25. Ohanjanyan Razmik
26. Amiryan Ashot
27. Petrosyan Lyova
28. Sahakyan Seryoja
29. Movsisyan Sergey
30. Manukyan Jora
31. Ghazaryan Arman
32. Hakobyan Tsoghik
33. Harutyunyan Henrik
34. Lalayan Kamo
35. Israyelyan Rima
36. Jajoyan Senjik
37. Kharatyan Tamara
38. Ajamoghyan Vrej
39. Alexsanyan Karen
40. Avagyan Vladik

== Dissolvement and merger ==
On 7 July 2003, the HNKK officially merged into the United Communist Party of Armenia.

== See also ==
- Politics of Armenia
- Programs of political parties in Armenia
