= Communist Party (disambiguation) =

A communist party is a party that advocates the application of the social principles of communism.

Communist Party may also refer to:

== Africa ==
=== Benin ===
- Communist Party of Benin
- Marxist–Leninist Communist Party of Benin

=== Côte d'Ivoire ===
- Revolutionary Communist Party of Côte d'Ivoire

=== Madagascar ===
- Communist Party (French Section of the Communist International) of the Region of Madagascar
- Malagasy Communist Party

=== Nigeria ===
- Communist Party of Nigeria
- Nigerian Communist Party

=== Sudan ===
- Sudanese Communist Party
- Sudanese Communist Party – Revolutionary Leadership

=== Tunisia ===
- Tunisian Communist Party
- Tunisian Workers' Communist Party

=== Others in Africa ===
- Algerian Communist Party
- Angolan Communist Party
- Communist Party of Kenya
- Communist Party of Namibia (disambiguation)
- Communist Party of Lesotho
- Communist Party of Mozambique
- Communist Party of Réunion
- Communist Party of Togo
- Moroccan Communist Party
- Senegalese Communist Party
- South African Communist Party
- Southern Rhodesia Communist Party
- Swaziland Communist Party
- Voltaic Revolutionary Communist Party, in Burkina Faso

== Asia ==
=== Azerbaijan ===
- Azerbaijan Communist Party
- Azerbaijan Communist Party (1993)
- Azerbaijan Communist Party (on Platform of Marxism-Leninism)
- Communist Party of Azerbaijan (1996)
- United Communist Party of Azerbaijan

=== Burma ===
- Communist Party of Burma
- Shan States Communist Party

=== China ===
- Chinese Communist Party
- Revolutionary Communist Party of China

=== Georgia ===
- Communist Party of Abkhazia
- Communist Party of Georgia
- Communist Party of South Ossetia
- Georgian Communist party
- Georgian Workers Communist Party
- New Communist Party of Georgia
- Revived Communist Party of Georgia
- United Communist Party of Georgia

=== Indonesia ===
- Acoma Party
- Communist Party of Indonesia

=== Iran ===
- Communist Party of Iran
- Communist Party of Iran (1920)
- Communist Party of Iran (Marxist–Leninist–Maoist)

=== Iraq ===
- Iraqi Communist Party
- Kurdistan Communist Party-Iraq
- Leftist Worker-Communist Party of Iraq

=== Japan ===
- Amami Communist Party
- Communist Workers Party (Japan)
- Japan Communist Party (Marxist–Leninist)
- Japanese Communist Party
- Japanese Communist Party (Action Faction)

=== Jordan ===
- Jordanian Communist Party
- Jordanian Communist Toilers Party

=== Kazakhstan ===
- Communist Party of Kazakhstan
- People's Communist Party of Kazakhstan

=== Kyrgyzstan ===
- Communist Party of Kyrgyzstan
- Party of Communists of Kyrgyzstan

=== Malaysia ===
- Communist Party of Malaya/Marxist–Leninist
- Communist Party of Malaya/Revolutionary Faction
- Malayan Communist Party, now called Communist Party of Malaya (CPM)
- Malaysian Communist Party
- North Kalimantan Communist Party, in Borneo

=== Pakistan ===
- Communist Mazdoor Kissan Party
- Communist Party of Pakistan
- Communist Party of Pakistan (Thaheem)
- East Pakistan Communist Party (Marxist–Leninist)

=== Sri Lanka ===
- Ceylon Communist Party (Maoist)
- Communist Party of Sri Lanka

=== Syria ===
- Arab Communist Party
- Communist Labour Party (Syria)
- Syrian Communist Party
- Syrian–Lebanese Communist Party

=== Taiwan ===
- Taiwan Communist Party
- Taiwanese Communist Party

=== Turkey ===
- Communist Party of Turkey (disambiguation)
- List of illegal political parties in Turkey

=== Uzbekistan ===
- Communist Party of Bukhara
- Communist Party of Khorezm
- Communist Party of Uzbekistan

=== Vietnam ===
- Communist Party of Annam
- Communist Party of Indochina
- Communist Party of Vietnam

=== Others in Asia ===
(by country)

- Communist (Maoist) Party of Afghanistan
- Communist Party of Armenia (disambiguation)
- Communist Party of Artsakh
- Communist Party of Bangladesh (disambiguation)
- Bhutan Communist Party (Marxist–Leninist–Maoist)
- South Seas Communist Party, with a branch, the South Seas Communist Party in Burma
- List of communist parties in India
- Communist Party of Kampuchea, in Cambodia
- Communist Party of Korea
- Communist Party of Kurdistan
- Lebanese Communist Party
- List of communist parties in Nepal
- Palestinian Communist Party (disambiguation)
- Communist Party of the Philippines
- Communist Party in Saudi Arabia
- Communist Party of the Soviet Union (disambiguation)
- Communist Party of Tajikistan
- Communist Party of Thailand, initially the Communist Party of Siam
- Communist Party of Turkestan
- Tibetan Communist Party
- Communist Party of Turkmenistan

== Australasia/Oceania ==
=== Australia ===
- Communist Party of Australia (Marxist–Leninist)
- Communist Party of Australia
- Communist Party of Australia (1971)

=== New Zealand ===
- Communist Party of New Zealand

== Europe ==
=== Austria ===
- Communist Party of Austria
- Communist Workers Party (Austria)
- Jewish Communist Party of Austria

=== Belarus ===
- Communist Party (Bolsheviks) of Lithuania and Belorussia
- Communist Party of Belarus
- Communist Party of Belorussia
- Communist Party of West Belarus
- Party of Belarusian Communists

=== Belgium ===
- Communist Party (Flanders)
- Communist Party (Wallonia)
- Communist Party of Belgium
- Revolutionary Communist Party (Belgium)

=== Bosnia & Herzegovina ===
- Communist Party (Bosnia and Herzegovina)
- Workers' Communist Party of Bosnia and Herzegovina

=== Bulgaria ===
- Bulgarian Communist Party
- Bulgarian Communist Party – Marxists
- Bulgarian United Communist Party
- Communist Party of Bulgaria
- Communist Workers' Party of Bulgaria

=== Denmark ===
- Communist Party (Denmark)
- Communist Party in Denmark
- Communist Party of Denmark
- Communist Workers Party (Denmark)
- Workers' Communist Party (Denmark)

=== Estonia ===
- Communist Party of Estonia
- Communist Party of Estonia (1990)

=== Finland ===
- Communist Party of Finland
- Communist Party of Finland (1994)
- For Peace and Socialism – Communist Workers' Party

=== France ===
- Breton Communist Party
- French Communist Party
- Internationalist Communist Party (France)
- Workers' Communist Party of France

=== Greece ===
- Communist Party of Greece
- Communist Party of Greece (Interior)
- Communist Party of Greece (Marxist–Leninist)
- Marxist–Leninist Communist Party of Greece
- Movement for a United Communist Party of Greece

=== Hungary ===
- Hungarian Communist Party
- Hungarian Communist Workers' Party

=== Iceland ===
- Communist Party of Iceland
- Communist Party of Iceland (Marxist–Leninist)

=== Ireland ===
- Communist Party of Ireland
- Communist Party of Ireland (Marxist–Leninist)

=== Italy ===
- Communist Alternative Party
- Communist Party (Italy)
- Communist Party of the Free Territory of Trieste
- Communist Party of Italy
- Communist Refoundation Party
- International Communist Party
- Internationalist Communist Party (Italy)
- Italian Communist Party
- Italian Communist Party (2016)
- Marxist–Leninist Italian Communist Party
- Party of Italian Communists
- Workers' Communist Party (Italy)

=== Lithuania ===
- Communist Party of Lithuania
- Communist Party of the Memel Territory

=== Moldova ===
- Communist Party of Moldova
- Party of Communists of the Republic of Moldova

=== Netherlands ===
- Communist Party of Holland – Central Committee
- Communist Party of the Netherlands
- Communist Party of the Netherlands (1992)
- Communist Workers' Party of the Netherlands
- United Communist Party (Netherlands)

=== Norway ===
- Communist Party of Norway
- Workers' Communist Party (Norway)

=== Portugal ===
- Communist Party (Reconstructed)
- Communist Party of Portugal (in Construction)
- Communist Party of Portugal (Marxist–Leninist)
- Communist Party of Portugal (Marxist–Leninist) (1974)
- Communist Party of the Portuguese Workers / Reorganizative Movement of the Party of the Proletariat
- Communist Revolution Committee for the Formation of the Marxist–Leninist Party
- Communist Union for the Reconstruction of the Party (Marxist–Leninist)
- Organization for the Reconstruction of the Communist Party (Marxist–Leninist)
- Portuguese Communist Party

=== Romania ===
- Communist Party (Nepeceriști)
- Romanian Communist Party

=== Russia ===
- Communist Party of Russia (disambiguation)
- Communist Party of the Republic of Tatarstan

=== San Marino ===
- Communist Party (Marxist–Leninist) of San Marino
- Sammarinese Communist Party

=== Slovakia ===
- Communist Party of Slovakia
- Communist Party of Slovakia – 91
- Communist Party of Slovakia (1939)

=== Spain ===
==== Autonomous Communities of Spain ====
===== Aragon =====
- Communist Party of Aragon

===== Basque Country =====
- Communist Party of the Basque Homelands
- Communist Party of Euskadi

===== Canary Islands =====
- Communist Party of the Canaries
- Party of Communist Unification in the Canaries

===== Catalonia =====
- Catalan Communist Party
- Communist Party of Catalonia
- Communist Workers Party of Catalonia
- Party of the Communists of Catalonia

===== Galicia =====
- Communist Party of Galicia
- Communist Party of National Liberation

===== Valencia =====
- Communist Party of the Menadores
- Communist Party of the Valencian Country
- Communist Party of the Valencians
- Communist Party of the Valencian Country – Revolutionary Marxist

===== Others in Autonomous Communities of Spain =====
- Communist Party of Andalusia
- Communist Party of Asturias
- Communist Party of Cantabria
- Communist Party of Castile-La Mancha
- Communist Party of Castile-Leon
- Communist Party of Extremadura
- Communist Party of La Rioja
- Communist Party of the Region of Murcia

==== Others in Spain ====
- Communist Party of Spain (disambiguation)

=== Switzerland ===
- Communist Party (Switzerland)
- Communist Party Opposition (Switzerland)
- Communist Party of Switzerland
- Communist Party of Switzerland/Marxist–Leninists

=== Ukraine ===
- Communist Party (Bolsheviks) of Ukraine
- Communist Party of Ukraine
- Communist Party of Ukraine (renewed)
- Communist Party of Western Ukraine
- Communist Party of Workers and Peasants
- Ukrainian Communist Party

=== United Kingdom ===
- Communist Party of Great Britain (disambiguation)
- Communist Labour Party (Scotland)
- Communist Party of Northern Ireland
- British and Irish Communist Organisation
- Revolutionary Communist Party (disambiguation)

=== Others in Europe ===
(by country)

- Communist Party of Albania (disambiguation)
- Communist Party of Bohemia and Moravia, in the Czech Republic
- Communist Party of Czechoslovakia
- Communist Party (Free City of Danzig)
- Faroese Communist Party, Faroe Islands
- Communist Party of Germany (disambiguation)
- Communist Party of the Karelo-Finnish Soviet Socialist Republic
- Communist Party of Jersey
- Communist Party of Latvia
- Communist Party of Luxembourg
- Communist Party of Malta
- Communist Party of Transnistria
- Polish Communist Party (disambiguation)
- Communist Party of the Silesian Land, in Poland
- Transnistrian Communist Party
- Communist Party of Sweden (disambiguation)
- New Communist Party of Yugoslavia, in Serbia

== North America ==
=== Canada ===
- Communist Party of Canada (disambiguation)
- Workers' Communist Party of Canada

=== Dominican Republic ===
- International Communist Party (Dominican Republic)
- Communist Labour Party (Dominican Republic)
- Communist Party of Labour

=== Guatemala ===
- Communist Party of Guatemala (disambiguation)
- Guatemalan Party of Labour – Communist Party

=== Haiti ===
- Haitian Communist Party
- Unified Party of Haitian Communists

=== Mexico ===
- Bolshevik Communist Party, a Mexican party of the 1960s
- Communist Party of Mexico (Marxist–Leninist)
- Party of Mexican Communists
- Mexican Communist Party

=== United States ===
- Communist Party USA (disambiguation)
- Revolutionary Communist Party USA
- Communist Labor Party of America, organized in 1919
- Communist Party (Marxist–Leninist) (United States)
- Communist Workers' Party (United States)
- Provisional Communist Party
- The Communist Party USA and African Americans

=== Others in North America ===
(by country)

- Communist Party of Cuba
- Dominican Communist Party
- Communist Party of El Salvador
- Guadeloupe Communist Party
- Communist Party of Honduras
- Martinican Communist Party
- Communist Party of Nicaragua
- Puerto Rican Communist Party
- Communist Party of Trinidad and Tobago

== South America ==
=== Argentina ===
- Communist Party of Argentina
- Communist Party of Argentina (Extraordinary Congress)
- Revolutionary Communist Party of Argentina

=== Bolivia ===
- Communist Party of Bolivia
- Communist Party of Bolivia (Marxist–Leninist)
- Communist Party of Bolivia (Marxist–Leninist–Maoist)

=== Brazil ===
- Brazilian Communist Party
- Communist Party of Brazil
- Revolutionary Communist Party (Brazil)

=== Chile ===
- Chilean Communist Party (Proletarian Action)
- Communist Party of Chile
- Revolutionary Communist Party (Chile)

=== Colombia ===
- Clandestine Colombian Communist Party
- Colombian Communist Party
- Colombian Communist Party – Maoist
- Communist Labour Party (Colombia)
- Communist Party of Colombia (Marxist–Leninist)

=== Ecuador ===
- Communist Party of Ecuador
- Communist Party of Ecuador – Red Sun
- Marxist–Leninist Communist Party of Ecuador

=== Paraguay ===
- Paraguayan Communist Party
- Paraguayan Communist Party (Marxist–Leninist)

=== Peru ===
- Communist Party of Peru (Shining Path)
- Communist Party of Peru (Marxist–Leninist)
- Communist Party of Peru – Red Fatherland
- Communist Party – Red Star
- Peruvian Communist Party
- Peruvian Communist Party (Red Flag)
- Revolutionary Communist Party (Peru)
- Revolutionary Communist Party – Red Trench
- Revolutionary Communist Party (Working Class)

=== Uruguay ===
- Communist Party of Uruguay
- Revolutionary Communist Party of Uruguay

=== Venezuela ===
- Communist Party of Venezuela
- Marxist–Leninist Communist Party of Venezuela

== See also ==
- All-Union Communist Party (disambiguation)
- Communist Labor Party (disambiguation)
- Communist League (disambiguation)
- Jewish Communist Party (disambiguation)
- Libertarian Communist Party (disambiguation)
- List of Labour parties
- Maoist Communist Party (disambiguation)
- Marxist–Leninist Communist Party (disambiguation)
- New Communist Party (disambiguation)
- Revolutionary Communist (disambiguation)
- Socialist party (disambiguation)
- Worker-Communist Party (disambiguation)
- Workers' Party
