= Partido Comunista =

Partido Comunista is Spanish and Portuguese for Communist Party. Therefore, it may refer to any of the following political parties:

- Angolan Communist Party
- Argentine Workers' Communist Party
- Bolshevik Communist Party
- Brazilian Communist Party
- Brazilian Communist Party (1992)
- Chilean Communist Party (Proletarian Action)
- Clandestine Colombian Communist Party
- Colombian Communist Party
- Colombian Communist Party - Maoist
- Communist Party (Marxist-Leninist) of Bolivia
- Communist Party of Andalusia
- Communist Party of Argentina
- Communist Party of Argentina (Extraordinary Congress)
- Communist Party of Bolivia
- Communist Party of Bolivia (Marxist-Leninist)
- Communist Party of Brazil
- Communist Party of Castile – La Mancha
- Communist Party of Chile
- Communist Party of Colombia (Marxist-Leninist)
- Communist Party of Costa Rica
- Communist Party of Cuba
- Communist Party of Ecuador
- Communist Party of Ecuador - Red Sun
- Communist Party of El Salvador
- Communist Party of Extremadura
- Communist Party of Guatemala (disambiguation), various organizations
- Communist Party of Honduras
- Communist Party of Labour
- Communist Party of Madrid
- Communist Party of Mexico (Marxist-Leninist)
- Communist Party of Mozambique
- Communist Party of National Liberation
- Communist Party of Nicaragua
- Communist Party of Panama
- Communist Party of Peru
- Communist Party of Peru (Marxist-Leninist)
- Communist Party of Peru - Red Fatherland
- Communist Party of Portugal (in Construction)
- Communist Party of Portugal (Marxist-Leninist)
- Communist Party of Portugal (Marxist-Leninist) (1974)
- Communist Party of Spain (disambiguation), various organizations
- Communist Party of the Menadores
- Communist Party of the Peoples of Spain
- Communist Party of the Portuguese Workers / Reorganizative Movement of the Party of the Proletariat
- Communist Party of the Region of Murcia
- Communist Party of the Valencian Country
- Communist Party of the Valencian Country - Revolutionary Marxist
- Communist Party of Uruguay
- Communist Party of Venezuela
- Communist Party (Reconstructed)
- Communist Party - Red Star
- Dominican Communist Party
- Guatemalan Party of Labour - Communist Party
- International Communist Party (Dominican Republic)
- Libertarian Communist Party (Brazil)
- Libertarian Communist Party (Spain)
- Marxist-Leninist Communist Party of Ecuador
- Marxist-Leninist Communist Party of Honduras
- Mexican Communist Party
- Paraguayan Communist Party
- Paraguayan Communist Party (Marxist-Leninist)
- Peruvian Communist Party
- Peruvian Communist Party (Red Flag)
- Portuguese Communist Party
- Puerto Rican Communist Party
- Revolutionary Communist Party of Argentina
- Revolutionary Communist Party (Brazil)
- Revolutionary Communist Party (Chile)
- Revolutionary Communist Party (Peru)
- Revolutionary Communist Party - Red Trench
- Revolutionary Communist Party (Spain)
- Revolutionary Communist Party (Working Class)
- Spanish Communist Party
- Spanish Communist Workers' Party (1921)
- Spanish Communist Workers' Party (1973)
- Unified Communist Party of Spain
- Workers' Communist Party (Spain)
