= Revolutionary Communist =

Revolutionary Communist (Revolutionary Communists), in addition to its direct meaning of "Communist revolutionary" may refer to members of the following parties:

- Revolutionary Communists (1918-1920) in Soviet Russia
- Revolutionary Communist Group (disambiguation)
- Revolutionary Communist League (disambiguation)
- Revolutionary Communist Organisation (disambiguation)
- Revolutionary Communist Party
- Revolutionary Communist Youth (disambiguation)
- Revolutionary Communist Party, USA
- Organization of Communist Revolutionaries, an Iranian Maoist organization
- The members of Russian Communist Workers' Party – Revolutionary Party of Communists are also called "Revolutionary Communists"

== See also ==
- Revolutionary committee (disambiguation)
