= Union of Communists in Bulgaria =

Bulgarian political party

Union of Communists in Bulgaria Съюз на Комунистите в България
- Leader: Pavel Ivanov
- Founded: 1995
- Headquarters: Sofia
- Ideology: Communism; Marxism
- Political position: Left-wing to far-left
- National affiliation: Coalition for Bulgaria
- European affiliation: Initiative of Communist and Workers' Parties
- Colours: Red, white
- National Assembly: 0 / 240
- European Parliament: 0 / 17

Website
- komunistibg.com

The Union of Communists in Bulgaria (Bulgarian: Съюз на комунистите в България, romanized: Sayuz na Komunistite v Balgariya, SKB) is a communist party in Bulgaria, registered in 1995. It has participated in all elections since then, alone or in coalition.

In 2011, the party tried to claim ownership over the Buzludzha monument.

On 23 June 2013, the Central Committee of the Union of Communists in Bulgaria accepted the resignation of its then presiding chairman Kostadin Chakarov (2010–2013), a former adviser to Todor Zhivkov, and elected by an overwhelming majority Pavel Ivanov as the new chairman of the party.

The Union of Communists takes its name from Union of German and European Communists, established in the 19th century by Karl Marx and Friedrich Engels. It unites citizens and adopts Marxism as its political creed. The Union of Communists in Bulgaria considers itself the conceptual and political heir of Bulgarian Communist Party. In the 2013 parliamentary election the party received 6,168 votes (0.17% of the popular vote), remaining outside parliament.

In the 2021 parliamentary elections (July and November) the party was party of the electoral list Left Union for a Clean and Holy Republic.

== See also ==
- Bulgarian Communist Party – Marxists
- Bulgarian United Communist Party
