= Communist Party of Nigeria =

- Founded: November 1960
- Ideology: Communism; Marxism–Leninism

Website
- https://communistpartyofnigeria.com/

The Communist Party of Nigeria (CPN) was a communist party in Nigeria. It was founded in November 1960 in Kano, largely by cadres of the Nigerian Youth Congress. Initially, the party drew political inspiration from the Communist Party of Great Britain. However, the constitution adopted by the party was based on the 1945 constitution of the Chinese Communist Party.

The party remained relatively isolated from international relations, not having close links with either the Communist Party of the Soviet Union or the Chinese Communist Party. When the Socialist Workers' and Farmers' Party of Nigeria was formed in 1963, the CPN denounced it as "the latest effort in a long series of opportunist and egoistic acts which have contributed much towards disrupting the socialist movement in Nigeria."

The CPN was banned by Decree 34 of the regime of General Johnson Aguiyi-Ironsi in 1966.

== See also ==
- Nigerian Communist Party
