= Yukari Manabe =

American infectious disease physician

Yukari C. Manabe
- Born: Yukari C. Manabe
- Education: Yale University (BA); Columbia University Vagelos College of Physicians and Surgeons (MD)
- Known for: Point-of-care infectious disease diagnostics; TB/HIV research; global health capacity building
- Parent: Syukuro Manabe (father)
- Awards: Fellow of the Royal College of Physicians (FRCP); Fellow of the Infectious Diseases Society of America (FIDSA); Fellow of the Uganda National Academy of Sciences
- Scientific career
- Fields: Infectious disease; Point-of-care testing; Global health
- Workplaces: Johns Hopkins University School of Medicine

Yukari C. Manabe is an American physician-scientist and Professor of Medicine in the Division of Infectious Diseases at the Johns Hopkins University School of Medicine. She holds joint appointments in the Johns Hopkins Bloomberg School of Public Health in the Departments of International Health and Molecular Microbiology and Immunology. She is the founding Director of the Center for Innovative Diagnostics for Infectious Diseases (CIDID) at Johns Hopkins, and Director of Global Health Research and Innovation within the Johns Hopkins Center for Global Health.

Her research focuses on rapid and point-of-care diagnostics for HIV, tuberculosis (TB), sexually transmitted infections, and respiratory viruses including SARS-CoV-2, with particular attention to resource-limited settings in sub-Saharan Africa. She has authored more than 300 peer-reviewed publications.

She is the daughter of Syukuro Manabe, who was awarded the Nobel Prize in Physics in 2021.

== Early life and education ==
Yukari Manabe and her sister Nagisa attended Princeton Regional Schools and subsequently Yale University. Manabe graduated from Columbia University College of Physicians and Surgeons with an MD in 1991, at a time when the majority of internal medicine patients at her training hospital had HIV or AIDS.

After completing her residency in internal medicine at The Johns Hopkins Hospital and a fellowship in infectious diseases at the Johns Hopkins University School of Medicine, she joined the Johns Hopkins faculty in 1999.

== Career ==
=== Tuberculosis research ===
Early in her career, Manabe worked on the immunopathogenesis of tuberculosis at the Johns Hopkins Center for Tuberculosis Research, studying latency, reactivation, and immune reconstitution inflammatory syndrome (IRIS) using comparative animal models. Her 2008 paper describing an aerosol rabbit model of TB latency, reactivation, and IRIS, published in Tuberculosis (Edinb.), described what was at the time the only animal model of IRIS. The model showed that IRIS severity depended on antigen load at the time of immunosuppression, mirroring observations in HIV patients responding to antiretroviral therapy.

=== Infectious disease diagnostics ===
In 2017, Manabe became the founding Clinical Director of the John G. Bartlett Specialty Practice at Johns Hopkins, an outpatient clinic for infectious disease patients. In 2019, she founded CIDID https://jhcidid.org/, a centre funded primarily by the National Institutes of Health, which evaluates and accelerates rapid diagnostic tests across a range of infectious diseases. The centre's work has included rapid diagnostics for gonorrhea, chlamydia, HIV, and syphilis, and it participated in the clinical study supporting FDA clearance of the first point-of-care molecular diagnostic for hepatitis C in June 2024. CIDID has also developed a tuberculosis point-of-care test costing less than two dollars.

=== Uganda and global health ===
From 2007 to 2012, Manabe was seconded to the Infectious Diseases Institute (IDI) at Makerere University College of Health Sciences in Kampala, Uganda. She served first as Associate Medical Laboratory Director of the College of American Pathologists-accredited Makerere University–Johns Hopkins University Clinical Core Laboratory, then from 2008 to 2012 as Head of Research at the IDI, where she oversaw the training of Ugandan clinical investigators and built research infrastructure. She retains an honorary appointment at Makerere University College of Health Sciences.

A 2011 paper in Health Research Policy and Systems, led by Manabe, described the IDI's model of in-country research capacity building, emphasizing the need to train researchers at multiple levels within a supportive institutional structure.

Manabe and colleagues at IDI worked to integrate syphilis testing into existing HIV testing programs for pregnant women at Ugandan government health facilities, including through dual HIV/syphilis point-of-care platforms.

=== COVID-19 pandemic ===
During the COVID-19 pandemic, Manabe contributed to the NIH Rapid Acceleration of Diagnostics (RADx) program, and CIDID was involved in evaluating SARS-CoV-2 rapid antigen tests submitted by manufacturers for Emergency Use Authorization by the FDA.

In 2020, she was quoted in The Washington Post as an early advocate for rapid home antigen testing, arguing that arming contact tracers with rapid antigen tests could be effective at identifying the most infectious cases.

A 2020 Viewpoint in JAMA, co-authored by Manabe, Sharfstein, and Armstrong, argued for broader COVID-19 testing strategies, including rapid antigen and self-administered tests, while noting that testing remained insufficient as a standalone public health measure.

A 2021 study in Clinical Infectious Diseases, on which Manabe was a co-author, reported that antigen-based testing — but not real-time PCR — correlated with the presence of culturable SARS-CoV-2, providing evidence that rapid antigen tests could serve as a practical indicator of infectiousness.

In January 2022, during the Omicron wave, Manabe was interviewed by NPR on the correct use of rapid antigen tests, advising that tests were most sensitive when used with symptoms and recommending testing approximately three days after a known exposure.

== Medical societies ==
- Fellow of the Royal College of Physicians (FRCP) – Listed in the Royal College of Physicians Annual Report 2021.
- Fellow of the Infectious Diseases Society of America (FIDSA)
- Fellow of the Uganda National Academy of Sciences (FUNAS)

== Personal life ==
Manabe is the daughter of Syukuro "Suki" Manabe (born September 21, 1931), a Japanese-American physicist and climatologist at Princeton University, who was awarded the Nobel Prize in Physics in 2021 jointly with Klaus Hasselmann and Giorgio Parisi for his contributions to the physical modelling of Earth's climate and the reliable prediction of global warming. Yukari's mother, Nobuko ("Noko") Nakamura, is a practitioner and teacher of Japanese tea ceremony. Her sister Nagisa owns and operates a certified organic farm in Princeton, New Jersey. Manabe is married to James Campbell, a Professor of Pediatric Infectious Diseases at the University of Maryland School of Medicine.
