= ICL =

ICL may refer to:

== Companies and organizations ==
- Idaho Conservation League, environmental organisation in the United States
- Imperial College London, a UK university
- Indian Confederation of Labour
- Indian Cricket League
- Inorganic Chemistry Laboratory, Department of Chemistry, University of Oxford
- ICL Group Ltd., an Israeli multi-national chemical company
- ICL Earthquake Early Warning System, a seismic alert system developed by the Institution for Care-Life (ICL) in Chengdu, China
- International Computers Limited, a UK company acquired by Fujitsu
- International Confederation of Labor, a global anarcho-syndicalist union federation
- International Congress of Linguists
- International Consortium on Landslides, Kyoto, Japan

== Computing ==
- Ice Lake (microprocessor) series Intel CPUs
- .icl, filename extension for an icon library
- Clean (programming language) source filename extension
- Inter-Chassis Link, Brocade's name for an InterSwitch Trunk link

== Chemistry and biology ==
- Idiopathic CD4+ lymphocytopenia, a medical condition
- Implantable collamer lens
- Isocitrate lyase, an enzyme
- ICl, chemical symbol for iodine monochloride
- Intracaval leiomyomatosis

== Other ==
- Image cash letter, a virtual cheque
- International constitutional law
- International criminal law
- Inrush current limiter, in electronics
- CAL Cargo Air Lines of Israel (ICAO airline code: ICL)
- Icelandic Sign Language (ISO 639-3 code icl)

== See also ==
- International Communist League (disambiguation), communist political parties
