= Communist Party of Bangladesh (disambiguation) =

Communist Party of Bangladesh is a Marxist–Leninist communist party in Bangladesh.

Communist Party of Bangladesh may also refer to:

- Communist Party of Bangladesh (Marxist–Leninist)
  - Communist Party of Bangladesh (Marxist–Leninist) (Barua)
  - Communist Party of Bangladesh (Marxist–Leninist) (Dutta)
  - Communist Party of Bangladesh (Marxist–Leninist) (Umar)
- Communist Party of Bangladesh (Marxist)
- Bangladesh Communist Party (Leninist)

== See also ==
- Communist Party (disambiguation)
