= Lucky Udu =

Nigerian video blogger

Lucky David Udu (born 2 June 1997) is a Nigerian videographer, YouTuber, and content creator. He is the founder of Lucky Udu Studio and the Lucky Udu Foundation. Udu tells stories about various Nigerian people and communities through video content published on social media. He is renowned for platforming forgotten Nigerian celebrities. He also uses his platforms to crowdsource funding and other kinds of patronage and support for such individuals.

== Background and career ==
Udu hails from Onwanta, Ika North East. He studied English at Elizade University. He is the Director of Youth Sensitisation and Rehabilitation Affairs at the Nigerian Youth Congress. Udu has mentioned in an interview that he was inspired to use social media to tell important stories from watching Nas Daily. Among the numerous former celebrities Udu has interviewed are Nollywood actor Hanks Anuku; musicians Sky B, J'odie, Adaz, Franca Tia Tia, Agatha Moses and Soty; as well as skitmakers Denilson Igwe and Thespian Nozy. In October 2022, Udu extensively documented the flood disaster that devastated Lokoja and other parts of Nigeria.
