= RCG =

RCG may refer to:

- Radio Crne Gore, a radio station in Montenegro
- Republic of Montenegro, state preceding independent Montenegro
- The Radio Church of God, now the Worldwide Church of God
- XHRCG-TDT, a television station in Saltillo, Mexico, branded as RCG Televisión
- Range concatenation grammars, a type of formal grammar
- Restored Church of God
- Revolutionary Communist Group (disambiguation), several political parties
- Royal Cambodian Government: see Politics of Cambodia
- Royal Caribbean Group, a cruise holding company
- Rural Connectivity Group, a joint venture between New Zealand mobile network operators
- Phalaris arundinacea (reed canary grass), a species of grass
