= 1983 Spanish local elections in Castilla–La Mancha =

This article presents the results breakdown of the local elections held in Castilla–La Mancha on 8 May 1983. The following tables show detailed results in the autonomous community's most populous municipalities, sorted alphabetically.

== City control ==
The following table lists party control in the most populous municipalities, including provincial capitals (highlighted in bold). Gains for a party are highlighted in that party's colour.

Municipality	Population	Previous control	New control
**Albacete**	116,484	Spanish Socialist Workers' Party (PSOE)	Spanish Socialist Workers' Party (PSOE)
**Ciudad Real**	50,151	Union of the Democratic Centre (UCD)	People's Coalition (AP–PDP–UL) (AICR in 1987)
**Cuenca**	40,007	Union of the Democratic Centre (UCD)	People's Coalition (AP–PDP–UL) (PDP in 1986)
**Guadalajara**	55,137	Spanish Socialist Workers' Party (PSOE)	Spanish Socialist Workers' Party (PSOE)
Talavera de la Reina	64,840	Spanish Socialist Workers' Party (PSOE)	Spanish Socialist Workers' Party (PSOE)
**Toledo**	54,335	Union of the Democratic Centre (UCD)	Spanish Socialist Workers' Party (PSOE)

== Municipalities ==
=== Albacete ===
Population: 116,484

← Summary of the 8 May 1983 City Council of Albacete election results →
Parties and alliances	Popular vote			Seats	
Parties and alliances	Votes	%	±pp	Total	+/−
Spanish Socialist Workers' Party (PSOE)	27,905	53.82	+17.64	**16**	+5
People's Coalition (AP–PDP–UL)^{1}	18,639	35.95	+32.55	**10**	+10
Communist Party of Spain (PCE)	2,838	5.47	−11.64	**1**	−4
Democratic and Social Centre (CDS)	1,025	1.98	New	0	±0
Manchegan Regionalist Party (PRM)	730	1.41	New	0	±0
Communist Movement (MC)	533	1.03	+0.54	0	±0
Independents (INDEP)	176	0.34	New	0	±0
Union of the Democratic Centre (UCD)	n/a	n/a	−37.87	0	−11
Blank ballots	0	0.00	±0.00		
**Total**	**51,846**			**27**	**±0**
Valid votes	51,846	100.00	+0.53		
Invalid votes	0	0.00	−0.53		
**Votes cast / turnout**	**51,846**	**63.76**	**+4.08**		
Abstentions	29,469	36.24	−4.08		
**Registered voters**	**81,315**				
Sources
Footnotes: ^{1} People's Coalition results are compared to Democratic Coalition totals in the 1979 election.

=== Ciudad Real ===
Population: 50,151

← Summary of the 8 May 1983 City Council of Ciudad Real election results →
Parties and alliances	Popular vote			Seats	
Parties and alliances	Votes	%	±pp	Total	+/−
People's Coalition (AP–PDP–UL)^{1}	11,938	55.12	+53.44	**15**	+15
Spanish Socialist Workers' Party (PSOE)	8,370	38.65	+4.28	**10**	+2
Communist Party of Spain (PCE)	730	3.37	−4.77	0	−1
Independents (INDEP)	339	1.57	−7.09	0	−2
Spanish Phalanx of the CNSO (FE–JONS)	281	1.30	New	0	±0
Union of the Democratic Centre (UCD)	n/a	n/a	−45.86	0	−10
Blank ballots	0	0.00	±0.00		
**Total**	**21,658**			**25**	**+4**
Valid votes	21,658	100.00	+1.60		
Invalid votes	0	0.00	−1.60		
**Votes cast / turnout**	**21,658**	**60.27**	**+1.58**		
Abstentions	14,279	39.73	−1.58		
**Registered voters**	**35,937**				
Sources
Footnotes: ^{1} People's Coalition results are compared to Democratic Coalition totals in the 1979 election.

=== Cuenca ===
Population: 40,007

← Summary of the 8 May 1983 City Council of Cuenca election results →
Parties and alliances	Popular vote			Seats	
Parties and alliances	Votes	%	±pp	Total	+/−
People's Coalition (AP–PDP–UL)	8,776	46.48	New	**11**	+11
Spanish Socialist Workers' Party (PSOE)	8,314	44.03	+17.15	**10**	+4
Liberal Democratic Party (PDL)	795	4.21	New	0	±0
Communist Party of Spain (PCE)	660	3.50	−3.37	0	−1
Democratic and Social Centre (CDS)	337	1.78	New	0	±0
Union of the Democratic Centre (UCD)	n/a	n/a	−64.25	0	−14
Blank ballots	0	0.00	±0.00		
**Total**	**18,882**			**21**	**±0**
Valid votes	18,882	100.00	+4.16		
Invalid votes	0	0.00	−4.16		
**Votes cast / turnout**	**18,882**	**65.06**	**+2.63**		
Abstentions	10,142	34.94	−2.63		
**Registered voters**	**29,024**				

=== Guadalajara ===
Population: 55,137

← Summary of the 8 May 1983 City Council of Guadalajara election results →
Parties and alliances	Popular vote			Seats	
Parties and alliances	Votes	%	±pp	Total	+/−
Spanish Socialist Workers' Party (PSOE)	14,324	50.04	+17.98	**14**	+7
People's Coalition (AP–PDP–UL)^{1}	10,794	37.71	+5.40	**10**	+3
Communist Party of Spain (PCE)	1,915	6.69	−13.44	**1**	−3
Democratic and Social Centre (CDS)	1,152	4.02	New	0	±0
Liberal Democratic Party (PDL)	439	1.53	New	0	±0
National Union (UN)	n/a	n/a	−12.91	0	−3
Blank ballots	0	0.00	±0.00		
**Total**	**28,624**			**25**	**+4**
Valid votes	28,624	100.00	+7.57		
Invalid votes	0	0.00	−7.57		
**Votes cast / turnout**	**28,624**	**71.98**	**+9.66**		
Abstentions	11,144	28.02	−9.66		
**Registered voters**	**39,768**				
Sources
Footnotes: ^{1} People's Coalition results are compared to Democratic Coalition totals in the 1979 election.

=== Talavera de la Reina ===
Population: 64,840

← Summary of the 8 May 1983 City Council of Talavera de la Reina election results →
Parties and alliances	Popular vote			Seats	
Parties and alliances	Votes	%	±pp	Total	+/−
Spanish Socialist Workers' Party (PSOE)	17,474	59.02	+23.40	**16**	+7
People's Coalition (AP–PDP–UL)	8,435	28.49	New	**8**	+8
Communist Party of Spain (PCE)	2,023	6.83	−14.15	**1**	−4
Independents (INDEP)	789	2.67	New	0	±0
Democratic and Social Centre (CDS)	562	1.90	New	0	±0
Liberal Democratic Party (PDL)	323	1.09	New	0	±0
Union of the Democratic Centre (UCD)	n/a	n/a	−37.65	0	−10
Party of Labour of Spain (PTE)	n/a	n/a	−5.76	0	−1
Blank ballots	0	0.00	±0.00		
**Total**	**29,606**			**25**	**±0**
Valid votes	29,606	100.00	+9.11		
Invalid votes	0	0.00	−9.11		
**Votes cast / turnout**	**29,606**	**64.63**	**+1.53**		
Abstentions	16,201	35.37	−1.53		
**Registered voters**	**45,807**				

=== Toledo ===
Population: 54,335

← Summary of the 8 May 1983 City Council of Toledo election results →
Parties and alliances	Popular vote			Seats	
Parties and alliances	Votes	%	±pp	Total	+/−
People's Coalition (AP–PDP–UL)^{1}	10,832	42.00	+35.56	**11**	+10
Spanish Socialist Workers' Party (PSOE)	10,216	39.61	+12.90	**11**	+4
Communist Party of Spain (PCE)	2,964	11.49	−9.77	**3**	−2
Liberal Democratic Party (PDL)	952	3.69	New	0	±0
Democratic and Social Centre (CDS)	623	2.42	New	0	±0
Spanish Phalanx of the CNSO (FE–JONS)	205	0.79	New	0	±0
Union of the Democratic Centre (UCD)	n/a	n/a	−39.58	0	−11
New Force (FN)	n/a	n/a	−6.01	0	−1
Blank ballots	0	0.00	±0.00		
**Total**	**25,792**			**25**	**±0**
Valid votes	25,792	100.00	+2.91		
Invalid votes	0	0.00	−2.91		
**Votes cast / turnout**	**25,792**	**65.78**	**+3.93**		
Abstentions	13,416	34.22	−3.93		
**Registered voters**	**39,208**				
Sources
Footnotes: ^{1} People's Coalition results are compared to Democratic Coalition totals in the 1979 election.

== See also ==
- 1983 Castilian-Manchegan regional election
