= Lucha =

Lucha is Spanish for "fight" or "struggle". It may refer to:

- Wrestling, a martial art that involves grappling with an opponent and striving to obtain a position of advantage through different throws or techniques
- Lucha libre, a style of predetermined professional wrestling originating in Mexico
- Lucha Underground, an American-Mexican television series which aired on El Rey Network
- Lucha, a publication by the Communist Party of Labour in the Dominican Republic
- Lutte Pour Le Changement, a civil rights organisation in the Democratic Republic of the Congo also known as "LUCHA"
- lucha a charicter from katamari
