= Partido Comunista Revolucionario =

Partido Comunista Revolucionario may refer to:

- Revolutionary Communist Party of Argentina
- Revolutionary Communist Party (Brazil) (Partido Comunista Revolucionário)
- Revolutionary Communist Party (Chile)
- Revolutionary Communist Party (Peru)
- Revolutionary Communist Party (Working Class) (Peru)
- Revolutionary Communist Party (Spain)
- Revolutionary Communist Party – Red Trench (Peru)
