= 1979 Spanish local elections in Castilla–La Mancha =

This article presents the results breakdown of the local elections held in Castilla–La Mancha on 3 April 1979. The following tables show detailed results in the autonomous community's most populous municipalities, sorted alphabetically.

== City control ==
The following table lists party control in the most populous municipalities, including provincial capitals (highlighted in bold).

Municipality	Population	New control
**Albacete**	105,408	Spanish Socialist Workers' Party (PSOE)
**Ciudad Real**	48,075	Union of the Democratic Centre (UCD)
**Cuenca**	38,601	Union of the Democratic Centre (UCD)
**Guadalajara**	47,758	Spanish Socialist Workers' Party (PSOE)
Talavera de la Reina	59,515	Spanish Socialist Workers' Party (PSOE)
**Toledo**	54,999	Union of the Democratic Centre (UCD)

== Municipalities ==
=== Albacete ===
Population: 105,408

Summary of the 3 April 1979 City Council of Albacete election results →
Parties and alliances	Popular vote			Seats	
Parties and alliances	Votes	%	±pp	Total	+/−
Union of the Democratic Centre (UCD)	16,282	37.87	n/a	**11**	n/a
Spanish Socialist Workers' Party (PSOE)	15,556	36.18	n/a	**11**	n/a
Communist Party of Spain (PCE)	7,354	17.11	n/a	**5**	n/a
Democratic Coalition (CD)	1,460	3.40	n/a	0	n/a
New Force (FN)	1,090	2.54	n/a	0	n/a
Spanish Socialist Workers' Party (historical) (PSOEh)	724	1.68	n/a	0	n/a
Party of Labour of Spain (PTE)	257	0.60	n/a	0	n/a
Communist Movement–Organization of Communist Left (MC–OIC)	210	0.49	n/a	0	n/a
Blank ballots	0	0.00	n/a		
**Total**	**42,993**			**27**	**n/a**
Valid votes	42,993	99.47	n/a		
Invalid votes	228	0.53	n/a		
**Votes cast / turnout**	**43,221**	**59.68**	**n/a**		
Abstentions	29,195	40.32	n/a		
**Registered voters**	**72,416**				

=== Ciudad Real ===
Population: 48,075

Summary of the 3 April 1979 City Council of Ciudad Real election results →
Parties and alliances	Popular vote			Seats	
Parties and alliances	Votes	%	±pp	Total	+/−
Union of the Democratic Centre (UCD)	8,594	45.86	n/a	**10**	n/a
Spanish Socialist Workers' Party (PSOE)	6,441	34.37	n/a	**8**	n/a
Independents (INDEP)	1,623	8.66	n/a	**2**	n/a
Communist Party of Spain (PCE)	1,526	8.14	n/a	**1**	n/a
Democratic Coalition (CD)	314	1.68	n/a	0	n/a
Workers' Revolutionary Organization (ORT)	240	1.28	n/a	0	n/a
Blank ballots	0	0.00	n/a		
**Total**	**18,738**			**21**	**n/a**
Valid votes	18,738	98.40	n/a		
Invalid votes	304	1.60	n/a		
**Votes cast / turnout**	**19,042**	**58.69**	**n/a**		
Abstentions	13,404	41.31	n/a		
**Registered voters**	**32,446**				

=== Cuenca ===
Population: 38,601

Summary of the 3 April 1979 City Council of Cuenca election results →
Parties and alliances	Popular vote			Seats	
Parties and alliances	Votes	%	±pp	Total	+/−
Union of the Democratic Centre (UCD)	10,590	64.25	n/a	**14**	n/a
Spanish Socialist Workers' Party (PSOE)	4,431	26.88	n/a	**6**	n/a
Communist Party of Spain (PCE)	1,462	8.87	n/a	**1**	n/a
Blank ballots	0	0.00	n/a		
**Total**	**16,483**			**21**	**n/a**
Valid votes	16,483	95.84	n/a		
Invalid votes	716	4.16	n/a		
**Votes cast / turnout**	**17,199**	**62.43**	**n/a**		
Abstentions	10,349	37.57	n/a		
**Registered voters**	**27,548**				

=== Guadalajara ===
Population: 47,758

Summary of the 3 April 1979 City Council of Guadalajara election results →
Parties and alliances	Popular vote			Seats	
Parties and alliances	Votes	%	±pp	Total	+/−
Democratic Coalition (CD)	6,462	32.31	n/a	**7**	n/a
Spanish Socialist Workers' Party (PSOE)	6,412	32.06	n/a	**7**	n/a
Communist Party of Spain (PCE)	4,027	20.13	n/a	**4**	n/a
National Union (UN)	2,583	12.91	n/a	**3**	n/a
Communist Organization of Spain (Red Flag) (OCE–BR)	518	2.59	n/a	0	n/a
Blank ballots	0	0.00	n/a		
**Total**	**20,002**			**21**	**n/a**
Valid votes	20,002	92.43	n/a		
Invalid votes	1,638	7.57	n/a		
**Votes cast / turnout**	**21,640**	**62.32**	**n/a**		
Abstentions	13,086	37.68	n/a		
**Registered voters**	**34,726**				

=== Talavera de la Reina ===
Population: 59,515

Summary of the 3 April 1979 City Council of Talavera de la Reina election results →
Parties and alliances	Popular vote			Seats	
Parties and alliances	Votes	%	±pp	Total	+/−
Union of the Democratic Centre (UCD)	8,606	37.65	n/a	**10**	n/a
Spanish Socialist Workers' Party (PSOE)	8,142	35.62	n/a	**9**	n/a
Communist Party of Spain (PCE)	4,795	20.98	n/a	**5**	n/a
Party of Labour of Spain (PTE)	1,316	5.76	n/a	**1**	n/a
Blank ballots	0	0.00	n/a		
**Total**	**22,859**			**25**	**n/a**
Valid votes	22,859	90.89	n/a		
Invalid votes	2,290	9.11	n/a		
**Votes cast / turnout**	**25,149**	**63.10**	**n/a**		
Abstentions	14,704	36.90	n/a		
**Registered voters**	**39,853**				

=== Toledo ===
Population: 54,999

Summary of the 3 April 1979 City Council of Toledo election results →
Parties and alliances	Popular vote			Seats	
Parties and alliances	Votes	%	±pp	Total	+/−
Union of the Democratic Centre (UCD)	9,339	39.58	n/a	11	n/a
Spanish Socialist Workers' Party (PSOE)	6,302	26.71	n/a	7	n/a
Communist Party of Spain (PCE)	5,016	21.26	n/a	5	n/a
Democratic Coalition (CD)	1,520	6.44	n/a	1	n/a
New Force (FN)	1,417	6.01	n/a	1	n/a
Blank ballots	0	0.00	n/a		
**Total**	**23,594**			25	**n/a**
Valid votes	23,594	97.09	n/a		
Invalid votes	706	2.91	n/a		
**Votes cast / turnout**	**24,300**	**61.85**	**n/a**		
Abstentions	14,987	38.15	n/a		
**Registered voters**	**39,287**				
