= 1987 Spanish local elections in Castilla–La Mancha =

This article presents the results breakdown of the local elections held in Castilla–La Mancha on 10 June 1987. The following tables show detailed results in the autonomous community's most populous municipalities, sorted alphabetically.

== City control ==
The following table lists party control in the most populous municipalities, including provincial capitals (highlighted in bold). Gains for a party are highlighted in that party's colour.

Municipality	Population	Previous control	New control
**Albacete**	126,110	Spanish Socialist Workers' Party (PSOE)	Spanish Socialist Workers' Party (PSOE)
**Ciudad Real**	54,409	Independent Group of Ciudad Real (AICR)	Independent Group of Ciudad Real (AICR) (PSOE in 1991)
**Cuenca**	41,034	People's Democratic Party (PDP)	People's Alliance (AP)
**Guadalajara**	59,080	Spanish Socialist Workers' Party (PSOE)	Spanish Socialist Workers' Party (PSOE)
Talavera de la Reina	67,311	Spanish Socialist Workers' Party (PSOE)	Democratic and Social Centre (CDS)
**Toledo**	58,198	Spanish Socialist Workers' Party (PSOE)	People's Alliance (AP)

== Municipalities ==
=== Albacete ===
Population: 126,110

← Summary of the 10 June 1987 City Council of Albacete election results →
Parties and alliances	Popular vote			Seats	
Parties and alliances	Votes	%	±pp	Total	+/−
Spanish Socialist Workers' Party (PSOE)	23,485	43.17	−10.65	**13**	−3
People's Alliance (AP)^{1}	17,296	31.79	−4.16	**9**	−1
Democratic and Social Centre (CDS)	6,641	12.21	+10.23	**3**	+3
United Left (IU)^{2}	4,266	7.84	+2.37	**2**	+1
People's Democratic Party–Independent Farmers' Group (PDP–AAI)	835	1.53	New	0	±0
Workers' Party of Spain–Communist Unity (PTE–UC)	668	1.23	New	0	±0
Manchegan Regionalist Party (PRM)	194	0.36	−1.05	0	±0
Humanist Platform (PH)	179	0.33	New	0	±0
Blank ballots	836	1.54	+1.54		
**Total**	**54,400**			**27**	**±0**
Valid votes	54,400	98.46	−1.54		
Invalid votes	852	1.54	+1.54		
**Votes cast / turnout**	**55,252**	**65.77**	**+2.01**		
Abstentions	28,750	34.23	−2.01		
**Registered voters**	**84,002**				
Sources
Footnotes: ^{1} People's Alliance results are compared to People's Coalition totals in the 1983 election.; ^{2} United Left results are compared to Communist Party of Spain totals in the 1983 election.

=== Ciudad Real ===
Population: 54,409

← Summary of the 10 June 1987 City Council of Ciudad Real election results →
Parties and alliances	Popular vote			Seats	
Parties and alliances	Votes	%	±pp	Total	+/−
Independent Group of Ciudad Real (AICR)	12,513	48.89	New	**14**	+14
People's Alliance (AP)^{1}	5,001	19.54	−35.58	**5**	−10
Spanish Socialist Workers' Party (PSOE)	4,907	19.17	−19.48	**5**	−5
Democratic and Social Centre (CDS)	1,699	6.64	New	**1**	+1
United Left (IU)^{2}	936	3.66	+0.29	0	±0
Spanish Phalanx of the CNSO (FE–JONS)	172	0.67	−0.63	0	±0
Humanist Platform (PH)	151	0.59	New	0	±0
Blank ballots	214	0.84	+0.84		
**Total**	**25,593**			**25**	**±0**
Valid votes	25,593	98.67	−1.33		
Invalid votes	346	1.33	+1.33		
**Votes cast / turnout**	**25,939**	**67.31**	**+7.04**		
Abstentions	12,600	32.69	−7.04		
**Registered voters**	**38,539**				
Sources
Footnotes: ^{1} People's Alliance results are compared to People's Coalition totals in the 1983 election.; ^{2} United Left results are compared to Communist Party of Spain totals in the 1983 election.

=== Cuenca ===
Population: 41,034

← Summary of the 10 June 1987 City Council of Cuenca election results →
Parties and alliances	Popular vote			Seats	
Parties and alliances	Votes	%	±pp	Total	+/−
People's Alliance (AP)^{1}	10,283	46.07	−0.41	**11**	±0
Spanish Socialist Workers' Party (PSOE)	8,753	39.22	−4.81	**9**	−1
Democratic and Social Centre (CDS)	1,307	5.86	+4.08	**1**	+1
United Left (IU)^{2}	659	2.95	−0.55	0	±0
People's Democratic Party–Independent Farmers' Group (PDP–AAI)	592	2.65	New	0	±0
Liberal Party (PL)	304	1.36	New	0	±0
Humanist Platform (PH)	147	0.66	New	0	±0
Blank ballots	275	1.23	+1.23		
**Total**	**22,320**			**21**	**±0**
Valid votes	22,320	98.72	−1.28		
Invalid votes	289	1.28	+1.28		
**Votes cast / turnout**	**22,609**	**73.07**	**+8.01**		
Abstentions	8,332	26.93	−8.01		
**Registered voters**	**30,941**				
Sources
Footnotes: ^{1} People's Alliance results are compared to People's Coalition totals in the 1983 election.; ^{2} United Left results are compared to Communist Party of Spain totals in the 1983 election.

=== Guadalajara ===
Population: 59,080

← Summary of the 10 June 1987 City Council of Guadalajara election results →
Parties and alliances	Popular vote			Seats	
Parties and alliances	Votes	%	±pp	Total	+/−
Spanish Socialist Workers' Party (PSOE)	12,541	38.80	−11.24	**10**	−4
People's Alliance (AP)^{1}	11,678	36.13	−1.58	**10**	±0
Democratic and Social Centre (CDS)	3,993	12.35	+8.33	**3**	+3
United Left (IU)^{2}	2,380	7.36	+0.67	**2**	+1
People's Democratic Party–Independent Farmers' Group (PDP–AAI)	753	2.33	New	0	±0
Spanish Phalanx of the CNSO (FE–JONS)	194	0.60	New	0	±0
Workers' Party of Spain–Communist Unity (PTE–UC)	179	0.55	New	0	±0
Humanist Platform (PH)	148	0.46	New	0	±0
Blank ballots	457	1.41	+1.41		
**Total**	**32,323**			**25**	**±0**
Valid votes	32,323	98.61	−1.39		
Invalid votes	454	1.39	+1.39		
**Votes cast / turnout**	**32,777**	**76.08**	**+4.10**		
Abstentions	10,305	23.92	−4.10		
**Registered voters**	**43,082**				
Sources
Footnotes: ^{1} People's Alliance results are compared to People's Coalition totals in the 1983 election.; ^{2} United Left results are compared to Communist Party of Spain totals in the 1983 election.

=== Talavera de la Reina ===
Population: 67,311

← Summary of the 10 June 1987 City Council of Talavera de la Reina election results →
Parties and alliances	Popular vote			Seats	
Parties and alliances	Votes	%	±pp	Total	+/−
Spanish Socialist Workers' Party (PSOE)	14,793	43.81	−15.21	**12**	−4
People's Alliance (AP)^{1}	8,563	25.36	−3.13	**6**	−2
Democratic and Social Centre (CDS)	6,349	18.80	+16.90	**5**	+5
United Left (IU)^{2}	2,896	8.58	+1.75	**2**	+1
People's Democratic Party–Independent Farmers' Group (PDP–AAI)	695	2.06	New	0	±0
Humanist Platform (PH)	91	0.27	New	0	±0
Blank ballots	379	1.12	+1.12		
**Total**	**33,766**			**25**	**±0**
Valid votes	33,766	97.50	−2.50		
Invalid votes	867	2.50	+2.50		
**Votes cast / turnout**	**34,633**	**72.63**	**+8.00**		
Abstentions	13,048	27.37	−8.00		
**Registered voters**	**47,681**				
Sources
Footnotes: ^{1} People's Alliance results are compared to People's Coalition totals in the 1983 election.; ^{2} United Left results are compared to Communist Party of Spain totals in the 1983 election.

=== Toledo ===
Population: 58,198

← Summary of the 10 June 1987 City Council of Toledo election results →
Parties and alliances	Popular vote			Seats	
Parties and alliances	Votes	%	±pp	Total	+/−
People's Alliance (AP)^{1}	12,047	42.76	+0.76	**11**	±0
Spanish Socialist Workers' Party (PSOE)	8,858	31.44	−8.17	**9**	−2
United Left (IU)^{2}	3,235	11.48	−0.01	**3**	±0
Democratic and Social Centre (CDS)	2,721	9.66	+7.24	**2**	+2
People's Democratic Party–Independent Farmers' Group (PDP–AAI)	328	1.16	New	0	±0
Independent (INDEP)	282	1.00	New	0	±0
Workers' Party of Spain–Communist Unity (PTE–UC)	176	0.62	New	0	±0
Liberal Party (PL)	130	0.46	New	0	±0
Humanist Platform (PH)	46	0.16	New	0	±0
Blank ballots	353	1.25	+1.25		
**Total**	**28,176**			**25**	**±0**
Valid votes	28,176	98.51	−1.49		
Invalid votes	426	1.49	+1.49		
**Votes cast / turnout**	**28,602**	**68.09**	**+2.31**		
Abstentions	13,402	31.91	−2.31		
**Registered voters**	**42,004**				
Sources
Footnotes: ^{1} People's Alliance results are compared to People's Coalition totals in the 1983 election.; ^{2} United Left results are compared to Communist Party of Spain totals in the 1983 election.

== See also ==
- 1987 Castilian-Manchegan regional election
