= George Sklar =

American playwright, novelist, and screenwriter (1908–1988)

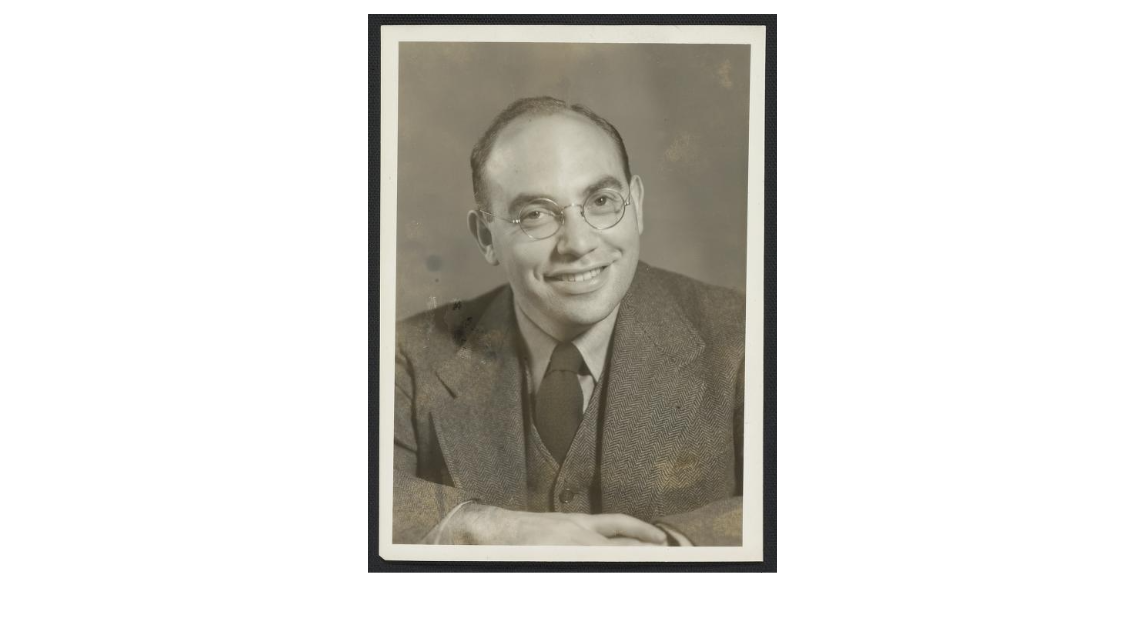
- Born: May 31, 1908; Meriden, Connecticut, United States of America
- Died: May 15, 1988 (aged 79); Los Angeles, California, United States of America
- Education: Bachelor of Arts, Yale University, 1929
- Occupations: playwright, novelist
- Writing career
- Period: 1932—1972

George Sklar (1908–1988) was an American playwright and novelista. A pioneer of 1930's Social Protest Theater, he was a co-founder of the Theater Union, an organization that staged plays for working-class audiences during the Great Depression. Many of Sklar's works emphasized social and political themes such as racial and union conflicts, civil rights, and environmentalism. Sklar was blacklisted from Hollywood in 1949 due to his affiliation with the American Communist Party.

== Early life and education ==
The son of Ezak and Bertha Sklar, the playwright was born on May 31, 1908, in Meriden, Connecticut, and earned a Bachelor of Arts from Yale University in 1929 before pursuing graduate study in drama. On August 22, 1935, Sklar married dancer and choreographer Miriam Blecher, with whom he had three children.

== Career ==
=== Early career and blacklist ===
Sklar began his theatrical career under the New Deal’s Federal Theater Project, writing his first play, Merry-Go-Round, in 1932 with Albert Maltz. During the early 1940s, Sklar also worked as a screenwriter. In 1947, Sklar published his first novel, The Two Worlds of Johnny Truro, a bestseller that was later adapted into a movie by Warner Bros.

The next year, Sklar was blacklisted from Hollywood after refusing to testify before the House Un-American Activities Committee regarding his alleged Communist affiliation. Blecher then became their household’s primary breadwinner, teaching modern dance classes in order to earn the income that her husband could no longer generate in the entertainment industry.

=== Post-blacklist ===
After the blacklist was lifted in the 1960s, Sklar resumed his theatrical career, producing several plays, including And People All Around (1967), which was based on the real-life murders of civil rights workers James Chaney, Andrew Goodman, and Michael Schwerner. Life and Death of an American, the last play ever staged by the Federal Theater Project. Sklar’s final play, Brown Pelican (1972), commented on the planet’s emerging ecological crisis.

In addition to works of theater, Sklar wrote several novels dealing with themes of social justice. These works include The Two Worlds of Johnny Truro (1947), The Promising Young Men (1951), and The Identity of Dr. Frazier (1962).

== Death ==
On May 15, 1988, Sklar died of a heart attack in Los Angeles, California at the age of 79.

== List of works ==
=== Novels ===
- The Two Worlds of Johnny Truro (1947)
- The Promising Young Men (1951)
- The Identity of Dr. Frazier (1962)

=== Plays ===
- Merry-Go-Round (1932); with Albert Maltz
- Peace on Earth (1933)
- Parade (1935) (wrote sketches and lyrics); with Kyle Crichton and Paul Peters
- Stevedore (1934)
- Life and Death of an American (1939)
- Laura (1947); with Vera Caspary (based on the novel Laura by Caspary)
- And People All Around (1967)
- Brown Pelican (1972)

=== Screenplays ===
- Afraid to Talk (1932)
- First Comes Courage (1943); with Lewis Meltzer
