= Communist League (disambiguation) =

Communist League or League of Communists may refer to:

- Communist League, led by Karl Marx and Friedrich Engels
- Communist League of America
- Communist League (Australia) (1972–1976)
- Communist League (Austria)
- Communist League (Brazil)
- Communist League (Denmark)
- League of Communists (Finland)
- Communist League (France, 1930)
- Communist League (France, 1974)
- Communist League (Iceland)
- Communist League of India (Marxist–Leninist)
- Communist League (India, 1931)
- Communist League (India, 1934)
- Communist League (India, 1971)
- Communist League (Japan)
- Communist League of Luxemburg
- Communist League (Nepal)
- Communist League (New Zealand)
- Communist League (West Germany)
- Communist League of West Germany
- Communist League of Xinjiang
- League of Communists of Yugoslavia

== United Kingdom ==
- Communist League (UK, 1919), an anarchist communist group
- Communist League (UK, 1932), the first Trotskyist group in Britain
- Communist League (UK, 1988), part of the Pathfinder tendency
- Communist League (UK, 1990), a split from the Marxist Party
- Communist League of Great Britain, an anti-revisionist group formed in 1975

== See also ==
- Communist Workers League (disambiguation)
- International Communist League (disambiguation)
- Revolutionary Communist League (disambiguation)
- Communist Party (disambiguation)
- Pathfinder tendency
