= PCBS =

PCBS may refer to:

- Palestinian Central Bureau of Statistics
- PCBs, polychlorinated biphenyls
- Wellington Street bus station (originally Perth Central Bus Station)
- PC Building Simulator

== See also ==
- PCB (disambiguation)
