= Communist Party of Spain (disambiguation) =

Communist Party of Spain was founded in 1921 and as of 2017 is the third-largest political party in Spain.

Communist Party of Spain may also refer to:

- Communist Party of the Peoples of Spain
- Communist Party of the Workers of Spain
- Communist Party of Spain (8th and 9th Congresses), a splinter group that existed 1971–1980
- Communist Party of Spain (international), two different groups that existed 1967–1978:
  - Party of Labour of Spain, named Communist Party of Spain (international) from 1967 to 1975
  - Communist Party of Spain (international) (1975)
- Communist Party of Spain (Marxist-Leninist), founded in 2006
- Communist Party of Spain (Marxist-Leninist) (historical), a pro-Maoist and later pro-Albanian group that existed 1964–1992
- Communist Party of Spain (Reconstituted), founded in 1975, a mostly clandestine organization
- Communist Unification Party
- Libertarian Communist Party (Spain)
- Revolutionary Communist Party (Spain)
- Spanish Communist Party, 1920–1921
- Spanish Communist Workers' Party (1973)
- Spanish Communist Workers' Party (1921)
- Workers' Communist Party (Spain)
- Workers' Party of Spain–Communist Unity
