= Communist Party of Germany (1990) =

Minor political party in Germany

Communist Party of Germany Kommunistische Partei Deutschlands
- Chairman: Torsten Schöwitz
- Founded: January 31, 1990; 36 years ago
- Split from: Socialist Unity Party of Germany
- Headquarters: Johannesstraße 156, 99084 Erfurt
- Newspaper: Die Rote Fahne
- Youth wing: Young Communist League of Germany
- Ideology: Communism; Marxism–Leninism; Stalinism; Hard Euroscepticism
- Political position: Far-left

Party flag

Website
- k-p-d.org

The Communist Party of Germany (German: Kommunistische Partei Deutschlands, abbreviated as KPD) is a Marxist-Leninist communist party in Germany. It is one of several parties which claim the KPD name and/or legacy. It was founded in Berlin in 1990. The party is also commonly referred to by the name KPD-Ost (English: KPD-East) to differentiate it from other parties with the same name, most prominently the historical Communist Party of Germany.

== History ==
The KPD, also known as KPD-Ost or KPD (Rote Fahne), was founded in 1990 in the GDR, after the Fall of the Berlin Wall but before the eventual German reunification by members of the Socialist Unity Party of Germany (SED) who opposed the reforms from the party's new leadership and wanted to stay loyal to Marxism-Leninism.

It competed unsuccessfully in the 1990 Volkskammer election, the only multi-party election held in the GDR.

The KPD was exempt from the West German ban on the KPD from 1956, due to a provision in the German reunification treaty which guarantees the continued legality of parties founded in the former GDR. However, this KPD-ban was already circumvented in 1968 with the foundation of a new West German communist party, the German Communist Party (DKP). The KPD and the DKP remain to exist as separate parties and occasionally cooperate politically.

Following Erich Honecker's expulsion from SED, KPD offered him and his wife Margot their party membership, which they gladly accepted.

Today the KPD remains a small party with its main strongholds being in the Neue Länder. It has competed in Bundestag, Landtag and local elections, but so far has only managed to gain one mandate in the city of Zeitz between 2004 and 2014. In 2019, the party stood candidates in the state elections in Saxony and Thuringia.

In 2002, the KPD founded its youth wing, the Young Communist League of Germany.

In 2020, KPD member Siegfried Kutschick, elected to the Zeitz city council under the Wir für unsere Stadt banner, was expelled from the party for joining the Alternative for Germany (AfD) council caucus. After a week of protests from the KPD and other leftwing organizations, Kutschick reconsidered and left the AfD caucus. Nevertheless Kutschick was expelled from the KPD.

== Ideology ==
The party upholds a strict anti-revisionist Marxist-Leninist line, and states that it "consistently fights revisionism, opportunism and its main form, anti-Stalinism." It recognizes the German Democratic Republic (DDR), the Union of Soviet Socialist Republics (USSR), especially during the leadership of Stalin, and other former Soviet allied states as examples of real existing socialism. It also holds a positive view on the Democratic People's Republic of Korea, its leadership, both Kim Jong-il and his successor Kim Jong-un, and the leading ideologies of the nation, being Juche and Songun. On the subject of the first leader of the state, Kim Il-sung, it claims that he was "a great politician who acquired himself big merits in the modern political history and left behind definite traces".

Previously supportive of the Initiative of Communist and Workers' Parties, KPD declared their support for the European Communist Action led by the Communist Party of Greece (KKE) after its dissolution. It also declared its incompatibility with the World Anti-Imperialist Platform which includes a couple of former INITIATIVE members like the Hungarian Workers' Party and the Communist Party in Italy. They explained this decision by claiming that the WAP defamed the KKE and the inclusion of the United Socialist Party of Venezuela after the intervention of the Communist Party of Venezuela.

== Famous members ==
Despite being a small party, it managed to attract a number of prominent members, mostly those from the former leadership of the Socialist Unity Party (SED). Both Erich Honecker and his wife Margot became members of the KPD after being expelled from the reformed SED in 1990, Margot Honecker even becoming an honorary member.

Irma Thälmann, the daughter of Ernst Thälmann, became a member of the KPD after leaving the Party of Democratic Socialism, due to the re-evaluation of her father's legacy by the party. She was a candidate for the KPD at the 1994 Bundestag election for the district of Berlin-Lichtenberg, gaining 266 votes (0.17%).

== Electoral history ==
Election	Year	Votes	%	Seats
Volkskammer (DDR)	1990	8,819	0.1%	0
Municipal elections in East-Berlin	1990	3,255	0.2%	0
Landtag Brandenburg	1994	174 (Erststimme)	0%	0
Bundestag	1994	426 (Erststimme)	0%	0
Landtag Saxony	1999	1,814	0.1%	0
Bundestag	2002	1,624 (686 Erststimmen)	0.0%	0
Municipal elections in Zeitz	2004	505	1.9%	1
Landtag Thuringia	2004	1,842	0.2%	0
Landtag Saxony-Anhalt	2006	957 (together with the DKP) (757 Erststimmen)	0.1%	0
Municipal elections in Zeitz	2009	451	1.7%	1
Landtag Saxony-Anhalt	2011	1,653	0.2%	0
Municipal elections in Zeitz	2014	393	1.4%	0
Landtag Thuringia	2014	1,177	0.1%	0
Landtag Saxony	2019	1,955	0.1%	0
Landtag Thuringia	2019	756	0.1%	0
Landtag Mecklenburg-Vorpommern	2026	818	0.1%	0

== See also ==
- Communist Party of Germany (disambiguation)
- Historical, original KPD, founded in 1919
