= Communist Party of Upper Silesia =

Communist Party of Upper Silesia Komunistyczna Partia Górnego Śląska Kommunistische Partei Oberschlesiens
- Abbreviation: KPGŚ
- Founded: November 7 1920
- Dissolved: 1933 in Germany; 1938 in Poland
- Merger of: KPGŚ; KPD; USPD
- Membership: ~5,600
- Ideology: Communism; Marxism-Leninism; Silesian autonomism
- Political position: Left-wing to Far-Left
- International affiliation: Comintern

The Communist Party of Upper Silesia (Polish: Komunistyczna Partia Górnego Śląska, KPGŚ; German: Kommunistische Partei Oberschlesiens) was a regional communist organisation in Upper Silesia, active around late 1920. It formed through a merger in November 1920 of the Communist Party of Silesian Land (which had split from the Polish Socialist Party in September 1920) with Silesian branches of the German Communist Party (KPD) and the Independent Social Democratic Party of Germany (USPD).

== Background ==
Following the end of World War I, Upper Silesia was marked by a complex interplay of national tensions, social discontent, and political radicalism. The collapse of empires and the formation of new states in Central Europe, together with the pronounced economic inequalities in the industrially developed Upper Silesian region, created fertile ground for left-wing movements. In December 1918 a group of German leftists, workers and soldiers’ councils in Bytom formed a group calling itself the Communist Party of Upper Silesia (Związek Spartakusa), under the chairmanship of Anton Jadasch. However, from the outset the organisation operated under strong influence from the German Communist Party (KPD). In 1919–1920 tensions grew between efforts to advance social and class demands (e.g. strikes, radical labour organisation) on one side, and competing strong nationalist claims (both Polish and German) on the other. Communist activists sought to transcend these national divides, promoting class solidarity and rejecting national partisanship, advocating in some organs for the abolition of borders and cooperation among workers regardless of nationality. In September 1920, a faction broke away from the Polish Socialist Party (PPS) in the Silesian Voivodeship, forming the Communist Party of Silesian Land (Komunistyczna Partia Ziem Śląskich, KPZŚ). In November 1920, this body merged with branches of the KPD and the Independent Social Democratic Party of Germany (USPD) active in Upper Silesia to formalise the Communist Party of Upper Silesia (Kommunistische Partei Oberschlesiens-Komunistyczna Partia Górnego Śląska), with its own central committee yet functioning largely as a regional district of the German party. However, by 1921 the plebiscite over the national affiliation of Upper Silesia, together with the rising strength of nationalist mobilisation (especially Polish uprisings), significantly weakened the communists’ position. Many workers who might have sympathised with their class-oriented platform gravitated instead toward nationalist causes. After the partition of the region in 1922, the communist organisations in the Polish-controlled part were absorbed into the Communist Party of Poland, and those in the German part into the KPD.

== Activities ==
One of the party's most ambitious goals was the establishment of a Upper Silesian Soviet Republic (Górnośląska Republika Rad), modelled after the Soviet system in Russia. This vision was articulated in a manifesto published in November 1920, which called for the creation of a workers' state in Upper Silesia. The party also advocated for the boycott of the 1921 plebiscite, arguing that national borders should not determine the fate of the working class. (Note: "On June 29 [1921], 2nd Lt. Shilling at the head of a rebellious 'unit with purely Bolshevik intentions' attacked Tworóg, the staging area of the Northern Group command.")

Despite these efforts, KPGŚ faced significant challenges. The region's strong nationalist sentiments and the presence of competing political ideologies limited the party's influence. Additionally, the Polish government's repression of communist activities further hindered the party's operations. In 1922, following the partition of Upper Silesia, KPGŚ split, with the German section joining the Communist Party of Germany (KPD) and the Polish section aligning with the Communist Party of Poland (KPP).

== Aftermath ==
The party's activities gradually declined due to internal divisions and external pressures. In Germany, KPGŚ effectively ceased operations in 1933 after the rise of the Nazi regime. In Poland, the party was formally dissolved in 1938 following the dissolution of the KPP by the Comintern.
