= Afraid to Talk =

1932 film directed by Edward L. Cahn

- Directed by: Edward L. Cahn
- Screenplay by: Tom Reed
- Based on: Merry-Go-Round; 1930 play by: Albert Maltz; George Sklar
- Produced by: Carl Laemmle, Jr.
- Starring: Eric Linden; Sidney Fox; Tully Marshall; Louis Calhern; George Meeker; Robert Warwick
- Cinematography: Karl Freund
- Edited by: Milton Carruth
- Music by: James Dietrich
- Production company: Universal Pictures
- Distributed by: Universal Pictures
- Release date: December 1, 1932
- Running time: 69 minutes
- Country: United States
- Language: English

Afraid to Talk is a 1932 American pre-Code drama film directed by Edward L. Cahn with a screenplay written by Tom Reed based on the 1930 play Merry-Go-Round by Albert Maltz and George Sklar. The film stars Eric Linden, Sidney Fox, Tully Marshall, Louis Calhern, George Meeker and Robert Warwick. The film was released on December 1, 1932, by Universal Pictures.

== Plot ==
In an unnamed metropolitan city during the Depression, corrupt mayor Billy Manning is running for re-election, and his political allies in the party machine do their best to burnish his public image.

When a local mobster is shot in his hotel room by a speakeasy owner/racketeer named Jig Skelli the crime is witnessed by bellhop Eddie Martin, who had been waiting on him. The police take Martin into custody, and A.D.A. John Wade, part of the Mayor's clique, pressures Martin to name Jig as the killer, going as far as to prevent his wife Peggy from warning him other thugs have threatened the couple with death if they testify. Martin's name is released to the media as the prime witness. Jig's brother Joe takes a private meeting with court officials, warning them he has documents from the dead mobster that detail all the corrupt activities of the Mayor's cronies, including their interests with the mob, and to protect their interests, wrangle the charges to be dropped and Jig to be freed. Eddie and Peggy are promised a protective move to New York to keep them safe from retaliation.

Associates of Jig Skelli celebrate his release by shooting up the neighborhood, and an innocent child is killed in the gunfire. Since they cannot reindict Jig lest he reveal his secrets, the Mayor's clique take advantage of circumstantial evidence to present an alternate theory that Eddie was the killer. He is arrested before he and his wife's previously promised move, and violently interrogated in the hope of pressuring a forced confession. A doctor on scene insists if he is not taken to hospital, Eddie will die, and A.D.A. Wade reluctantly lets him be taken there to recuperate.

In hospital, a sympathetic doctor sneaks a progressive lawyer into Eddie's room, and enough evidence is gathered that could counter the city's case against him. In desperation, the clique arranges for Eddie to be killed in a manufactured hanging. However, Police Commissioner Garvey, who has quit in protest of the frame-up, manages to reach the detention facility in time to save Eddie's life.

The press reveals that the criminal activities of the Mayor and his cronies have been exposed; the party chairman and A.D.A. Hyde have managed to keep themselves out of records of these events, allowing them to keep their jobs and reputations. However, Hyde has been wildcatting with Jig Skelli's girlfriend Marge Winters, and is killed by the Skellis. When asked for a quote by reporters, the party chair defends Hyde's reputation as a prosecutor, and wonders where another man of integrity to lead the city will be found.

== Cast ==
- Eric Linden as Eddie Martin
- Sidney Fox as Peggy Martin
- Tully Marshall as District Attorney. Anderson
- Louis Calhern as Asst. District Attorney John Wade
- George Meeker as Lenny Collins
- Robert Warwick as Jake Stranskey
- Berton Churchill as Mayor William 'Billy' Manning
- Edward Arnold as Jig Skelli
- Mayo Methot as Marge Winters
- Matt McHugh as Joe Skelli
- Thomas E. Jackson as Deputy Benchley
- Frank Sheridan as Police Commissioner Garvey
- Ian Maclaren as Chief Frank Hyers
- Gustav von Seyffertitz as Attorney Harry Berger
- Reginald Barlow as Judge MacMurray
- Edward Martindel as Mayor Jamison
- Joyce Compton as Alice
- John Ince as Bill
- George Chandler as Pete
- Arthur Housman as Archie
