= Tunji Otegbeye =

Nigerian politician, trade unionist and doctor

Jeremiah Olatunji Otegbeye (14 July 1925 – 9 October 2009) was a Nigerian politician, trade unionist and medical doctor. Otegbeye hailed from the Yewa community.

== Early life and career ==
Otegbeye was born in Ilaro, where he attended the Christ Church Primary School. Between 1942 and 1947 he studied at the Government College in Ibadan. In 1948 he began studying medicine at University College Ibadan, and went on to complete his education in London. In London he was active in the Nigerian Union and the West African Students' Union, and was a frequent speaker at the Hyde Park Speakers Corner.

Upon his return to Nigeria in 1957, Otegbeye participated in the struggle for Nigerian independence. He became active in the Nigerian Youth Congress, founded in 1960. He rapidly became the president of the NYC, and under his leadership the movement became more radical. Otegbeye led a youth and students protest against the Anglo-Nigerian Defense Pact on 28 November 1960, during which the House of Representatives was stormed. He was arrested afterwards along with other youth leaders. He was also charged with and convicted for (along with seven colleagues) having led the 15 February 1961 riots that followed the killing of Patrice Lumumba.

Otegbeye founded a private medical practice in Lagos in 1960, the Ireti Hospital.

== Political career ==
In 1963, he founded the Socialist Workers and Farmers Party of Nigeria (SWAFP), a Marxist-Leninist political party. At the time of the Biafra War, during which relations between the Soviet Union and the Federal Military Government gradually improved, Otegbeye's role in Nigerian politics change as he played the role of a goodwill ambassador in the informal diplomacy between the two states. However, he and S. O. Martins (of the Nigerian-Soviet Friendship Society) were arrested in June 1969 as they returned from having attended the International Meeting of Communist and Workers Parties in Moscow. The arrest caused a diplomatic stir, and the Soviet ambassador was recalled twice to Moscow for consultations. The Soviet Deputy Foreign Minister Leonid Ilichev made a visit to Lagos, after which Otegbeye was released. Otegbeye was again arrested in early 1972, and sentenced to six weeks' imprisonment.

Otegbeye was a member of the 1977 Constituent Assembly.

He contested the 1979 Ogun state gubernatorial primaries of the Unity Party of Nigeria along with chief Bisi Onabanjo.

== Later life ==
During the perestroika years, Otegbeye fell out of grace with the Soviet leadership. Likewise, he began to distance himself from Moscow. Otegbeye began moving toward conservative positions and became a leading figure of the Yoruba Council of Elders. During the Sani Abacha regime, Otegbeye was active in the National Democratic Coalition (NADECO).

Tunji Otegbeye died in Ilaro in 2009. After his death, many prominent personalities paid tribute to him, including former president Olusegun Obasanjo and the governors of the Ogun, Edo and Ekiti states.
