= Communist Party of Great Britain (disambiguation) =

The Communist Party of Great Britain (CPGB) was a political party that existed from 1920 to 1991.

Communist Party of Great Britain or Communist Party of Britain may also refer to:

- Communist Unity Group, an early communist group formed in January 1919 which joined the CPGB in 1920
- Communist Party of Britain (CPB), formed in 1988, which considers itself to be the legal continuation of the CPGB
- Communist Party (British Section of the Third International), active during 1920 and led by Sylvia Pankhurst
- Communist Party of Great Britain (Provisional Central Committee) (CPGB-PCC), founded in 1989 but originally a Leninist faction within the CPGB
- Communist Party of Britain (Marxist–Leninist) (CPB-ML), an anti-revisionist group which split from the CPGB in 1968
- Communist Party of Great Britain (Marxist–Leninist) (CPGB-ML), an anti-revisionist group which split from the Socialist Labour Party in 2004
- Communist Party of South Wales and the West of England
- Communist Workers' Party, a left communist group active during the early 1920s
- New Communist Party of Britain, an anti-revisionist group formed in 1977
- Revolutionary Communist Party (UK, 1944), a Trotskyist group which existed from 1944 to 1949
- Revolutionary Communist Party (UK, 1977), a Trotskyist group formed in 1977 and disbanded in 1996
- Revolutionary Communist Party of Britain (Marxist–Leninist), an anti-revisionist group formed in 1979, previously Maoist

== See also ==
- Revolutionary Communist Party (disambiguation)
