= Communist Party of Albania =

Communist Party of Albania may refer to:

- Party of Labour of Albania (or Albanian Workers' Party), founded as the Communist Party of Albania
- Communist Party of Albania (1991)
- Communist Party of Albania 8 November
- Communist Reconstruction Party, in Albania
- Party of United Communists of Albania
