= Revolutionary Communist Organisation =

Revolutionary Communist Organisation can refer to:

- Revolutionary Communist Organisation (Austria), linked to Revolutionary Workers League (Oehlerite)
- Revolutionary Communist Organisation, Nepal

== See also ==
- Revolutionary Communist Party (disambiguation)
