= PCR =

PCR or pcr may refer to:

== Science and medicine ==
- Pathologic complete response (pCR), in neoadjuvant therapy
- Polymerase chain reaction
  - COVID-19 testing, often performed using the polymerase chain reaction method
- Phosphocreatine, a phosphorylated creatine molecule
- Principal component regression, a statistical technique
- Protein/creatinine ratio, in urine

== Technology ==
- Passport Carrier Release, telecommunications software
- Peak cell rate, on ATM networks
- Platform Configuration Register, a Trusted Execution Technology implemented using a TPM
- Program clock reference, in MPEG transport streams
- XM PCR, a satellite receiver

== Political parties ==
- Parti Communiste Réunionnais or Communist Party of Réunion
- Partido Comunista Revolucionário or Revolutionary Communist Party
- Partido Cívico Renovador or Civic Renovation Party, Dominican Republic
- Partidul Comunist Român or Romanian Communist Party

== Other uses ==
- Put/call ratio, in finance
- Amdo Tibetan (ISO 639 code pcr), a language
- Germán Olano Airport (IATA code PCR), Colombia
- Palestinian Center for Rapprochement between Peoples, Palestine
- Pancritical rationalism, a development of critical rationalism and panrationalism
- Paul Cruickshank Racing, an Australian motor racing team
- Police control room, an emergency control centre
- Practical Chinese Reader, a textbook
- Production control room, of a television studio
- Princess Connect! Re:Dive, a video game
- Police of the Czech Republic
- Pavement Classification Rating
- Post-consumer resin, a blend of reclaimed natural HDPE and virgin resin

== See also ==
- Partido Comunista Revolucionario (disambiguation)
