= Communist Labor Party =

Communist Labor Party may refer to:

- Communist Labor Party of America, founded in 1919, merged with the Communist Party of America (Minority Faction) to form the United Communist Party in 1920
- Communist Labor Party of North America, an anti-revisionist communist group in the 1970s
- Communist Labour Party of Turkey
- Communist Labour Party of Turkey/Leninist

== See also ==
- Communist Party of Labour in the Dominican Republic
