= Worker-Communist Party =

There are some Iranian and Iraqi parties known as Worker-Communist Parties. They all originate from the WCPIran.

- Left Worker-communist Party of Iraq
- Leftist Worker-Communist Party of Iraq
- Worker-communist Party of Iran
- Worker-communist Party of Iran – Hekmatist
- Worker-communist Party of Iraq
- Worker-communist Party of Kurdistan

== See also ==
- Workers Communist Party
- Communist Workers Party
