= Palestinian Communist Party =

The Palestinian Communist Party may refer to:

- Socialist Workers Party (Mandatory Palestine) of 1919 which was a precursor to
  - Palestinian Communist Party (1922)
  - Communist Party of Palestine, which existed from 1922 to 1923
    - Palestine Communist Party, formed in 1923 by the merger of the first two parties
- Palestinian Communist Party founded in 1982 and now known as the Palestinian People's Party
  - Palestinian Communist Party (1991), a hardline faction which split from the Palestinian People's Party
  - Revolutionary Palestinian Communist Party, a hardline faction that split in 1982. They are based in Syria and are a founding member of the Alliance of Palestinian Forces

== See also ==
- Palestinian Communist Workers Party
