= International Communist League =

International Communist League may refer to:

- Internationalist Communist League (Brazil), predecessor of the Communist League
- International Communist League (Fourth Internationalist), also known as the Spartacist League
- International Communist League (Mexico), which joined the Workers' Revolutionary Party in 1976
- Internationalist Communist League (Portugal)
- International Communist League (Vietnam), active from 1944 until about 1946
- International-Communist League, a short-lived alliance of British groups in the mid-1970s
- International Left Opposition, led by Trotsky from 1933 until 1936 (named International Communist League from 1933 until 1936)
- Pathfinder tendency, sometimes referred to as the International Communist League

== See also ==
- Communist League (disambiguation)
- ICL (disambiguation)
