= PCB =

PCB may refer to:

== Science and technology ==
- Polychlorinated biphenyl, an organic chlorine compound, now recognized as an environmental toxin and classified as a persistent organic pollutant
- Printed circuit board, a board used in electronics
- Plenum chamber burning, in some jet engines
- Papillary carcinomas of the breast, rare forms of the breast cancers

=== Computing ===
- PCB (software), software to design printed circuit boards
- PCBoard, bulletin board software for MS-DOS
- Process control block, an operating system data structure
- Precompiled Binary

== Organizations ==
=== Political parties ===
- Bolshevik Communist Party (Spanish: Partido Comunista Bolchevique), a Mexican political party in the 1960s
- Communist Party of Belgium (French: Parti Communiste de Belgique), until splitting in 1989
  - Communist Party of Belgium (1989)(French: Parti Communiste de Belgique), one of the successors to that party
- Communist Party of Bolivia (Spanish: Partido Comunista de Bolivia)
- Brazilian Communist Party (Portuguese: Partido Comunista Brasileiro)

=== Other organizations ===
- Pacific Coast Borax Company, an American mining company
- Pakistan Cricket Board, national regulatory board for cricket in Pakistan
- PCB Piezotronics, a manufacturer of piezoelectric sensors
- Pharmacy Council of Bangladesh
- Police Complaints Board, in England and Wales

== Places ==
- Panama City Beach, Florida, United States
- Pondok Cabe Airport (IATA code), Indonesia

== Other uses ==
- Penetration-cum-blast, ammunition type for the Arjun tank's 120mm cannon
- Pablo Carreño Busta, Spanish tennis player
- Perfect Cherry Blossom, the seventh official game in the Japanese Touhou series by ZUN
- Public call box, a telephone booth
- PCB, a bible translation into Persian from 1995
