= Socialist Workers and Farmers Party of Nigeria =

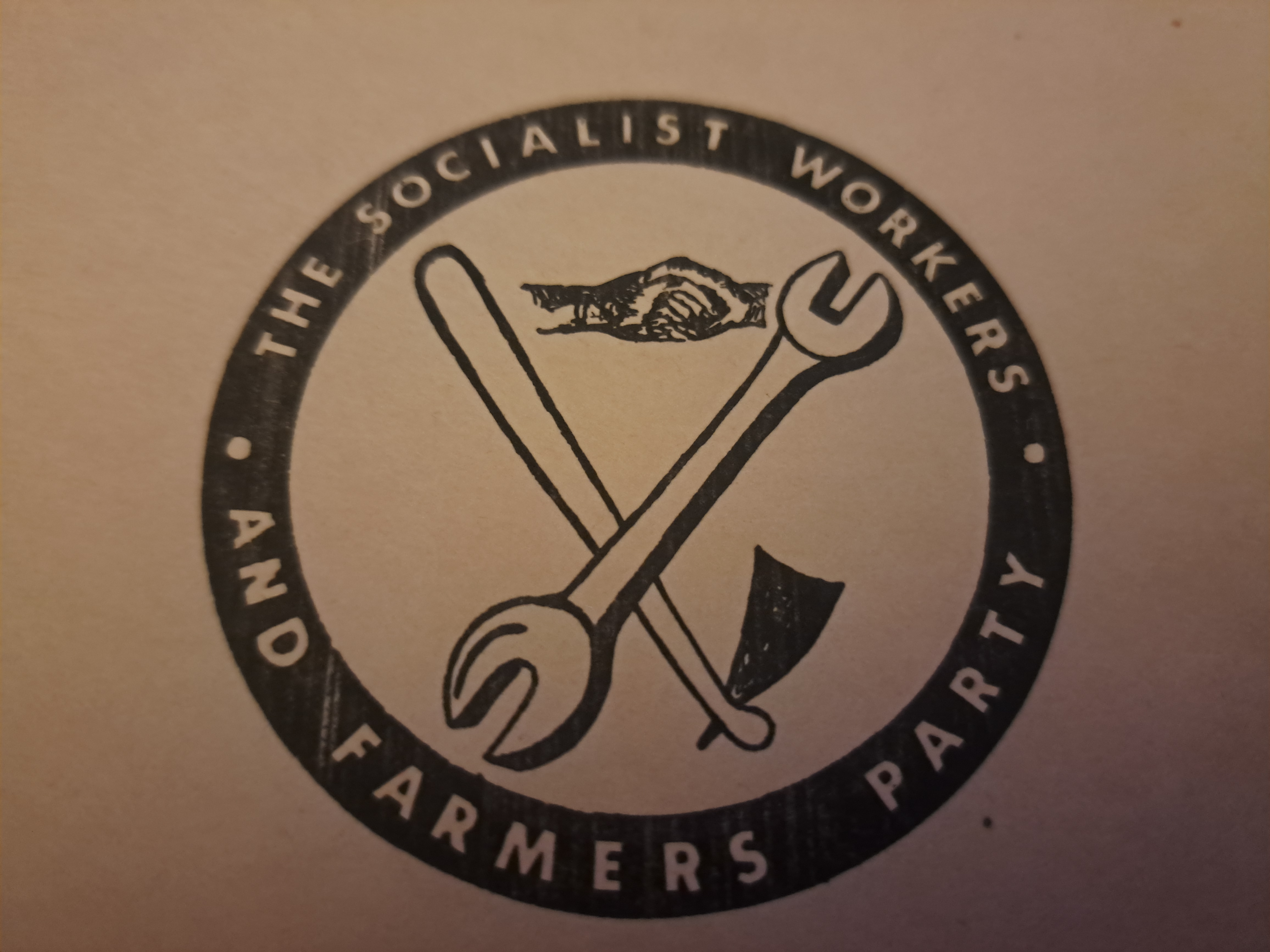
- Founder: Tunji Otegbeye
- Founded: 1963
- Dissolved: 1966 (banned)
- Headquarters: Lagos
- Newspaper: Advance
- Ideology: Communism; Marxism-Leninism

Socialist Workers and Farmers Party of Nigeria was a political party in Nigeria. Founded in 1963, its leaders included Dr. Tunji Otegbeye, Eskor Toyo, Wahab Goodluck, Kunle Oyero, Uche Chukwumerije, Bassey and Fatogun. The SWFPN, formed by elements from the Nigerian Youth Congress and the leadership of the Nigeria Trade Union Congress, was registered in 1964.

SWFPN was primarily a Nigerian party but strongly inclined towards the ideological position of the Marxist party and politically close to the Soviet Union. It published Advance, and managed Socialist Publishing House and Edo Printers before it was banned in 1966.
