= Libertarian Communist Party =

Libertarian Communist Party could refer to:

- Libertarian Communist Party (Brazil)
- Libertarian Communist Party (Spain)
