= Communist Party of Silesian Land =

Former political party in Poland operating in 1920

- Founded: 1920
- Dissolved: 1920
- Split from: Polish Socialist Party
- Succeeded by: Communist Party of Upper Silesia
- Ideology: Communism
- Political position: Far-left

The Communist Party of Silesian Land (Polish: Komunistyczna Partia Ziemi Śląskiej, KPZŚ) was a communist party that operated in the Silesian Voivodeship, Poland in 1920.

== History ==
The Communist Party of Silesian Land was formed in September 1920, by splitting from the Polish Socialist Party. In November 1920, it joined with the Silesian Voivodeship branches of the Communist Party of Germany and the Independent Social Democratic Party of Germany, forming the Communist Party of Upper Silesia.
