= Communist Party of Namibia =

Communist Party of Namibia may refer to:

- Communist Party of Namibia (1981-1989), a political party of Namibia prior to independence which eventually united with the United Democratic Front (UDF)
- Communist Party of Namibia (2009), a political party in Namibia reformed in 2009
