= New Communist Party =

New Communist Party may refer to:

- New Communist Party of Britain
- New Communist Party of the Netherlands
- New Communist Party of Georgia
- New Communist Party of Yugoslavia
