= Communist Reconstruction Party =

- Leader: Rasi Brahimit (1998–1999)
- Founded: 1998
- Dissolved: 1999
- Merged into: Party of United Communists of Albania
- Ideology: Communism
- Political position: Far-left

Communist Reconstruction Party (in Albanian: Partia Komuniste e Rindertuar) was a communist party in Albania led by Rasi Brahimit. The party was legalized in 1998, the second communist party that was legally registered post-1991. On 5 June 1999 the party merged into the Party of United Communists of Albania (PKBSH).
