= Communist Revolution Committee for the Formation of the Marxist–Leninist Party =

The "Communist Revolution" Committee for the Formation of the Marxist-Leninist Party (in Portuguese: Comité "Revolução Comunista" pela formação do Partido Marxista-Leninista) was a Portuguese left-wing group, one of several dissident communist groupings that emerged at the time of the Carnation Revolution. It existed around 1975-1976.

CRCFPML published Voz da Revolução.
