= Nigerian Youth Congress =

The Nigerian Youth Congress was a radical left leaning organization founded in 1960. It was anterior organization to two left leaning and socialist parties formed in the First Republic.

The political viewpoints of Nigerian Youth Congress (NYC) were similar to those of the Zikist Vanguard group and the Socialist Workers and Farmers Party and radicals skeptical about the entrepreneurial politics within NCNC and Action Group found NYC a platform to express their views. Members of the Zikist political outlook and radical socialist oriented groups occupied leadership positions within the NYC.

== Activities ==
Founded in 1960, the Nigerian Youth Congress was an anti-regionalism, labour and socialist oriented organization with a "progressive" ideology. Apart from Tunji Otegbeye, its principal promoter, NYC found support among labour leaders such as Wahab Goodluck and Samuel Bassey. It held its first conference in 1961 and was invited to attend the All-African Peoples' Conference held that same year, both events got the congress to be noticed.

NYC formed a joint action committee with other radical factions within the labour unions and the Nigerian Union of Student to organize protests and write pamphlets calling attention to their concerns and to promote their socialist ideologies. In 1961, organized protest in front of two foreign embassies in Lagos after the death of Patrice Lumumba was instrumental to the withdrawal of Nigeria from the Anglo-Nigeria Defense Pact. In 1964, NYC joined like minded groups to organize a general workers strike.

Beginning in 1963, the organization began to fracture. A crisis arose within the labour movement and members split off into two factions. Eskor Toyo, NYC secretary initiated reconciliation moves which culminated in a meeting of both factions and other left leaning organizations. The outcome of the meeting led to the creation of the Socialist Workers and Farmers Party. However, when the working committee to organize the party was formed, majority of its members came from one of the factions, those led by Otegbeye, Goodluck and Bassey factions. This further led to a crisis within the youth congress as Toyo supported the other faction led by Imoudu. The congress did not survive the First Republic.

== Views ==
- Unitary system of government
- Socialist perspective to solve political and economic problems
- Foreign policy based on the ideals espoused by Kwame Nkrumah
