= Palestinian Communist Workers Party =

Political party of Palestine

The Palestinian Communist Workers Party (Arabic: حزب العمال الشيوعي الفلسطيني) was a Palestinian communist party. The party was formed in Beirut in 1978, by Palestinian sympathizers of the Egyptian Communist Workers Party.

The activity of the party was largely confined to Lebanon. Members included Dr. Samir Berquaoui, Zainab Algenimi, Dr. Samir Huleileh, Muhannad Abdel Hamid, Imad Rahaimh, Rib Salem, Nasri Abdul Rahman and Hani Al-Masri. The party was dissolved in the early 1990s.

Tariq al-Intisar (طريق الانتصار) was the organ of the party.
