= Jewish Communist Party =

Jewish Communist Party may refer to:

- Jewish Communist Party — Poalei Zion, section of the Palestine Communist Party founded in Palestine 1919
- Jewish Communist Party (Poalei Zion) founded in Soviet Russia in 1919
- Jewish Communist Labour Party (Poalei Zion) founded in the Russian Empire in 1906
- Jewish Communist Party of Austria founded in 1919
- Jewish Communist Union (Poalei Zion) (the Komverband) an international federation of parties founded in 1921
- Jewish Communist Party in the Czechoslovak Republic, political party in Czechoslovakia

== See also ==
- Yevsektsiya - the Jewish Section of the Communist Party of the Soviet Union.
- Hebrew Communists, short-lived political party in Mandatory Palestine and Israel
- Jewish Bolshevism, antisemitic and anti-communist conspiracy theory
