= Communist Party USA (disambiguation) =

The Communist Party USA (CPUSA) is a communist political party in the United States.

Political parties with similar names include:

- American Communist Party (2024) (ACP), a conservative communist organization
- Communist Labor Party of America (CLPA), the smaller of two organizations which formed in 1919 and merged in 1921 into CPUSA
- Communist Party of America (CPA), the larger of two organizations which formed in 1919 and merged in 1921 into CPUSA
- Communist Party USA (Marxist–Leninist) (CPUSA(ML)), a defunct Maoist organization
- Communist Party USA (Opposition) (CPO), a defunct Bukharinist organization
- Communist Party USA (Provisional) (CPUSA(P)), a clandestine communist organization
- Revolutionary Communist Party, USA (RCP), a Marxist–Leninist–Maoist organization
- Revolutionary Communists of America (RCA), a Trotskyist organization
