= Communist Party of the Soviet Union (disambiguation) =

The Communist Party of the Soviet Union was the founding and ruling political party of the Soviet Union. Communist Party of the Soviet Union may also refer to:

- Union of Communist Parties – Communist Party of the Soviet Union, a group of parties formed in 1993
- Communist Party of the Soviet Union (2001), a Russian party split from the Union of Communist Parties
