= Indian Confederation of Labour =

Trade Union

The Indian Confederation of Labour is a small trade union federation in India. ICL was affiliated with the World Confederation of Labour. The 2006 founding congress of the International Trade Union Confederation (ITUC) granted ICL status as an Associated Organization, but this status was revoked by the ITUC General Council in 2008.
