= Communist Party of the Republic of Tatarstan =

Communist Party of the Republic of Tatarstan Татарстан Республикасы коммунистлар партиясе
- Leader: Alexander Saly
- Founded: 14 December 1991
- Dissolved: 1 April 2002
- Succeeded by: Communist Party of the Russian Federation
- Ideology: Communism
- Political position: Far-left

Website
- kprt.narod.ru

The Communist Party of the Republic of Tatarstan (Note: Tatar: Татарстан Республикасы коммунистлар партиясе, Tatarstan Respublikası kommunistlar partiyase; Russian: Коммунистическая партия Республики Татарстан, romanized: Kommunisticheskaya partiya Respubliki Tatarstan) was a communist political party that existed from 1991 to 2002 in Tatarstan, nowadays a constituent republic of Russia, but at that time it was a self-proclaimed sovereign republic.

The party was founded from the Tatar ASSR department of the Communist Party of the Soviet Union in December 1991. In 2002, it joined the Communist Party of the Russian Federation as a regional branch.

The CPRT was affiliated to the Union of Communist Parties - Communist Party of the Soviet Union (UCP-CPSU).

During Soviet times, one of the leaders of the Communist Party of the Tatar Autonomous Soviet Socialist Republic was Fikryat Tabeyev, who after his resignation served as USSR's ambassador to Afghanistan. He was followed by Rashid Musin, Gumer Usmanov, and Mintimer Shaimiyev.

== History ==
=== Organization of Communists of the Republic of Tatarstan ===
On 20 November 1991, the first meeting of the organizing committee of the initiative group for the re-establishment of the communist organization of the Republic of Tatarstan took place in Kazan.

The Organization of Communists of the Republic of Tatarstan (OCRT) was founded on 15 December 1991 in Kazan. The organization's core consisted of rank-and-file communists of the CPSU who refused to accept the ban on the party, the restoration of capitalism, and the collapse of the USSR. Many of the OCRT's sub-organizations were created as continuations of the CPSU's sub-organizations. On 14 February 1992, the OCRT was registered with the Ministry of Justice of Tatarstan.

On 17 June 1992, the second stage of the initiative conference of the OCRT was held, at which the republican committee (rekom) of the OCRT consisting of 19 people was elected.

From its founding, the organization began mass propaganda among the population, campaigning against unpopular reforms and warning of impending poverty, unemployment, and the disenfranchisement of workers. The OCRT received an influx of members, mainly among the elderly and war veterans.

=== Formation into a party ===
As the organization grew in popularity, the Third Conference of the OCRT, held on 20 November 1993 in Naberezhnye Chelny, decided to transform the Organization into the Communist Party of the Republic of Tatarstan (CPRT).

The First Congress of the CPRT was held on 24-25 June 1994 in Kazan. The Congress adopted the CPRT's program.

=== Unification with the CPRF ===
The Third Congress of the CPRT was held on 15-16 February 1997. The Congress approved a policy of gradual rapprochement with the Communist Party of the Russian Federation (CPRF), up to and including joining "the CPRF with its own Charter and Program." The decision was reached by a narrow margin. Some party members, opposed to unification with the CPRF, decided to split, forming the Communist Party (Bolsheviks) of the Republic of Tatarstan.

Due to the split and the decision to join the CPRF, a new party charter was adopted at the Fifth Congress of the CPRT on 21 February 1998, and registered by the State Registration Chamber under the Ministry of Justice of Tatarstan on 25 March 1998. On 25 March 1999, the CPRT was re-registered as the Republican Political Public Organization "Communist Party of the Republic of Tatarstan" (RPPO "CPRT"), and on 1 April 2002, as the Tatarstan Regional Branch of the Political Party "Communist Party of the Russian Federation" (TRB "CPRF"). In accordance with the Federal Law "On Political Parties", the branch adopted the Charter of the CPRF.

The process of the CPRT's merging into the CPRF coincided with the de-sovereignization of Tatarstan. Even after the split, the CPRT retained a large number of communists with a "national orientation": some active CPRT members supported the sovereignty of Tatarstan and, consequently, the sovereignty of their organization vis-à-vis the Moscow leadership.
