= Faroese Communist Party =

Faroese Communist Party Kommunistiski flokkur Føroya
- Founded: 1975
- Dissolved: 1993
- Headquarters: Tórshavn
- Ideology: Communism; Marxism-Leninism
- Political position: Far-left

The Faroese Communist Party (Faroese: Kommunistiski flokkur Føroya) was founded at a conference in Tórshavn 14th-15 June 1975. In 1974 a communist group had started organizing in the Faroe Islands which preceded the foundation conference. The chairman of KFF used to be Egon Thomsen and the party secretary Tórður Jóansson. Between 1975 and 1978 the publication of the KFF was Tíðin, from 1983 to 1993 the publication was Fríu Føroyar. The KFF enjoyed relations with the Communist Party of Denmark (DKP), but was not a section of the party. The party ceased activity in 1993.
