= Revolutionary Communist Group =

Revolutionary Communist Group is the name of several political parties:

- Revolutionary Communist Group of Colombia
- Revolutionary Communist Group (Lebanon)
- Revolutionary Communist Group (UK)

== See also ==
- Revolutionary Communist League (disambiguation)
- Revolutionary Communist Party (disambiguation)
