= Communist League (Denmark) =

- Founded: 1973
- Ideology: Communism; Marxism-Leninism
- Political position: Far-left

The Communist League (Danish: Kommunistisk Forbund; KF) was a political party in Denmark. KF was founded on 21 January 1973 in Århus, by the "Leninist Fraction" (a name given to them by their opponents) inside the Left Socialists (VS).

The party maintained between 300 and 350 active members from 1973 until it was dissolved in 1980 when its members rejoined VS.

== History ==
The "Leninist Fraction" had emerged in 1970, following the disillusionment of a faction within VS that wanted a stronger focus on labour struggles. The faction was able to push through a new party programme and win leadership of VS at the fourth VS congress in 1971. VS then plunged into factional infighting. The conflicts reached their peak at the fifth congress in November 1972, after which the faction left VS. In fact, the faction was able to gather a majority of the delegates at the 1972 congress, but in spite of this they opted to leave VS and form a new organization on the grounds that it was not possible to build a militant and revolutionary organization cohabitating with hippies and anti-trade union tendencies. Around 300 VS members followed the faction to found KF, leaving VS with just around 300 members.

The Kommunistisk Forbund was established 21 January 1973 in Aarhus. KF was mainly centered on Aarhus and Aalborg, which had been the main bases of the group that had left VS. In Aarhus it had a base among student activists in the 'Students Front'. The Copenhagen branch of KF was quite weak, however. KF established new branches in Odense and Helsingør, and became the leading force in the revolutionary left in Aarhus, Aalborg, and Odense. KF started publishing Vejen til Socialismen in 1976 and Arbejderpolitik in 1977.

In 1975, factional conflicts surged within KF. One section, centered in the university environment in Aarhus, emerged as a group called the "Coffee Club" (Kaffeklubben). It proposed certain renewals of the strategy of KF. Ahead of the 1977 congress, a document, based upon the inputs from the Coffee Club, was approved as a strategic document of KF.

In 1977, about 6% of delegates, based in Copenhagen, formed the splinter group Kommunistisk Forbund - politik (KF-p). Members of KF-p were more closely aligned with Leninism than KF, and differed from the party in their position that the 1917 October Revolution was the basis of communist revolution in Denmark. After departing from KF, KF-p attempted to join VS, but were denied entry on grounds of political disagreements.

In 1980 the party was dissolved and its members rejoined VS. During its existence, KF held seven congresses and various annual summer camps.
