= Communist Party of Togo =

Political party in Togo

Communist Party of Togo Parti communiste du Togo
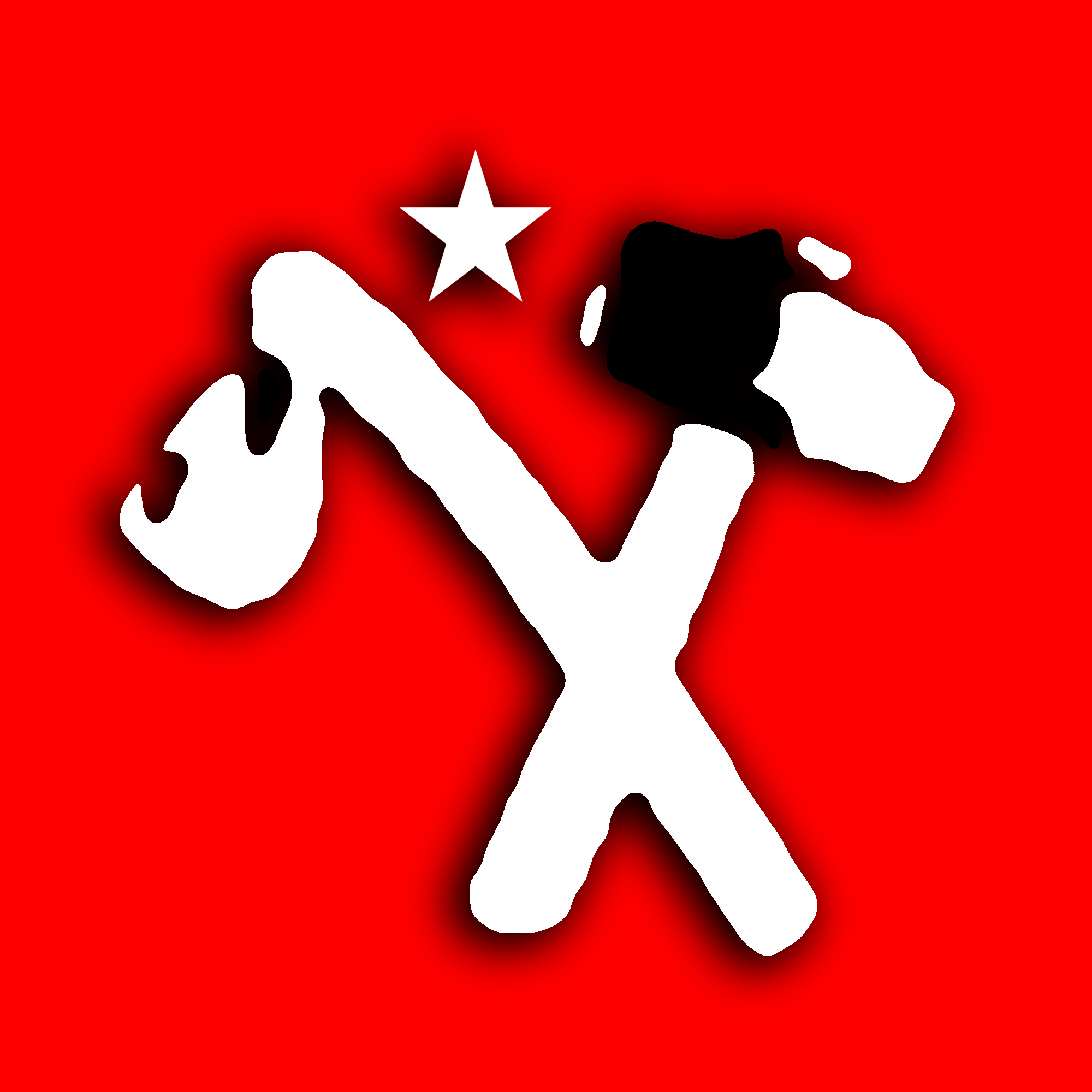
- Founded: 4 May 1980
- Preceded by: Communist Group of Togo
- Newspaper: Révolution
- Youth wing: Communist Youth Organisation of Togo
- Ideology: Communism; Marxism–Leninism; Hoxhaism; Anti-revisionism
- Political position: Far-left
- International affiliation: ICOR
- Colors: Red

Website
- www.pctogo.org

The Communist Party of Togo (French: Parti communiste du Togo, abbreviated PCT) is a communist party in Togo. It publishes the newspaper Révolution and has a youth wing, the Communist Youth Organisation of Togo (OJCT). It is a member of the International Coordination of Revolutionary Parties & Organizations (ICOR).

== History ==
The party was established on 4 May 1980 and originally followed the political line of the Party of Labour of Albania. The PCT evolved out of the Communist Group of Togo (GCT), which was later known as Communist Organisation of Togo (OCT).

== See also ==
- List of anti-revisionist groups
