= Eskor Toyo =

Nigerian Academician

- Born: 1929
- Died: 7 December 2015 (aged 85–86)
- Education: University of London
- Occupation: Lecturer

Eskor Toyo (born Asuquo Ita; 1929 – 7 December 2015) was a Nigerian Marxist scholar, writer and academic. Until his death, he was a professor of economics at the University of Calabar.

== Biography ==
Born in 1929 in Oron, Akwa Ibom State, Eskor completed his education in Calabar and Lagos. While in Grade One in 1945, he obtained the Cambridge School Certificate and the Cambridge Higher School Certificate which he passed. After obtaining a Diploma in Public Administration, he proceeded to the University of London where he obtained a BSc in economics. Eskor furthered his education by obtaining a postgraduate diploma in National Economic Planning, an MSc and a PhD in economics.

As an academic, Eskor taught economics in some universities in Europe and Nigeria before he became head of Department of Economics in the Universities of Maiduguri and Calabar.

Eskor was one of the pioneering founders of defunct Nigerian Marxist–Leninist party Socialist Workers and Farmers Party of Nigeria. After suffering from series of strokes, he died on 7 December 2015 at the University of Calabar Teaching Hospital in Calabar.

== Bibliography ==
- Eskor Toyo (1976). The Petroleum and Angolan Crises and the Nature of Imperialism. Department of Economics, University of Maiduguri.
- Eskor Toyo (1993). The International Politics of Capital Drain: Being the 1993 NSIA Lecture, Delivered on 27 September 1993, at the Nigerian Institute of International Affair[s], Lagos. Nigerian Institute of International Affairs (NIIA) Press.
- Eskor Toyo (2001). Delusions of a popular paradigm: essays on alternative path to economic development. Nigerian Economic Society. ISBN 978-978-2984-01-2.
- Eskor Toyo (1976). The Petroleum and Angolan Crises and the Nature of Imperialism. Department of Economics, University of Maiduguri.
