= Polish Communist Party =

Polish Communist Party may refer to:

- Communist Party of Poland (1918–1938)
- Polish Workers' Party (1942–1948)
- Polish United Workers' Party (1948–1990)
- Communist Party of Poland (Mijal) (1965–1978)
- Union of Polish Communists "Proletariat" (1990–2002)
- Polish Communist Party (2002–present)
