= Communist Party of Canada (disambiguation) =

The Communist Party of Canada is a federal political party in Canada. It may also refer to the:

- Provincial wings of the Communist Party of Canada:
  - Communist Party of Canada (Alberta)
  - Communist Party of Canada (British Columbia)
  - Communist Party of Canada (Manitoba)
  - Communist Party of Canada (Ontario)
  - Communist Party of Canada (Saskatchewan)
- Communist Party of Canada (Marxist–Leninist), a federal political party unrelated to the Communist Party of Canada
- Workers' Communist Party, a federal and provincial political party active from 1975 to 1983
