= Kunle Oyero =

Nigerian politician

Senator
- Constituency: Ogun Central Senatorial District

Personal details
- Died: June 26, 2024
- Occupation: Politician

Kunle Oyero was Nigerian politician. He served as a senator representing Ogun Central Senatorial District at the Senate in the Second Republic. He died on June 26, 2024, at the age of 100.
