= Revolutionary Communist Youth =

Revolutionary Communist Youth may refer to:

- Revolutionary Communist Youth (Argentina)
- Revolutionary Communist Youth (Norway)
- Revolutionary Communist Youth (Sweden)
- Jeunesse communiste révolutionnaire, a French Trotskyist organisation founded after the dissolution of the Union of Communist Students
