= Communist Party of Bangladesh (Marxist) =

Political party of Bangladesh

Communist Party of Bangladesh (Marxist) বাংলাদেশের কমিউনিস্ট পার্টি (মার্কসবাদী)
- Abbreviation: CPBM; CPB (Marxist)
- General Secretary: M.A. Samad
- Founded: 2007
- Headquarters: Topkhana Road, Dhaka, Bangladesh
- Ideology: Communism; Marxism–Leninism; Mao Zedong Thought
- Political position: Far-left
- Colours: Red

The Communist Party of Bangladesh (Marxist) is a Communist political party in Bangladesh. The Communist Party of Bangladesh (Marxist) Party have major presence in Barisal and Dhaka.

Doctor M.A. Samad is the general secretary of Communist Party of Bangladesh (Marxist).
