= Revolutionary Communist League =

The Revolutionary Communist League can refer to one of several different parties:

- Japan Revolutionary Communist League
- Revolutionary Communist League of Bangladesh
- Revolutionary Communist League (France)
- Revolutionary Communist League (Belgium)
- Revolutionary Communist League (Austria) Revolutionäre Kommunistische Liga
- Revolutionary Communist League (Iceland)
- Revolutionary Communist League (India)
- Revolutionary Communist League (Israel) Ha-Liga Ha-Komunistit Ha-Mahapchanit (an offshoot of Matzpen)
- Revolutionary Communist League (Italy) Lega Comunista Rivoluzionaria
- Revolutionary Communist League (Mexico) Liga Communista Revolutionario
- Revolutionary Communist League (Palestine)
- Revolutionary Communist League (Spain) Liga Comunista Revolucionaria
- Socialist Equality Party (Sri Lanka), originally known as the Revolutionary Communist League
- Revolutionary Communist League (UK), a.k.a. The Chartists
- Revolutionary Communist League of Britain
- Revolutionary Communist League (Internationalist) (United States)
- Revolutionary Communist League (Marxist-Leninist-Mao Tse-tung Thought) (United States)

== See also ==
- Revolutionary Communist Group (disambiguation)
- Revolutionary Communist Party (disambiguation)
- Communist League (disambiguation)
- Communist Revolutionary League of India
