= Communist Workers Party (Japan) =

Communist Workers Party 共産主義労働者党
- Founders: Tomochika Naito; Masumi Shirakawa; Momo Ida
- Founded: November 1966
- Dissolved: December 1971
- Headquarters: Tokyo, Japan
- Newspaper: Toitsu
- Student wing: Proletarian Student Alliance
- Youth wing: Proletarian Youth Alliance
- Ideology: Communism; Marxism–Leninism
- Political position: Far-left

The Communist Workers Party (Japanese: 共産主義労働者党) was a pro-Soviet communist party in Japan. It was founded in November 1966 and split into three factions in December 1971. The party published the newspaper Toitsu between February 1967 and December 1971.

The youth wing of the party was the Proletarian Youth League and its student branch was the Proletarian Student League.

== History ==
In November 1966 the Koukaiha party (a branch of the Leftist movement) and the Soviet party (the leftist "Japan's Voice" branch) combined to create a new party. At the start of the party there was a strong connection between them and the Peace for Vietnam Committee (Beheiren). While registration for the Communist Workers Party occurred, members including Iida Momo, Yoshikawa Yuuichi, Kurihara Yukio, Muto Ichiyo, and Hanazaki Kouhei participated in the Peace for Vietnam Committee. It was in regards to the previous point that Okatome Yasunori, who was involved in the Communist Labor Party's Proletarian Student League thought it was a maneuvering tactic by the Japanese Communist Workers Party. Other Proletarian Student League members included Kasai Kiyoshi and Kamewada Takeshi who tried to base their operations at Hosei University.

Eventually the party would go on to expand their operations into Kyushu, the cities of Okayama, Kyoto, Osaka, and Aichi prefecture, however in 1970 the Anpo treaty caused an internal rift within the party. This led to the Japanese Communist Workers Party splitting off into three branches and dissolving.

- Worker Revolution Party: They were centered around Higuchi Tokuzo and considered to be right wing. Later they would change their name to become the National Workers Party Council. Their newspaper was Revolution of Flames. At the end of the 1980s the organization appeared to naturally died down.
- Proletarian Revolutionaries (Prokakuha): They were centered around Shirakawa Masumi and considered to be centrists. After its split, they became the Japanese Communist Workers Party's main faction. The Japanese Communist Workers Party's National Council was their official name. Their newspaper was Unity.
- Red War Front Faction: This party was centered around Iida Momo and considered left wing. Shitara Kiyoutsugu and Kasai Kiyoshi belonged to this group. Their newspaper was Red War Front. While they were created by the Proletarian Student League, they didn't have many members, and the activities of the faction stagnated. Hating the situation, Iida Momo left his leadership position then broke away from the organization. The surviving members focused their attention on the Sanrizuka Struggle and in the end of the 1980s the organization naturally died out.

The Proletarian Youth League, which became the Proletarian Revolutionaries' youth organization, joined forces with the Senki communist faction (also known as the Ara faction), crossing paths with the Red Helmet Three and occupying the control tower which caused the opening of Narita Airport's ports to be postponed. They were thought to be involved in parliament groups such as "People Against Nuclear Power Plants" and "Peace citizens". In 1996 the Proletarian Revolutionaries' name changed to "Sosei: a parliamentary group aiming for autonomy, solidarity, and environmentalism" (Party paper: Glocal), members like Shirakawa and Miyabe Akira coming out as directors of the Rainbow and Greens Party, Green party (Currently the Green Table), Green Future, and Green Party Greens Japan.

Helmet

At the start, the Japanese Communist Workers Party's Proletarian Student League was made up of members of the leftist Democratic Student League, a league that was a part of the pro-Soviet "Japan's Voice", a group that was run by Japanese Communist Party defectors like Shiga Yoshio. In March 1968, students that had been affiliated with the Japanese Communist Workers Party's Proletarian Student League used the white colored helmets of the Democratic Student League. However, afterwards they changed to using the green color of Koukaiha for their helmets. In March 1969, the Proletarian Student League refreshed the design by using green helmets that they had drawn "Pro-Gakudou" on in white.

On January 19, 1970, the Japanese Communist Workers Party published an article titled "The Shared Red Helmet of the Revolutionary Soldier." This article was based on a summary of the previous campaign and declares their intent to continue a radical campaign. "This is the age of rebellion which is symbolized with red – the shared color of people who wage war," The color of the Proletarian Student League's helmets were then changed to red.

According to one theory, during the November Battle, which took place from November 16 to 17, 1969, in the struggle to prevent Prime Minister Sato from visiting the United States that took place, front line protestors who had left Proletarian Student League's rally at Ogimachi station in Osaka clashed with the riot police. After Kasuya Takayuki, a student of Okayama University, died, it's possible that the Proletarian Student League changed their helmets to the color red in mourning for his death.
