= Swaziland Communist Party =

Political party in Eswatini

- Abbreviation: SWACOPA
- Leaders: Mphandlana Shongwe; Zakhe Genindza
- Founded: 1994
- Ideology: Communism; Marxism–Leninism
- Political position: Far-left

The Swaziland Communist Party (SWACOPA) was a Marxist-Leninist party in Eswatini. SWACOPA was founded around 1994. It was led by Mphandlana Shongwe and Zakhe Genindza.

SWACOPA's activities were suppressed by the regime, and several cadres were detained. Following the removal of the 1973 decree to make way for the new constitution, the party was one of the first to register as an official political party.
