= Revolutionary Communist Party =

Revolutionary Communist Party may refer to:

== Active ==
- Revolutionary Communist Party (Argentina)
- Revolutionary Communist Party (Brazil)
- Voltaic Revolutionary Communist Party
- Revolutionary Communist Party of China
- Revolutionary Communist Party of India
- Revolutionary Communist Party of Ivory Coast
- Revolutionary Communist Party (Spain)
- Revolutionary Communist Party of Turkey
- Revolutionary Communist Party of Britain (Marxist–Leninist)
- Revolutionary Communist Party, USA

=== National sections of the Revolutionary Communist International ===
- Revolutionary Communists of America
- Revolutionary Communist Party (Canada)
- Revolutionary Communist Party (Denmark)
- Revolutionary Communist Party (Italy)
- Revolutionary Communist Party (Japan)
- Revolutionary Communist Party (Sweden)
- Revolutionary Communist Party (Taiwan)
- Revolutionary Communist Party (UK, 2024)

== Defunct ==
- Revolutionary Communist Party (Belgium)
- Revolutionary Communist Party (Chile)
- Revolutionary Communist Party (India)
- Revolutionary Communist Party of India (Das)
- Revolutionary Communist Party of India (Tagore)
- Revolutionary Communist Party – Red Trench
- Revolutionary Communist Party (Working Class)
- Revolutionary Communist Party (UK, 1944), active from 1944 to 1950
- Revolutionary Communist Party (UK, 1977), active from 1977 to 1996

== See also ==
- Revolutionary Communist International
- Revolutionary Communist League (disambiguation)
- Revolutionary Communist League (disambiguation)
- Communist Vanguard of the Revolutionary Workers' Party
- Communist Revolutionary Party (France)
- Communist Revolutionary Party of France
- Communist Party of Revolutionary Marxists
- Revolutionary Palestinian Communist Party
- Party of Revolutionary Communism
- Sudanese Communist Party – Revolutionary Leadership
- Communist Party of Turkey – Revolutionary Wing
