= Communist Party of Germany (disambiguation) =

Communist Party of Germany (in German: Kommunistische Partei Deutschlands, KPD) is a name that has been and is being used by several Communist organizations in Germany.

- The original Communist Party of Germany, founded in 1919. It was banned in West Germany in 1956, and became part of the Socialist Unity Party in East Germany
- Communist Party of Germany/Marxists–Leninists (KPD/ML), a West German Maoist and later Hoxhaist group existing from 1968 to 1986
- Communist Party of Germany (Roter Morgen) ("Communist Party of Germany [Red Dawn]"), a communist party named after its party newspaper founded in 1985 as a remnant of the KPD/ML
- Communist Party of Germany (1990), founded in 1990, also known as Communist Party of Germany (Red Flag) after its newspaper
- Communist Party of Germany (Opposition), an opposition organisation from 1928 until 1939 or 1940, illegal from 1933

== See also ==
- The German Communist Party (1968) (DKP), formed in West Germany in 1968
- Communist Workers' Party of Germany, an anti-parliamentarian communist party active in the Weimar Republic
- Socialist Unity Party of Germany, the governing communist political party of East Germany
