= Communist Workers Party (Austria) =

Austrian political party of the 1920s

Communist Workers Party was an Austrian council communist party. It was founded in 1924, and was modelled after the Communist Workers' Party of Germany. Its political influence was however very limited. The party publication was printed in Berlin, and the group had only a handful of members. The party disappeared soon after its formation.
