= Maoist Communist Party =

Maoist Communist Party is the name of a political party that may refer to:

- Maoist Communist Party (Turkey)
- Maoist Communist Party of China
- Maoist Communist Party of Manipur (India)
- Communist Party of India (Maoist)

== See also ==
- List of communist parties, which include many ideologically Maoist parties
- Communist Party of India (Maoist), political party and militant group leading the Naxalite–Maoist insurgency in India
  - Maoist Communist Centre of India, now merged into the above
- Communist Party of Nepal (Maoist) (disambiguation)
