= Communist Party of Guatemala =

Communist Party of Guatemala may refer to:

- Communist Party of Guatemala (1922–1932), formed by leftist elements of Socialist Workers Unification
- Guatemalan Party of Labour (1949–1998), known earlier as the Communist Party of Guatemala
