= Bulgarian United Communist Party =

Bulgarian United Communist Party Българска единна комунистическа партия
- Leader: Atanas Vasilev; Mihail Mihaylov
- Founded: 11 December 1993
- Dissolved: 2000
- Headquarters: Sofia
- Ideology: Communism; Marxism
- Colours: Red, White
- National Assembly: 0 / 240
- European Parliament: 0 / 18

Bulgarian United Communist Party (Bulgarian: Българска единна комунистическа партия, romanized: Bulgarska edinna komunisticheska partia) was a political party in Bulgaria. The party was founded on 11 December 1993. It was led by Atanas Vasilev and Mihail Mihaylov. Its formation was published in the State Gazette in 1994.

In 2000 the party merged into the Communist Party of Bulgaria.
