= Nigerian Communist Party =

Political party in Nigeria

The Nigerian Communist Party (NCP) was a communist party in Nigeria. The NCP was banned by Decree 34 of the regime of General Johnson Aguiyi-Ironsi in 1966.
