= Communist Party of the Menadores =

Communist Party of the Menadores Partido Comunista de los Menadores
- Founded: 2001
- Headquarters: C/ San Marcos 21, bajo B; Callosa de Segura, (Province of Alicante)
- Ideology: Communism

Communist Party of the Menadores (in Spanish: Partido Comunista de los Menadores, 'menadores' is a certain trade of spinners) was a political party in the municipality of Callosa de Segura, province of Alicante, Spain. PCM is listed at the election authorities. The party was registered on June 5, 2001.

PCM contested the 2003 municipal elections in Callosa de Segura. The party got 94 votes (0.94%) and no seat.
