= Communist Party of Mozambique =

Communist Party of Mozambique Partido Comunista de Moçambique
- Founded: 1995
- Ideology: Communism; Marxism-Leninism

The Communist Party of Mozambique (in Portuguese: Partido Comunista de Moçambique or Pacomo) was founded in 1995 and is inactive, possibly dissolved.

The formation of PACOMO was announced on April 12, 1995. The manifesto of the party was published on May 20, 1995. Almeida Tesoura was the general secretary of the party. The party drew inspiration from the 1977 Third Congress of FRELIMO.
