= Bulgarian Communist Party – Marxists =

Bulgarian Communist Party – Marxists Българска комунистическа партия - марксисти
- Leader: Boris Petkov
- Founded: 1990
- Headquarters: Sofia, Bulgaria
- Ideology: Communism; Marxism
- Colours: Red, White
- National Assembly: 0 / 240
- European Parliament: 0 / 17

Logo of the Communist Party of Bulgaria

Bulgarian Communist Party – Marxists (Bulgarian: Българска комунистическа партия – марксисти), abbreviated BCP-Marxists (Bulgarian: БКП-марксисти) is a communist party in Bulgaria, founded in 1990. The chairman of the Executive Committee of the party is Boris Petkov.

BCP-M took part in the 1991 parliamentary elections. It got 7663 votes (0.14%).

The BCP-M has close ties with the Workers' Party of Korea.
