= Paraguayan Communist Party (independent) =

Political party in Paraguay

Paraguayan Communist Party (independent) Partido Comunista Paraguayo (independente)
- Abbreviation: PCP
- Founder: Oscar Creydt
- Founded: 1967
- Legalised: 1989
- Split from: Paraguayan Communist Party
- Newspaper: Unidad Paraguaya
- Ideology: Communism; Marxism–Leninism; Maoism; Anti-revisionism
- Political position: Far-left
- International affiliation: ICOR

Paraguayan Communist Party (independent) (in Spanish: Partido Comunista Paraguayo (independiente) is a Marxist-Leninist political party in Paraguay. PCP(i) was founded in 1967 as a split from the Paraguayan Communist Party (PCP). Since the defeat of the guerrilla groups led by the PCP in 1963, opposition to the party leader Oscar Creydt in the PCP had grown. He was first criticised for his authoritarian behaviour and later for his anti-Cuban and pro-Chinese positions. He was deposed as secretary general in August 1965 and excluded from the party in 1967. His party faction first kept the same name as the pro-soviet faction but since 1973 “independent” was added to the party name. Many of the activities of the PCP(i) were directed against the PCP. The party was subjected to harsh repression by the regime of Alfredo Stroessner. It publishes “Unidad Paraguaya”. When Creydt died in 1987 the party was very weak. When Stroessner fell in 1989 the party stayed in a semi-clandestinity.

== International relations ==
The PCP(i) was a maoist party. Oscar Creydt visited China in 1977 and 1980 and supported the political orientation of the post-Mao regime. The PCP(i) today is a member party of the maoist International Coordination of Revolutionary Parties and Organizations.

The maoist PCP and its successor the PCP(i) are sometimes called Paraguayan Communist Party (Marxist–Leninist) or Communist Party of Paraguay.

== See also ==
- List of anti-revisionist groups
