= Communist Party of Portugal (in Construction) =

PCP (ec) poster, calling for electoral boycott

Communist Party of Portugal (in construction) (in Portuguese: Partido Comunista de Portugal (em construção)) was a communist party in Portugal. PC de P (ec) existed around 1975. It published O Bolchevista.

The party advocated boycott of the elections to the Constituent Assembly.
