= Revolutionary Communists of America =

American political party

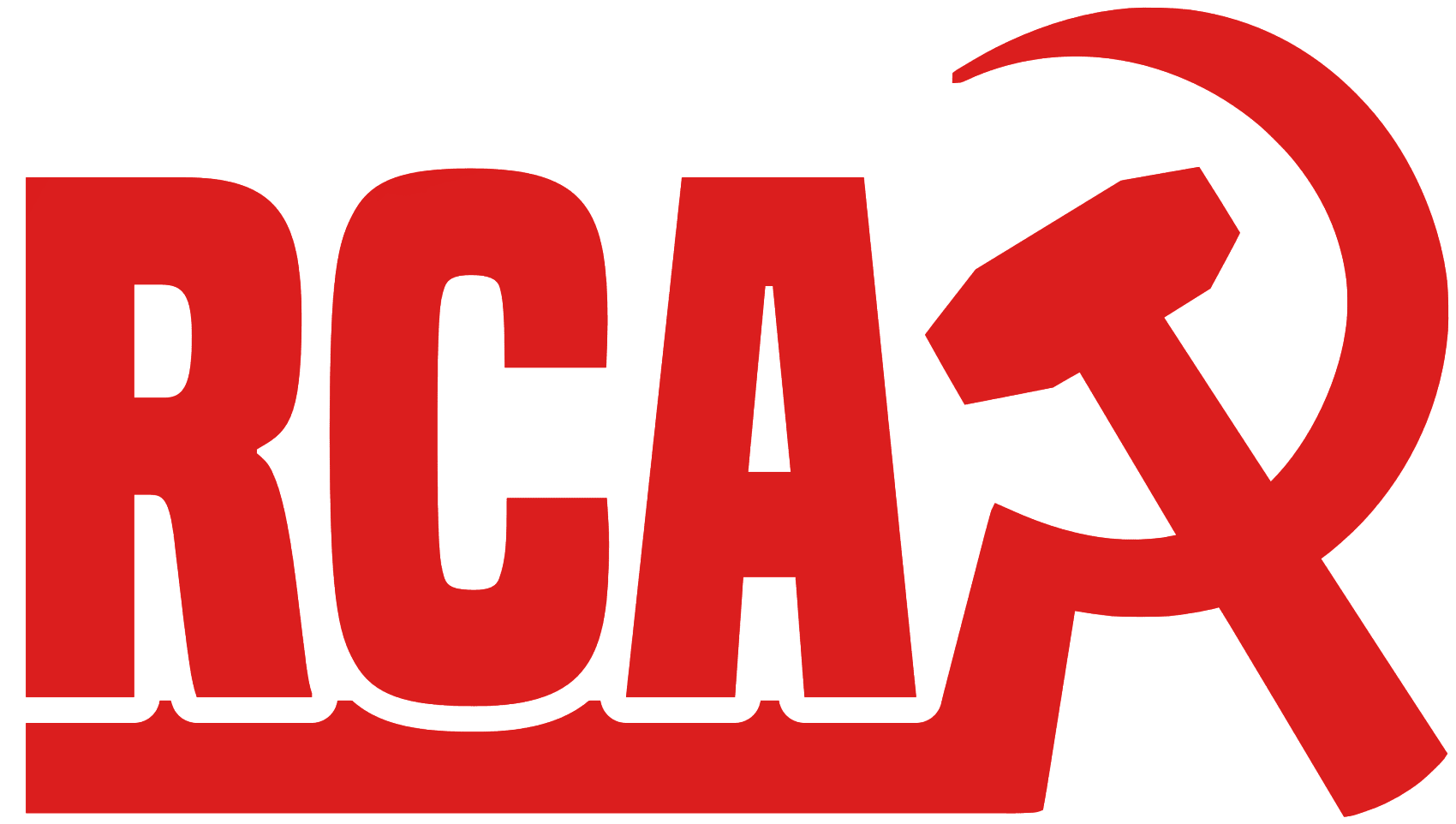
- Abbreviation: RCA
- Governing body: Central Committee
- Founded: 1998
- Newspaper: The Communist
- Membership (May 2026): ~1100
- Ideology: Communism; Trotskyism
- Political position: Far-left
- International affiliation: Revolutionary Communist International
- Members in elected offices: 0

Website
- communistusa.org

The Revolutionary Communists of America (RCA) is a communist political party in the United States. RCA is the US section of the Revolutionary Communist International (RCI), a Trotskyist political international formerly known as the International Marxist Tendency (IMT). RCA first formed in 1998.

RCA describes itself as a revolutionary socialist party fighting for a workers' government and a democratically planned economy, because capitalism cannot be "gradually reformed out of existence".

== Ideology ==
RCA is a Trotskyist party, arguing that communists "must base ourselves" on "the writings of Marx, Engels, Lenin, and Trotsky", which are the "pinnacle of revolutionary theory". Joaquin Montelibano characterizes RCA as a "middle of the road" Trotskyist organization, between "programmatic" orthodox Trotskyists and "progressive" post-Trotskyists who seek collaboration with left and progressive organizations.

RCA's program supports public ownership of "the essential levers of the economy", economic planning, a $30 minimum wage and a 20-hour workweek, "socialized health care", public college for all, and "guaranteed employment". RCA supports anti-racism, anti-sexism, anti-transphobia, anti-xenophobia, and anti-imperialism.

== Membership ==
In August 2023, Socialist Revolution claimed 340 members. In February 2024, RCA claimed 630 members. In June 2024, RCA claimed 800 members. In August 2026, RCA claimed over 1100 members just before the event of the RCA’s party congress that year during May.

== History ==
=== Renamings ===
Logo used when the group was Socialist Revolution (2017–2024).

An April 2024 RCA rally in Minneapolis, MN

In 1998, supporters of the International Marxist Tendency (IMT) in the United States created the group as Youth for International Socialism (YFIS), which published New Youth. In June 2002, YFIS renamed itself to the Workers' International League (WIL) and its newspaper to Socialist Appeal. The group was usually known as Socialist Appeal (SA). In 2017, WIL renamed its newspaper to Socialist Revolution. The group was usually known as Socialist Revolution (SR). In 2024, WIL renamed itself to the Revolutionary Communists of America and its newspaper to The Communist, as part of an IMT-wide rebranding from Trotskyist labels & symbols to more generic communist labels & hammer and sickle symbols. IMT itself renamed to the Revolutionary Communist International (RCI) in 2025.

=== Subsequent history ===
In 2020, after the rapid growth of the Democratic Socialists of America (DSA), many SR members joined DSA chapters. In contrast to the DSA's current strategy, in which virtually all elected DSA endorsees won on the Democratic Party ballot line, SR members demand "an immediate and total break with the Democrats".

In 2022, conservative website Campus Reform negatively covered SR's "Marxist School" events, where a Turning Point USA reporter noted that the Socialist Revolution organizers "allegedly called for a revolution".

In 2023, SR members put up posters near college campuses which read: "Are you a communist? Then get organized." The posters were styled after "I Want YOU for US Army".

In 2024, after its founding convention, RCA held a rally of 300-500 people in Philadelphia, who chanted "fight the rich and feed the poor!" When Elon Musk replied with "!" to a video of this on X, the RCA said "billionaires are parasites".

In 2024, several conservative influencers spread a fake video of Kamala Harris and Tim Walz posing with a Revolutionary Communists of America sign. The image went viral among some American Latino communities. The La Nueva Poderosa podcast cited the video to prove Kamala has "no shame" about supporting communism. When corrected, the hosts said their story was "not true" but that "doesn't take away from the reality that Kamala is a Marxist".

In June 2025, RCA members in Los Angeles joined the protests against mass deportation. In October 2025, RCA members also joined the No Kings protests in New York City, Chicago, and New Orleans.

== See also ==
- American Left
- Democratic Socialists of America
- Socialist Alternative
- Revolutionary Communist International
