= Colombian Communist Party – Maoist =

Communist Party of Colombia - Maoist Partido Comunista de Colombia - Maoista
- Abbreviation: PCC-M
- Founded: August 7, 2001
- Newspaper: Periódico Nuevos Tiempos
- Ideology: Communism; Marxism–Leninism–Maoism
- Political position: Far-left
- International affiliation: ICOR

Website
- https://pcc-m.blogspot.com/

Colombian Communist Party – Maoist (Spanish: Partido Comunista de Colombia - Maoista) is a Colombian Marxist–Leninist–Maoist political party. It was founded by the Communist Organization of Colombia (Marxist–Leninist–Maoist) in July 2001.

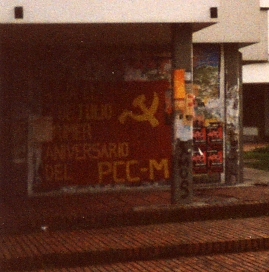
PCC-M mural at university in Bogotá

The party is a member of the International Coordination of Revolutionary Parties and Organizations.
