= Libertarian Communist Party (Spain) =

Libertarian Communist Party (in Spanish: Partido Comunista Libertario) was a political party in Spain. Based in Valencia, PCL was registered in 1991.
