= Bolshevik Communist Party =

Communist group in Mexico

Bolshevik Communist Party (Spanish: Partido Comunista Bolchevique) was a communist group in Mexico during the 1960s. PCB was founded in August 1963 by a group that had been expelled from the Mexican Communist Party (PCM) in April 1962. The group had been in operation as a faction within the Federal District Committee of the PCM, which had opposed the new leadership of the party installed at the 1960 congress. Leading members of PCB were Guillermo Rousset Banda and Santiago González.

Soon after its formation, the PCB was torn by conflict between the 'Provisional National Leadership of PCB' (led by the 'Román Guerra Montemayor' cell of the party) and the 'Antonio Gramsci' cell. The latter faction was led by Rousset.

In the end the followers of Rousset were expelled from the party, and formed the Revolutionary Party of the Proletariat in March 1964. The group around the 'Román Guerra Montemayor' cell continued to operate under the name PCB.
