= Revolutionary Communist Party (Working Class) =

Peruvian political party

The Revolutionary Communist Party (Working Class) (Spanish: Partido Comunista Revolucionario-Clase Obrera) was a Maoist communist political party in Peru in the 1970s. Founded as a split faction from Vanguardia Revolucionaria-Político Militar, it was led by Manuel Dammert Ego-Aguirre and Ernie de la Jara y Basombrío.
