= Communist Party of Labour =

Communist Party of Labour Partido Comunista del Trabajo
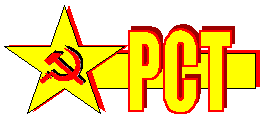
- General Secretary: Manuel Salazar
- Founded: 20 June 1980
- Split from: Dominican Popular Movement
- Headquarters: Santo Domingo
- Ideology: Communism; Marxism–Leninism; Hoxhaism; Anti-revisionism
- Political position: Far-left
- National affiliation: Broad Front
- Regional affiliation: São Paulo Forum
- International affiliation: ICMLPO

Website
- www.pct.gq.nu

The Communist Party of Labour (Spanish: Partido Comunista del Trabajo) is a Marxist-Leninist and Hoxhaist party in the Dominican Republic. The party was founded on 20 June 1980, after the split from the Maoist Dominican Popular Movement. PCT upheld the political line of the Party of Labour of Albania. The party is an active member of the International Conference of Marxist-Leninist Parties and Organizations.

The general secretary of the party is Manuel Salazar. The party publishes Lucha.

PCT takes part in elections through the Broad Front. In the last election MIUCA got 0.32% of the votes.

== See also ==
- List of anti-revisionist groups
