= Revolutionary Communist Party (Spain) =

Revolutionary Communist Party Partido Comunista Revolucionario
- Founded: 1994
- Split from: PCPE
- Newspaper: La Forja
- Youth wing: Marxist-Leninist Youth
- Ideology: Communism; Maoism; Anti-revisionism; Marxism–Leninism–Maoism
- Political position: Far-left
- Colors: Red

Website
- pcree.net

Revolutionary Communist Party (Spanish: Partido Comunista Revolucionario) is a Marxist-Leninist and Maoist party in Spain. PCR was formed through a split in PCPE. PCR published La Forja until 2006. Since then the party has largely ceased its public activities. The PCR is an orthodox Maoist organization, being highly critical of the other communist parties of Spain, especially of the importance those parties give to Republicanist positions. The PCR has been linked with the Anti-imperialist Movement and the Committee for Reconstitution.

== See also ==
- List of anti-revisionist groups
