= Communist Party of Castilla–La Mancha =

Communist Party of Spain–Communist Party of Castilla–La Mancha Partido Comunista de España–Partido Comunista de Castilla–La Mancha
- Secretary-General: Jorge Vega Martín
- Founded: November 14, 1921
- Merger of: Spanish Communist Party; Spanish Communist Workers' Party
- Headquarters: C/ Cuesta de los Pascuales, 5; 45001 Toledo
- Newspaper: Mundo Obrero
- Youth wing: Communist Youth Union of Spain
- Ideology: Communism; Eurocommunism
- National affiliation: United Left
- European affiliation: Party of the European Left
- European Parliament group: European United Left-Nordic Green Left
- Trade union affiliation: Workers' Commissions

Website
- www.pcecastillalamancha.com

PCCM logo

The Communist Party of Castilla–La Mancha (in Spanish: Partido Comunista de Castilla–La Mancha) is the federation of the Communist Party of Spain (PCE) in Castilla–La Mancha.
