= List of anti-revisionist groups =

The following are Marxist–Leninist groups that are or historically were considered to be anti-revisionist, i.e. groups that uphold the opinion that the Soviet Union diverged from socialist practice in 1956 under the leadership of Nikita Khrushchev.

== Africa ==
=== Algeria ===
- Algerian Party for Democracy and Socialism

=== Angola ===
- Communist Organization of Angola

=== Benin ===
- Communist Party of Benin
- Marxist–Leninist Communist Party of Benin
- Union of Communists of Dahomey

=== Botswana ===
- MELS Movement of Botswana

=== Burkina Faso ===
- Voltaic Revolutionary Communist Party

=== Ethiopia ===
- Marxist–Leninist League of Tigray

=== Ivory Coast ===
- Revolutionary Communist Party of Ivory Coast

=== Mali ===
- Malian Party of Labour

=== Morocco ===
- Democratic Way

=== Senegal ===
- Senegalese Communist Party

=== Sudan ===
- Sudanese Communist Party – Revolutionary Leadership

=== Tunisia ===
- Workers' Party

== Americas ==
=== Argentina ===
- Communist Party of Argentina
- Communist Party of Argentina (Extraordinary Congress)
- Revolutionary Communist Party (Argentina)

=== Colombia ===
- E.P.L. Ejercito Popular de Liberación
- E.P.L. Partido Comunista Marxista-Leninista Pensamiento Mao Tse-Tung

=== Bolivia ===
- Communist Party of Bolivia
- Communist Party of Bolivia (Marxist–Leninist)

=== Brazil ===
- Brazilian Communist Party
- Communist Party of Brazil
- Revolutionary Communist Party (Brazil)

=== Canada ===
- Communist Party of Canada
- Communist Party of Canada (Marxist–Leninist)

=== Chile ===
- Chilean Communist Party (Proletarian Action)
- Patriotic Union (Chile)
- Revolutionary Communist Party (Chile)

=== Colombia ===
- Colombian Communist Party
- Colombian Communist Party – Maoist
- Communist Party of Colombia (Marxist–Leninist)
- Popular Liberation Army

=== Costa Rica ===
- People's Vanguard Party (Costa Rica)
- Worker-Peasant Party

=== Dominican Republic ===
- Communist Party of Labour
- Dominican Workers Party

=== Ecuador ===
- Communist Party of Ecuador
- Communist Party of Ecuador – Red Sun
- Marxist–Leninist Communist Party of Ecuador
- Democratic People's Movement
- Popular Unity (Ecuador)
- Workers' Party of Ecuador

=== Guyana ===
- Working People's Vanguard Party

=== Haiti ===
- New Haitian Communist Party (Marxist–Leninist)

=== Mexico ===
- Communist Party of Mexico (1994)
- Communist Party of Mexico (Marxist–Leninist)
- Popular Socialist Party of Mexico

=== Nicaragua ===
- Marxist–Leninist Popular Action Movement

=== Panama ===
- People's Party of Panama

=== Paraguay ===
- Paraguayan Communist Party
- Paraguayan Communist Party (independent)

=== Peru ===
- Communist Party of Peru – Red Fatherland
- Communist Party of Peru (Shining Path)
- Militarized Communist Party of Peru
- Peruvian Communist Party
- Peruvian Communist Party (Marxist–Leninist)
- Proletarian Party of Peru
- Worker Peasant Student and Popular Front

=== Trinidad and Tobago ===
- Communist Party of Trinidad and Tobago

=== United States ===
==== Active ====
- American Party of Labor
- Freedom Road Socialist Organization
- Progressive Labor Party
- Revolutionary Communist Party, USA

==== Defunct ====
- Communist Labor Party of North America
- Communist Party (Marxist–Leninist)
- Communist Party USA (Marxist–Leninist)
- Communist Workers' Party
- Maoist Internationalist Movement
- Marxist–Leninist Party, USA
- Puerto Rican Revolutionary Workers Organization

=== Uruguay ===
- Revolutionary Communist Party of Uruguay

=== Venezuela ===
- Red Flag Party

== Asia ==
=== Afghanistan ===
- Communist (Maoist) Party of Afghanistan
- Marxist–Leninist Organization of Afghanistan
- Shola-e Javid

=== Azerbaijan ===
- Azerbaijan Communist Party (1993)
- Communist Party of Azerbaijan

=== Bangladesh ===
- Communist Party of Bangladesh (Marxist-Leninist)
- Communist Party of Bangladesh (Marxist–Leninist) (Dutta)
- Maoist Bolshevik Reorganisation Movement of the Purba Banglar Sarbahara Party
- Purba Banglar Sarbahara Party
- Socialist Party of Bangladesh
- Socialist Party of Bangladesh (Marxist)

=== Bhutan ===
- Communist Party of Bhutan (Marxist–Leninist–Maoist)

=== China ===
- Maoist Communist Party of China

=== India ===
- Bolshevik Party of India
- Communist Ghadar Party of India
- Communist League of India (Marxist–Leninist)
- Communist Party of Bharat
- Communist Party of India
- Communist Party of India (Marxist)
- Communist Party of India (Marxist–Leninist)
- Communist Party of India (Marxist–Leninist) Central Team
- Communist Party of India (Marxist–Leninist) Class Struggle
- Communist Party of India (Marxist–Leninist) Liberation
- Communist Party of India (Marxist–Leninist) (Mahadev Mukherjee)
- Communist Party of India (Marxist-Leninist) Mass Line
- Communist Party of India (Marxist–Leninist) New Democracy
- Communist Party of India (Marxist–Leninist) Red Star
- Communist Party of India (Marxist–Leninist) Second Central Committee
- Central Reorganisation Committee, Communist Party of India (Marxist–Leninist)
- Communist Party of India (Maoist)
- Communist Party of United States of India
- Marxist Communist Party of India (United)
- Marxist Co-ordination Committee
- Marxist-Leninist Party of India (Red Flag)
- Peasants and Workers Party of India
- Revolutionary Communist Centre of India (Marxist–Leninist–Maoist)
- Revolutionary Communist Party of India
- Revolutionary Socialist Party (India)
- Revolutionary Socialist Party (Leninist)
- Revolutionary Marxist Party of India
- Socialist Unity Centre of India (Communist)
- Unity Centre of Communist Revolutionaries of India (Marxist–Leninist) (D.V. Rao)
- Unity Centre of Communist Revolutionaries of India (Marxist–Leninist) (Harbhajan Sohi)
- United Communist Party of India
- Workers Party of India

=== Iran ===
- Communist Party of Iran (Marxist–Leninist–Maoist)
- Laborers' Party of Iran
- Labour Party of Iran (Toufan)

=== Japan ===
- Japanese Communist Party (Action Faction)
- Japanese Communist Party (Left Faction)
- Japan Communist Party (Marxist–Leninist)

=== Jordan ===
- Jordanian Communist Party

=== Kazakhstan ===
- Communist Party of Kazakhstan
- Socialist Movement of Kazakhstan

=== Kyrgyzstan ===
- Communist Party of Kyrgyzstan
- Party of Communists of Kyrgyzstan

=== Nepal ===
- Communist Party of Nepal (Maoist Centre)
- Communist Party of Nepal (Unified Marxist–Leninist)
- Communist Party of Nepal (Marxist–Leninist) (2002)
- Communist Party of Nepal (Marxist) (2006)
- Communist Party of Nepal (Masal) (2006)
- Communist Party of Nepal (2013)
- Communist Party of Nepal (2014)
- Communist Party of Nepal (Revolutionary Maoist)
- Communist Party of Nepal (Unified Socialist)
- Rastriya Janamorcha
- Nepal Workers Peasants Party

=== Pakistan ===
- Communist Mazdoor Kissan Party
- Mazdoor Kisan Party

=== Philippines ===
- Communist Party of the Philippines

=== Sri Lanka ===
- Ceylon Communist Party (Maoist)
- New Democratic Marxist–Leninist Party

=== Syria ===
- Arab Communist Party
- Syrian Communist Party (Bakdash)

=== Thailand ===
- Communist Party of Thailand

=== Tajikistan ===
- Communist Party of Tajikistan

=== Turkey ===
- Bolshevik Party (North Kurdistan – Turkey)
- Communist Party of Turkey/Marxist–Leninist
- Communist Party of Turkey/Marxist–Leninist – Hareketi
- Communist Party of Turkey/Marxist–Leninist (New Build-Up Organization)
- Marxist–Leninist Communist Party (Turkey)
- Maoist Communist Party (Turkey)
- Revolutionary Communist Party of Turkey
- Revolutionary Workers' and Peasants' Party of Turkey
- Socialist Party of the Oppressed
- Socialist Workers' Party of Turkey
- Union of Revolutionary Communists of Turkey

=== Turkmenistan ===
- Communist Party of Turkmenistan (1998)

=== Uzbekistan ===
- Communist Party of Uzbekistan (1994)

== Europe ==
=== Albania ===
- Communist Party of Albania (1991)
- Party of Labour of Albania

=== Armenia ===
- Armenian Communist Party
- United Communist Party of Armenia

=== Austria ===
- Communist League of Austria
- Marxist–Leninist Party of Austria
- Party of Labour of Austria

=== Belarus ===
- Communist Party of Belarus

=== Belgium ===
- Communist Party of Belgium (1989)

=== Bulgaria ===
- Bulgarian Communist Party (modern)
- Bulgarian Workers' Party (Communist)
- Communist Party of Bulgaria
- Party of the Bulgarian Communists
- Union of Communists in Bulgaria

=== Croatia ===
- Red Action (Croatia)
- Socialist Workers Party of Croatia

=== Cyprus ===
- Progressive Party of Working People

=== Czech Republic ===
- Communist Party of Bohemia and Moravia

=== Denmark ===
- Communist Party (Denmark)
- Communist Party of Denmark
- Communist Party in Denmark
- Workers' Communist Party (Denmark)

=== Estonia ===
- Communist Party of Estonia (1990)

=== Finland ===
- Communist Workers' Party – For Peace and Socialism
- League of Communists (Finland)
- Marxist–Leninist Groups

=== France ===
- Communist Revolutionary Party of France
- Communist Revolutionary Party (France)
- Pole of Communist Revival in France
- Workers' Communist Party of France

=== Germany ===
- Communist League of West Germany
- Communist Party of Germany/Marxists–Leninists
- Communist Party of Germany (1990)
- Communist Party of Germany (Roter Morgen)
- Marxist–Leninist Party of Germany
- Workers' League for the Reconstruction of KPD

=== Georgia ===
- Communist Party of Georgia
- New Communist Party of Georgia
- Unified Communist Party of Georgia

=== Greece ===
- Communist Organization of Greece
- Communist Party of Greece
- Communist Party of Greece (Marxist–Leninist)
- Marxist–Leninist Communist Party of Greece
- Movement for the Reorganization of the Communist Party of Greece 1918–1955
- Revolutionary Communist Movement of Greece
- People's Resistance

=== Hungary ===
- Hungarian Socialist Workers' Party (1993)
- Hungarian Workers' Party

=== Iceland ===
- Communist Party of Iceland (Marxist-Leninist)

=== Ireland ===
- Communist Party of Ireland
- Communist Party of Ireland (Marxist–Leninist)
- Irish Republican Socialist Party
- Workers' Party

=== Italy ===
- CARC Party
- Communist Party (Italy)
- Italian Communist Party (2016)
- Italian Marxist–Leninist Party
- Marxist–Leninist Italian Communist Party
- Unified Communist Party of Italy

=== Latvia ===
- Socialist Party of Latvia

=== Lithuania ===
- Socialist People's Front

=== Luxembourg ===
- Communist League of Luxembourg
- Communist Party of Luxembourg

=== Macedonia ===
- Communist Party of Macedonia (1992)

=== Netherlands ===
- Communist Party of the Netherlands
- Group of Marxist–Leninists/Red Dawn
- United Communist Party

=== Norway ===
- Workers' Communist Party
- Serve the People (Norway)

=== Malta ===
- Communist Party of Malta

=== Moldova ===
- Party of Communists of the Republic of Moldova

=== Poland ===
- Communist Party of Poland (1965–1996)
- Polish Communist Party (2002)

=== Portugal ===
- Communist Party (Reconstructed)
- Communist Party of Portugal (Marxist–Leninist)
- Portuguese Marxist–Leninist Committee
- Portuguese Marxist–Leninist Communist Organization
- Portuguese Workers' Communist Party

=== Russia ===
- All-Union Communist Party of Bolsheviks (1991)
- Communists of Russia
- Russian Communist Workers Party
- Russian Communist Workers' Party of the Communist Party of the Soviet Union
- Russian Maoist Party
- Stalin Bloc – For the USSR
- Union of Communists
- Vanguard of Red Youth

=== San Marino ===
- Communist Party (Marxist–Leninist) of San Marino

=== Serbia ===
- New Communist Party of Yugoslavia
- Party of Labour (Serbia)

=== Spain ===
- Communist Party of Spain (Marxist–Leninist)
- Communist Party of Spain (Marxist–Leninist) (historical)
- Communist Party of Spain (Reconstituted)
- Communist Party of the Peoples of Spain
- Communist Party of the Workers of Spain
- Communist Unification of Spain
- Marxist–Leninist Front of the Peoples of Spain
- Marxist–Leninist Party (Communist Reconstruction)
- Spanish Communist Workers' Party (1973)
- Revolutionary Communist Party (Spain)
- Workers' Party (Spain)

=== Slovakia ===
- Communist Party of Slovakia
- VZDOR

=== Sweden ===
- Communist Party (Sweden)
- Communist Party in Sweden
- Communist Party of Sweden (1967)
- Communist Party of Sweden (1995)
- Communist Workers' Party of Sweden

=== Switzerland ===
- Communist Party of Switzerland/Marxist–Leninists

=== Ukraine ===
- Communist Party of Ukraine
- Union of Communists of Ukraine

=== United Kingdom ===
- Association of Communist Workers
- Committee to Defeat Revisionism, for Communist Unity
- Communist Party Alliance
- Communist Party of Britain (Marxist–Leninist)
- Communist Party of Great Britain (Marxist–Leninist)
- International Leninist Workers Party
- New Communist Party of Britain
- Revolutionary Communist Party of Britain (Marxist–Leninist)
- Plaid Gomiwnyddol Cymru
- Stalin Society

== Oceania ==
=== Australia ===
- Communist Party of Australia (1971)
- Communist Party of Australia (Marxist–Leninist)
- Red Eureka Movement

== See also ==
- Sino-Soviet split
- Sino-Albanian split

== Sources ==
- Saba, Paul, ed. (1974). "History of the Development of the Puerto Rican Revolutionary Workers Organization". In the U.S. Pregnant with Revisionism: The Struggle for Proletarian Revolution Moves Ahead. New York: PRRWO. OCLC 58400325.
