= Organisation of Marxist–Leninist Communists of Greece =

Organisation of Marxist-Leninist Communists of Greece Οργάνωση Κομμουνιστών Μαρξιστών-Λενινιστών Ελλάδας
- Founded: January 1982
- Dissolved: 1993
- Succeeded by: Movement for a United Communist Party of Greece
- Headquarters: Athens, Greece
- Newspaper: Revolution
- Ideology: Communism; Marxism–Leninism; Hoxhaism; Anti-revisionism

Website
- https://okmle.blogspot.com

A sample cover of Epanastasi (10/1983). In the first page a photo of Enver Hoxha in the occasion of his 75th birthday

The Organisation of Marxist–Leninist Communists of Greece (Greek: Οργάνωση Κομμουνιστών Μαρξιστών-Λενινιστών Ελλάδας, ΟΚΜΛΕ; OKMLE) was a minor Greek communist organisation which was established in January 1982.

The organisation merged into the Movement for a United Communist Party of Greece in 1993–composed of exiled Greek communists from the former Soviet Union and other ex-socialist countries, old EAM-ELAS soldiers and officers. Followers of Nikolaos Zachariadis who had disconnected with Communist Party of Greece (KKE) after its destalinization the period 1953-1956 have also formed the Movement for a United Communist Party of Greece, which later became the main core for the Movement for the Reorganization of the Communist Party of Greece 1918–1955.

Ideologically, OKMLE upheld the political line of the Albanian Party of Labour.

The organization published a monthly newspaper called Epanastasi (Greek: Επανάσταση, Revolution).

OKMLE did not participate in any elections.

== See also ==
- List of anti-revisionist groups
- Politics of Greece
