= Maoist Bolshevik Reorganisation Movement of the Purba Banglar Sarbahara Party =

Maoist Bolshevik Reconstruction Movement of Proletarian Party of East Bengal পূর্ববাংলার সর্বহারা পার্টির মাওবাদী বলশেভিক পুনর্গঠন আন্দোলন
- Abbreviation: Pubaspa-MBRM
- Founded: 2001
- Ideology: Communism; Marxism–Leninism–Maoism; Anti-revisionism
- Political position: Far-left
- International affiliation: Revolutionary Internationalist Movement; CCOMPOSA
- Colors: Red
- Seats in the Jatiya Sangsad: 0 / 350

Party flag

Website
- https://pbspmbrm.wordpress.com/

Maoist Bolshevik Reorganisation Movement of the Purba Banglar Sarbahara Party (Bengali: পূর্ববাংলার সর্বহারা পার্টি – মাওবাদী বলশেভিক পুনর্গঠন আন্দোলন) is an underground Marxist–Leninist–Maoist party in Bangladesh. It was formed in 2001, following a split from the Purba Banglar Sarbahara Party. Following the formation of PBSP (MBRM), the party revived the agrarian struggles of PBSP in the Rajbari area, seizing 3,000 bighas of land and distributing them among landless peasants. Two police camps were set up in the area to counter the influence of the party.

PBSP(MBRM) attended the 2004 CCOMPOSA conference as an observer. Moreover, the group has initiated contacts with the Maoist sectors that considers the Revolutionary Internationalist Movement as having taken a liquidationist direction. In November 2004 PBSP(MBRM) took part in an international conference in Malmö, Sweden, which was organized by opponents to the RIM leadership.

In November 2015, Sahinur Rahman, described as a 'top leader' of the party, was killed by police in Rajbari. In April 2018, Saidul, a local commander of the party in Rajbari, was killed by police.

== See also ==
- List of anti-revisionist groups
