= Movement for a United Communist Party of Greece =

Movement for a United Communist Party of Greece Κίνηση για Ενιαίο ΚΚΕ
- Founded: 1993
- Dissolved: 1996
- Preceded by: Organisation of Marxist–Leninist Communists of Greece
- Succeeded by: Movement for the Reorganization of the Communist Party of Greece 1918–1955
- Headquarters: Athens, Greece
- Newspaper: Φωνή της Αλήθειας (Voice of Truth)
- Ideology: Communism; Marxism–Leninism; Hoxhaism; Anti-revisionism
- International affiliation: ICMLPO

Website
- http://eniaiokke.blogspot.com

Voice of Truth was published biweekly. On the first page of this issue the reader can see a photo of Nikos Zachariadis. In this 1994 issue the main article is dealing with the international relations between Greece and Albania.

The Movement for a United Communist Party of Greece (Greek: Κίνηση για Ενιαίο ΚΚΕ) was a minor Greek political organisation.

The movement was established in 1993 as the union of the pro-Albanian Organisation of Marxist-Leninist Communists of Greece (OKMLE -not to be confused with OMLE) and exiled Greek communists from the former Soviet Union and other ex-socialist countries, old EAM-ELAS soldiers and officers, followers of Nikolaos Zachariadis who disconnected with Communist Party of Greece (KKE) after its De-Stalinization the period 1953–1956.

It was a Stalinist organization which struggled for the unification of all Greek communists in one Marxist–Leninist party.

In 1996, it merged with communists publishing the newspaper Post-Soviet Epoch and other independent Greek Stalinists to form Movement for the Reorganization of the Communist Party of Greece 1918-55.

The organization published a biweekly, four-page newspaper called Voice of Truth (Greek: Φωνή της Αλήθειας) with size 28 cm x 31.5 cm. The first issue published in July 1993 and the last in August 1996. There were 63 issues published in total.

It never participated in any elections.

== See also ==
- Politics of Greece
- List of anti-revisionist groups
