= Municipal Left =

Municipal Left can refer to the following political parties:

- Municipal Left (Laxå), in Laxå Municipality, Sweden
- Municipal Left (Mariestad), in Mariestad Municipality, Sweden
