= Communist Party of Sweden =

The name Communist Party of Sweden (Swedish: Sveriges Kommunistiska Parti, abbreviated SKP) has been used by several political parties in Sweden:

- Left Party (Sweden), known as the Communist Party of Sweden (SKP) from 1921 to 1967
  - Communist Party of Sweden (1924), led by Zeth Höglund, split off from the main SKP in 1924 and later merged with the Social Democrats in 1926
  - Socialist Party (Sweden, 1929) (Kilbohmarna), split off from the main SKP in 1929 and was expelled from the Communist International the same year, dissolved in 1948
  - Communist Party of Sweden (1967) (KFML), a Maoist party called the Communist Party of Sweden between 1973 and 1987
    - Communist Party (Sweden) (Kommunistiska Partiet), an anti-revisionist party founded in 1970
    - Communist Workers' Party of Sweden (SKA), an anti-Deng Xiaoping party formed in 1980 and dissolved in 1993
      - Communist Party in Sweden (KPS), a pro-Albanian dissenter group formed in 1982 and dissolved in 1993
  - Communist Party of Sweden (1995), a group previously known as The Workers' Party – The Communists (APK)
- Marxist–Leninist Struggle League for the Communist Party of Sweden (M–L), formed in 1970 by Vänsterns Ungdomsförbund, the youth organization of the VPK
