= 1980 International Conference of Marxist–Leninist Parties and Organisations =

In 1980, an International Conference of Marxist–Leninist Parties and Organisations was organized by communist groups dissatisfied with the new leadership in China after the death of Mao Zedong and the overthrow of the Gang of Four. Participants were:

- Ceylon Communist Party (Maoist)
- Leninist Group of Senegal
- Group for the Defense of Marxism–Leninism (Spain)
- Mao Tse-Tung Circle (Denmark)
- Marxist–Leninist Collective (Britain)
- Marxist–Leninist Proletarian Communist Organization (Italy)
- Revolutionary Communist Party of Chile
- Reorganisation Committee CPI(ML)
- For the Proletarian International (France)
- Revolutionary Communist Party, USA
- Revolutionary Communist Union (Dominican Republic)

The conference constituted a 'Revolutionary International Committee' (precursor to the Revolutionary Internationalist Movement), and issued "To the Marxist-Leninist, the Workers and the Oppressed of all countries".

== Sources ==
- Rawal, Bhim Bahadur. Nepalma samyabadi andolan: udbhab ra vikas. Kathmandu: Pairavi Prakashan. p. 137-138.
