= Communist Party in Sweden =

Communist Party in Sweden Kommunistiska Partiet i Sverige
- Founded: 1982
- Dissolved: 1993
- Newspaper: Kommunisten
- Ideology: Communism; Marxism-Leninism; Anti-revisionism; Hoxhaism

Kommunistiska Partiet i Sverige (English: Communist Party in Sweden) was a pro-Albanian communist party in Sweden. KPS was formed in 1982. It was dissolved in 1993.

In 1978, a pro-Albanian group had broken away from the Communist Party of Sweden due to disagreements arising from the Sino-Albanian split. This group formed Norrköpings Kommunistiska Förening (Communist Association of Norrköping). In 1979 NKF merged with Stockholms Kommunistiska Enhetsgrupp to form Sveriges Kommunistiska Förbund - ml (Communist League of Sweden - ml). The magazine Kommunisten started publication in 1979. SKF-ml founded Organisationen för skapandet av Kommunistiska Partiet i Sverige (Organization for the creation of the Communist Party in Sweden) in October 1981. This organization later gave birth to KPS.

The leader of KPS was Anders Persson.

The youth league of KPS was called Ungkommunisterna i Sverige (Young Communists in Sweden). KPS maintained a publishing house called Kommunistiska Arbetarförlaget (Communist Workers Publishing House).

A series of expulsions 1983-1984 led to the refoundation of the NKF.

KPS considered parties like VPK, APK and KPML(r) as revisionist. The latter was described as the "left-wing alibi of Moscow in Sweden". KPS urged communists to struggle against both the United States and the USSR.

Gradually KPS started to distance itself from the Albanian line, somewhat similar to the development of the Nicaraguan MAP-ML.

In 1989, KPS suffered a major split, with a large section leaving the party. The splinters started a magazine called Vänstertidningen (Left Magazine), which was supposed to be a broader non-party marxist, socialist and ecologist forum. It disappeared rapidly.

At its height the party only reached in the low hundreds of members and sympathisers, and eventually dissolved in 1993.

The publication Kommunisten was later fused with Kommunistiska Arbetartidningen of Sveriges Kommunistiska Parti (Marxist-Leninisterna) to form Nya Arbetartidningen.

== See also ==
- List of anti-revisionist groups
