= Japanese Communist Party (Action Faction) =

- Founded: 1980
- Preceded by: Japan Communist Party (Marxist–Leninist)
- Ideology: Communism; Marxism–Leninism; Stalinism; Maoism; Anti-revisionism
- Political position: Far-left
- National affiliation: Japanese People's Front

Website
- https://www.jinminsensen.com/

The Japanese Communist Party (Action Faction) (日本共産党 (行動派)) is an anti-revisionist Marxist–Leninist communist party in Japan that was founded in 1980 by former members of the Japan Communist Party (Marxist–Leninist). JCP (Action Faction) adheres to Marxism–Leninism and Maoism, as well as the thought of Kyuichi Tokuda (徳田 球一)) and Otake Reichirou (大武 礼一郎)). The popular front of the JCP (Action Faction) is the Japanese People's Front (日本人民戦線)).

== See also ==
- List of anti-revisionist groups
