= List of solidarity rallies with the Gezi Park protests =

International reactions to the Gezi Park protests in Turkey included many expressions of concern about the excessive use of force against peaceful protestors. There were also supporting protests in a number of countries outside Turkey, particularly those with a large Turkish diaspora.

== Supporting protests ==
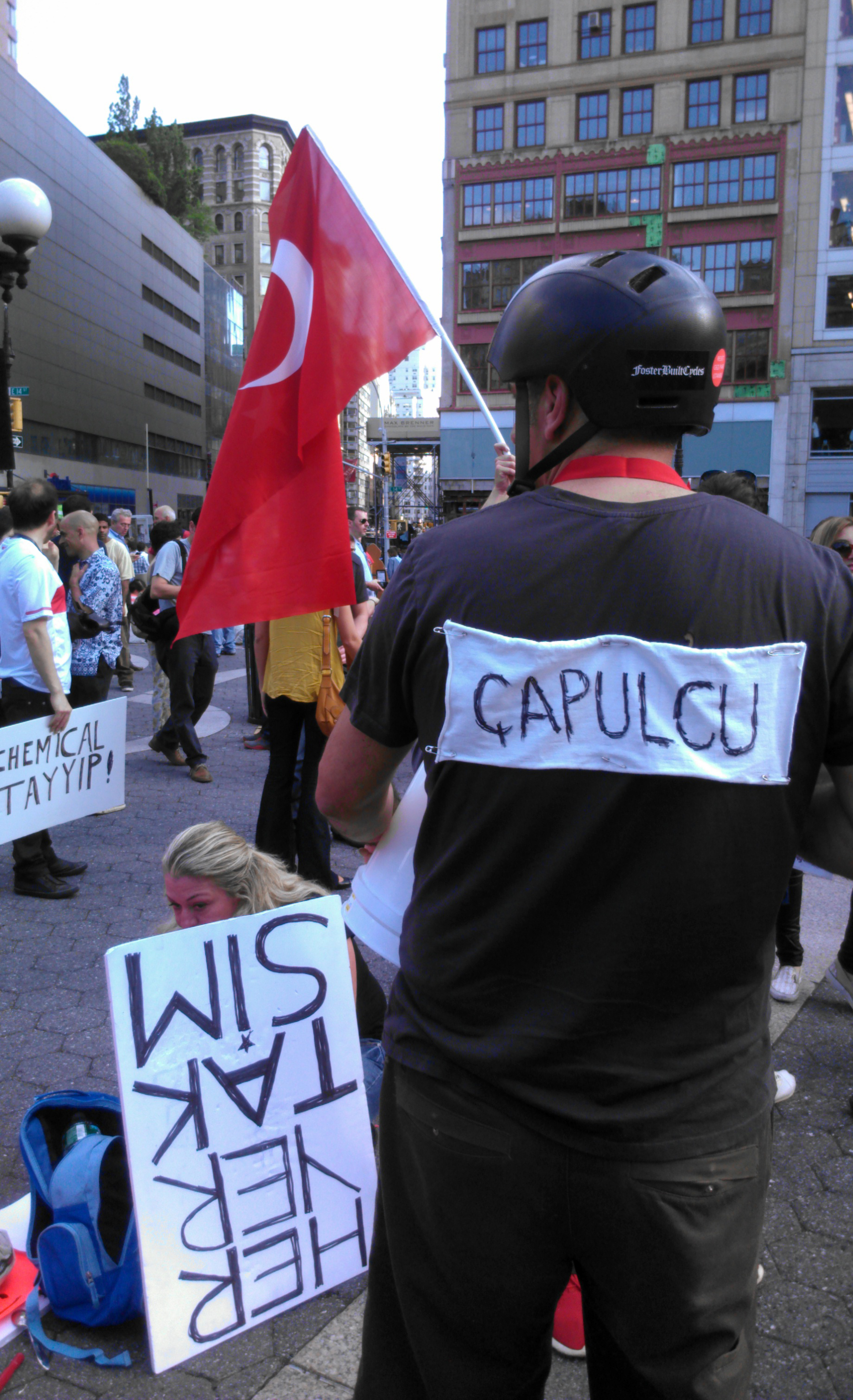
Protesters in New York City's Union Square Park.

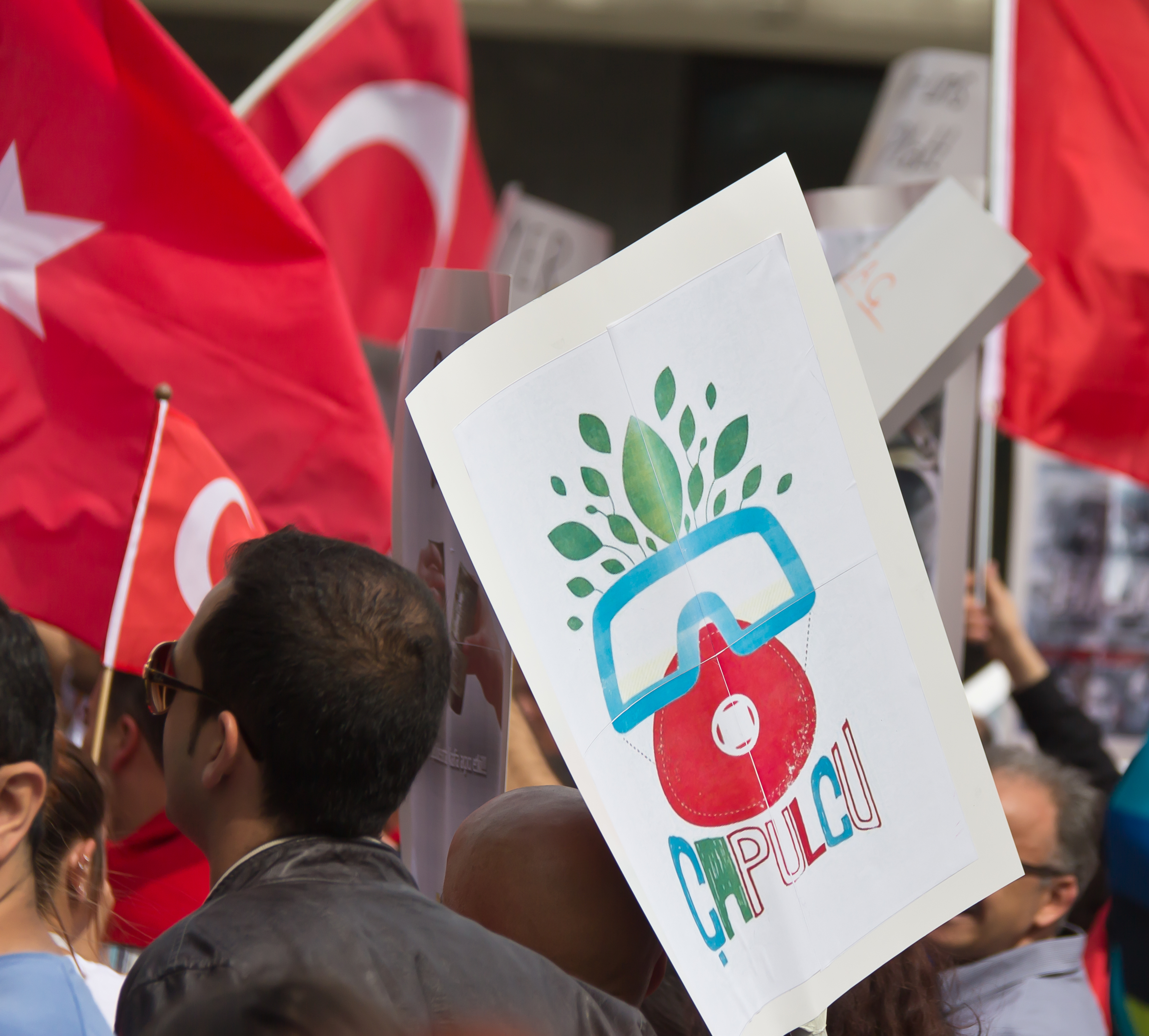
Supporting protest in Cologne, Germany, 15 June 2013.

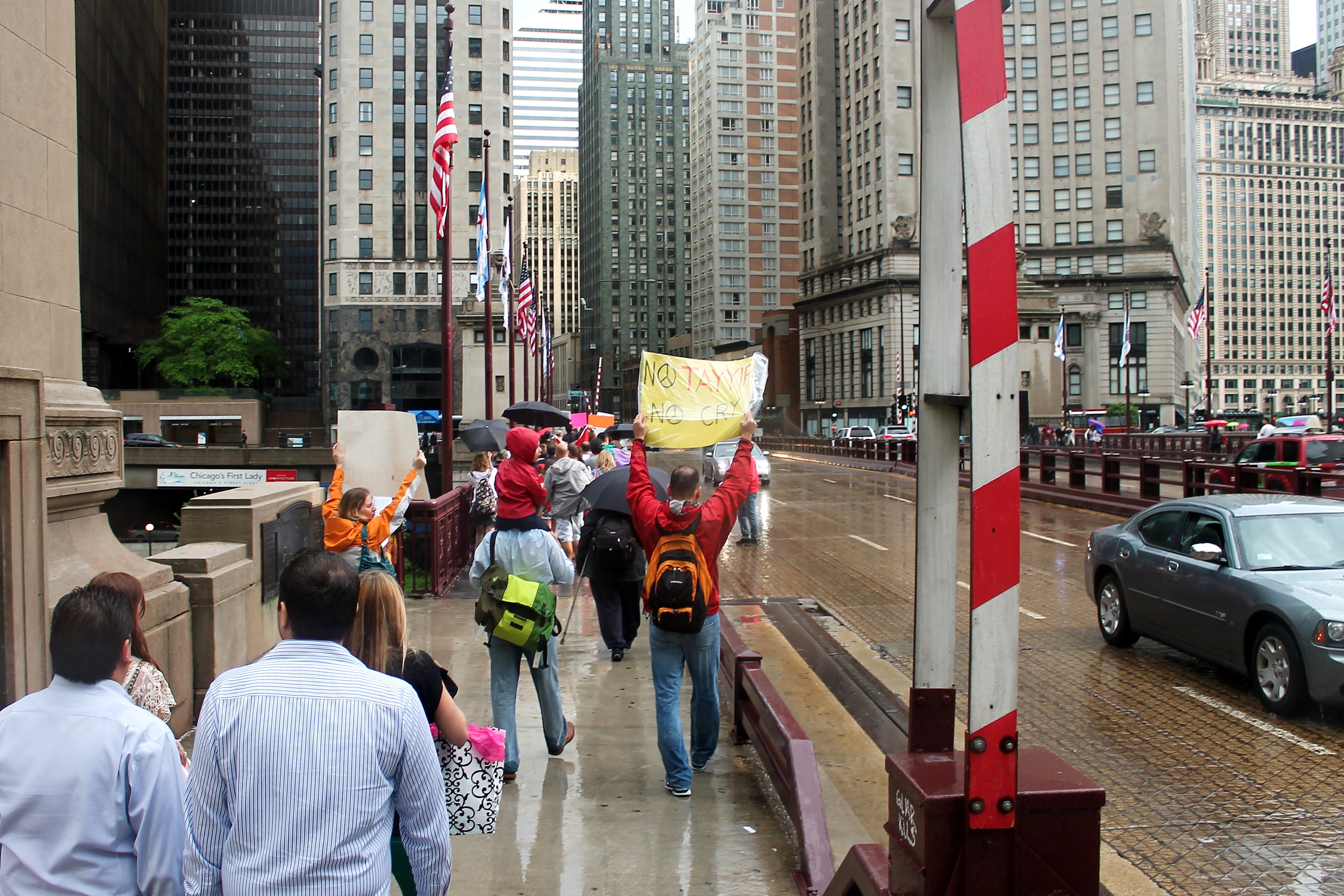
In Chicago, this protester is holding a sign that says No Tayyip, No Cry.

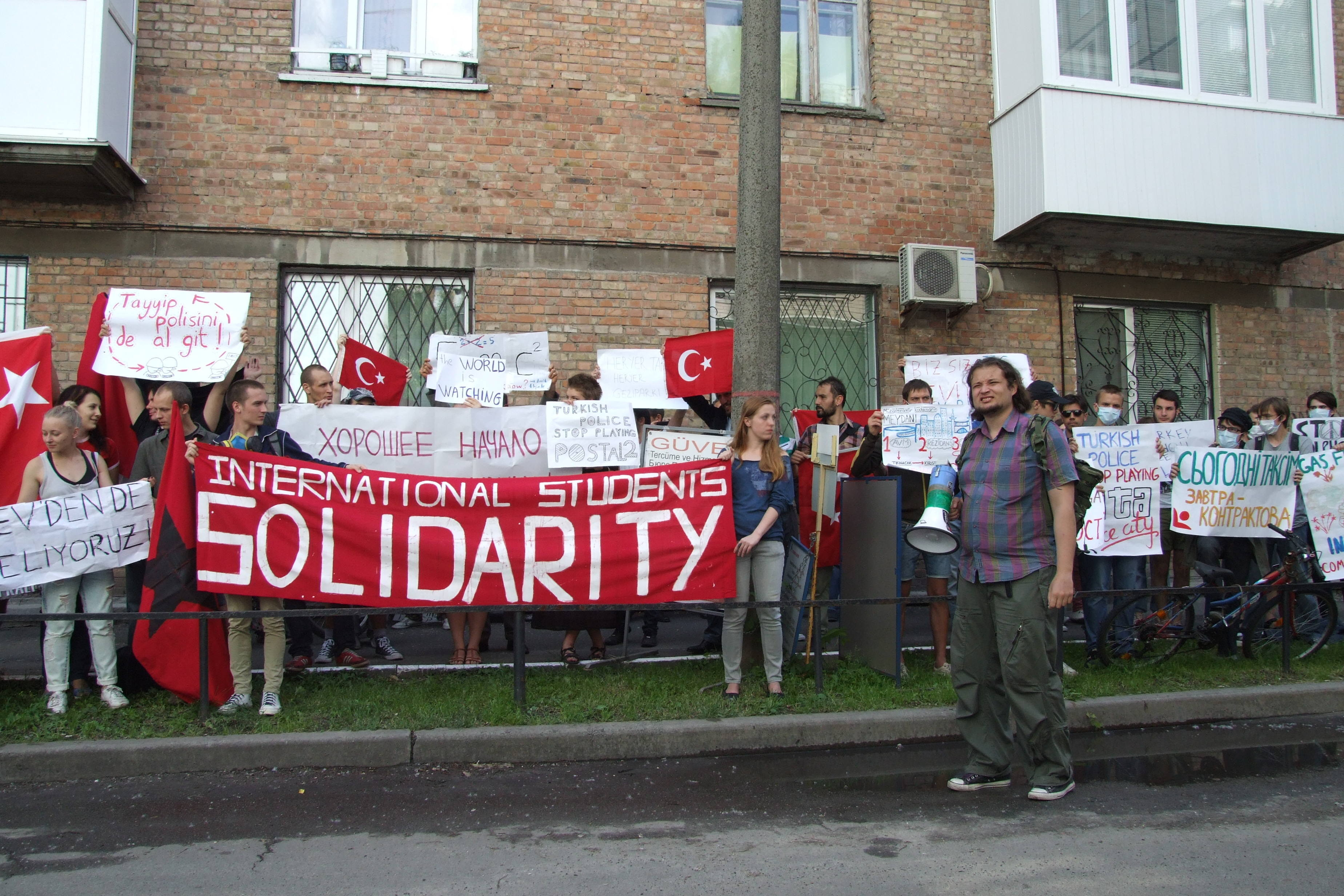
Protesters in front of Kyiv's Turkish embassy.

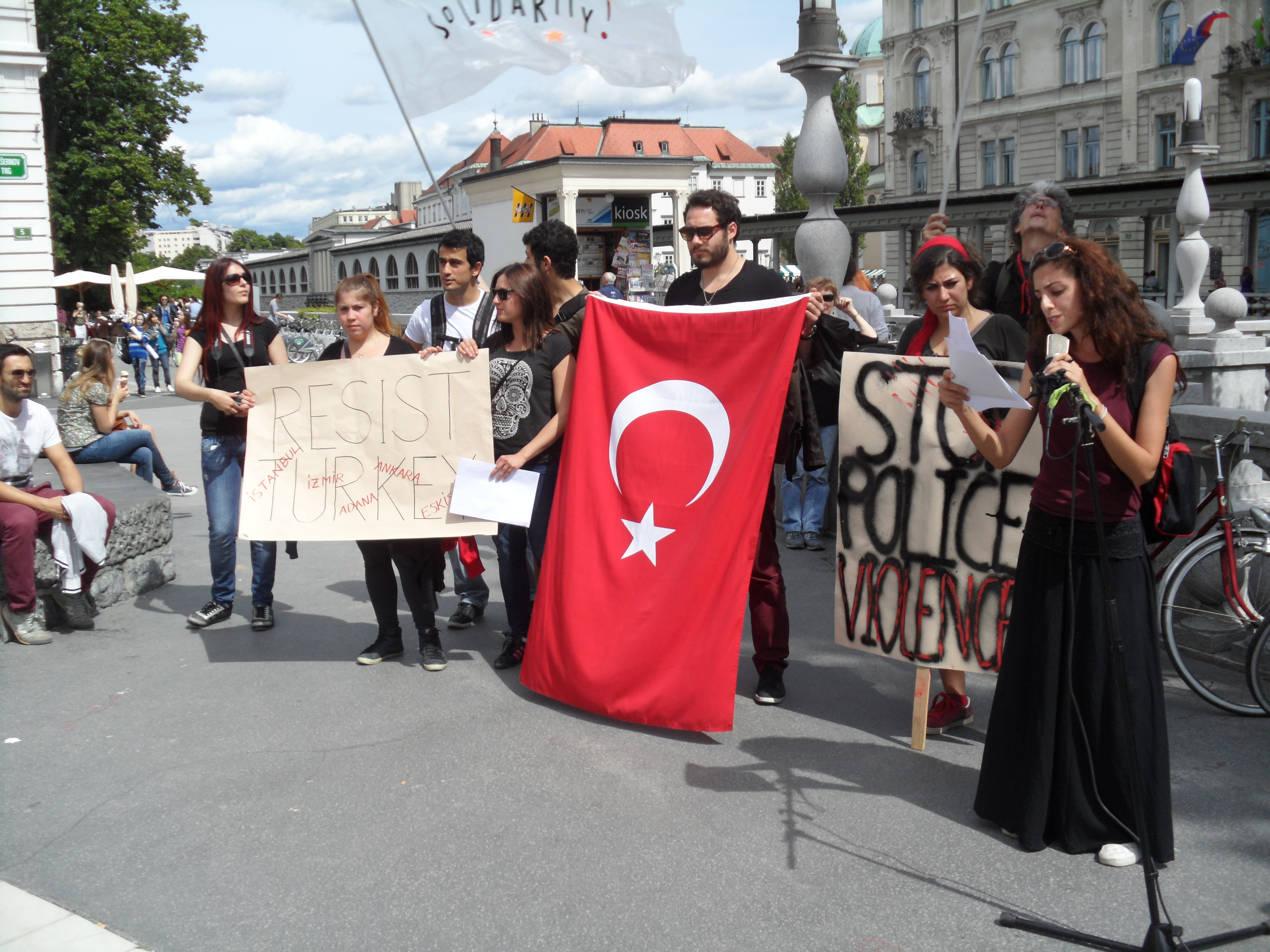
Protesters Ljubljana.

Supporting protests in cities of the Turkish diaspora and solidarity movements:

- In Szeged, Hungary around 70 students demonstrated against Erdoğan's government and supported the Turkish protestors.
- On 1 June, people rallied in San Francisco, Chicago, San Diego, New York City and Washington D.C. in support of the protesters.
- In Bulgaria, dozens of Turkish students protested in the capital Sofia on 1 June 2013. Later on the same day a rally in solidarity with the protesters in Istanbul was held in front of Turkey's Embassy in Sofia by Zelenite (The Greens) – a young activist-based political party, member of the European Green Party. Bulgarian students and nature protection activists joined the rally.
- In Amsterdam, Netherlands over a thousand Turks and sympathizers demonstrated on the Beursplein for two consecutive days. Also, 200 Turks protested in Eindhoven on 2 June 2013. Other protests were held in Rotterdam and Arnhem among other cities.
- In Baku, Azerbaijan, a group of 50–60 Turks protested on 1 June for forty minutes until dispersed by the police.
- In Brussels, Belgium, over a hundred Turks protested on 1 June 2013, expressing their solidarity.
- In Bucharest, Romania, a demonstration also took place on 2 June.
- In Milan, up to three hundred protesters of Turkish and other descents marched from Parco Sempione to Piazza Duomo, chanting "enough of Fascism, enough of Erdoğan" and "end violence in Istanbul".
- In Geneva, Zurich, Bern and Basel hundreds of Turks who live in Switzerland protested on 1–3 June 2013, expressing their solidarity.
- In Berlin, Hamburg, Munich, Köln, Bielefeld, Mannheim and Stuttgart, Germany solidarity protests took place on 1 June 2013.
- In Vienna, Austria on 31 June people gathered Stefansplatz to protest the government. Nearly 200 people were there. Later on, More than 4000 people have gathered at Karlsplatz and then Stadtpark to show support for the protests in Istanbul on 1 June 2013.Also on 3 June, nearly 600 people gathered in Schwarzenbergplatz and they marched to the Turkish Embassy in Vienna. On 4th Of June, once again people were gathered to walk to the Turkish Consulate. The protests are still continuing, on Friday the 7th there will be the 4th Protest in Vienna, also on Sunday the 9th, people will gather once again in Stephansplatz to create a FlashMob.
- In Los Angeles, United States on 4 June people gathered in front of the CNN headquarters to support the protestors. Nearly 50 people gathered and left an informing flyer to CNN reporter Christiane Amanpour.
- In Paris, France hundreds gathered to show support and demonstrated on Esplanade du Trocadéro on the 1st and 2 June.
- In Tel Aviv, Israel, an Amnesty International worker organized a protest of several dozen human rights activists, including some Turkish Israelis, outside the Turkish embassy on 2 June 2013, to show solidarity with the protestors.
- Turks and Turkish Cypriots in Northern Cyprus showed solidarity with the protesters, and held their own demonstration in Kuğulu Park, North Nicosia.
- In London, United Kingdom, over a thousand people demonstrated in Hyde Park on 1 June. A growing number of attendants keep protesting the ongoing police violence on a daily basis as of 3 June 2013.
- In New York City, United States, over a thousand people demonstrated in Zucotti Park on 1 June. The protests continued on 2 June in Zucotti Park. The protests continued on June 3, with hundreds of supporters taking a stand in front of the Turkish Consulate located on 50th Street and 3rd Ave.
- In Boston, United States, about 500 people demonstrated at the Massachusetts State House on 1 June. The protests continued on 5 June in front of the Turkish Consulate of Boston.
- In Charlotte, North Carolina, United States, the Turkish-American Society showed support by gathering at the Latta Park near the uptown area. A bigger, more organized event is scheduled to take place on June 8, 2013 at the heart of the city, on Trade & Tryon Streets.
- In Denmark, dozens of people gathered in Copenhagen near city hall on 1 June for demonstration.
- In Ottawa, Ontario, Canada, over a hundred people demonstrated on Parliament Hill on June 2, asking for international support for an immediate end to police violence.
- In Montreal, Quebec's Mont-Royal Park and Toronto, Ontario's Queens Park, in Canada, more than two hundred people demonstrated. In Montreal, the demonstrators decided to do a sit-in every Sunday at the same hour at Parc Mont-Royal, until the Turkish PM resigns.
- In Vancouver, British Columbia, Canada, a group of Turkish people demonstrated on the Georgia Street side of the Vancouver Art Gallery.
- In Poznań, Poland, a small group of Turkish students protested on 3 June to support the resistance in Gezi Park.
- In Dublin, Ireland, dozens of Turks protested on 1 June to support the resistance in Gezi Park.
- In Prague, Czech Republic, nearly 30-35 people protested Turkish government.
- In Athens (3 June) and Thessaloniki (2 June) around 1000 Greek leftists marched in solidarity along with Turkish and Kurdish immigrants and expatriates. In Komotini and Xanthi a few hundred local Turks and Greeks marched in solidarity.
- In Tokyo, Japan, over fifty Turks living in Japan demonstrated on June 2.
- In China, protests have been held in Beijing, Shanghai and Guangzhou.
- In Jakarta, Indonesia, nearly 25 Turks showed their opposition to the Turkish government.
- In Floriana, Malta, 25-30 Turkish students showed solidarity with Gezi Parkı rioters.
- In Bangkok, Thailand, nearly 50 Turks protested police violence against rioters.
- In Tbilisi, Georgia, nearly 50 citizens showed solidarity with Gezi Parkı rioters.
- On 1 June, people rallied in San Francisco, Chicago, San Diego, New York City and Washington D.C. in support of the protesters. A demonstration also took place in Bucharest the following day.
- In Buenos Aires, Argentina, a dozen of Turks protested on 1 June to support the resistance in Gezi Park.
- In Seattle, United States, more than 200 Turks held a peaceful demonstration at Westlake Park on 31 May 2013 to show their solidarity with the movement in Turkey, as well as to raise local awareness about the issue.
- In Ann Arbor, United States, a group of more than 100 Turks and internationals gathered in front of the post office on East Liberty Street, on June 1, 2013, to protest police violence in solidarity with Gezi Park and to raise awareness in the city.
- In Oxford, A solidarity protest by Turkish students at Oxford University was heldon June 2, 2013.
- In Belgrade, small-scale protests were organised in the vicinity of the Turkish Embassy on 4 June
- In Aleppo, Syria, on June 7, 2013, the people of al-Azizyeh neighborhood took to the streets to express condemnation of the policies of Turkish Prime Minister Recep Tayyip Erdoğan against the Syrian and Turkish people.
- In Madrid, Spain, there was a concentration in Sol Square supporting Turkish people
- In Santiago, Chile, the Chilean Communist Party (Proletarian Action) held a protest in front of the Turkish Embassy on June 8, 2013, supporting the protests against Erdoğan's regime
- In Washington D.C., on June 8, 2013, a group of more than 250 people held a peaceful demonstration in front of the White House to show their solidarity with Gezi Park and raise awareness about the issue.
- In Providence, Rhode Island, United States, on the afternoon of June 9, 2013 more than 50 Turks in ages ranging from young school children to the elderly held a peaceful demonstration in front of the Rhode Island State House to show their solidarity with the Gezi Park movement in Turkey. They held up banners supporting human rights and displayed photos of the demonstrations in Turkey to raise awareness about the issues. There was local TV and newspaper coverage of the day's event.
- In Oslo, Norway, about 50 Turks gathered outside the building of VG on 4 June to thank the newspaper for broadcasting the protests in Turkey live; the group voiced support for the Turkish protesters.
- In Toronto, Ontario, Canada, there have been 3 different peaceful demonstrations, taking place on May 31, 2013, June 2, 2013 and June 9, 2013. Over 500 Turkish-Canadians and supporters of the movement participated in these demonstrations.
- In Munich, Germany, about 600 Turks gathered in Odeonsplatz, taking place on June 1, 2013. A second protest was held in Karlsplatz (Stachus) on June 8, 2013.
- In Hong Kong, China, about 50 protesters of Hong Kong's Turkish expatriate community gathered along the Tsim Sha Tsui harbourfront yesterday to show solidarity for their compatriots.
- In Damascus, Syria, on June 18, 2013, a crowd of people staged a sit-in outside the Turkish Embassy in Syria to express solidarity with the Turkish protesters.
- In Tartous, Syria, on June 25, 2013, hundreds of citizens organized a rally in solidarity with the Turkish people against the policies of the Turkish Prime Minister Recep Tayyip Erdogan.
- In Wien, Austria on June 16, 2013, thousands of people from different nationalities gathered under a support concert for Taksim, Istanbul and Turkey protests from 15.00 to 22.00 under the name of "Kunst für Widerstand" (Art for Resistance).
