= Revolutionary Internationalist Contingent =

Former Maoist group in Britain

The Revolutionary Internationalist Contingent was a small Maoist group in Britain, founded in 1986 after the failure of the Nottingham Communist Group and Stockport Communist Group to form a united organisation by means of a programme commission. The basic programmatic document of the group was Break the Chains! The group suffered a split in 1987.

Internationally, the RIC was aligned with the Revolutionary Internationalist Movement. A London-based group calling itself "Supporters of the RIM in Britain" continued to produce a journal from 1988 to 1991.
