= Communist Youth of Sweden =

Youth wing of the Communist Party of Sweden (SKP)

Communist Youth of Sweden Sveriges kommunistiska ungdomsförbund
- Chairman: Erik Brindbergs
- Founded: 2000
- Headquarters: Södra Förstadsgatan 132, Malmö
- Ideology: Communism; Marxism–Leninism; Hard Euroscepticism; Anti-revisionism
- Mother party: Communist Party of Sweden
- International affiliation: WFDY

Communist Youth of Sweden (Sveriges kommunistiska ungdomsförbund) or SKU is the youth wing of the Communist Party of Sweden (SKP). It was founded in 2000. The organization is a member of the World Federation of Democratic Youth.

SKU considers itself to represent the Swedish young communist tradition, and like Ung Vänster, 1903 is seen as the founding date of the movement.

SKU was an independent communist youth organization from 1990 when it broke away from AKP (later reorganized into the SKP in 1995) until it was reorganized back into SKP as the party youth league in 2000

SKU has sections of the organization in Stockholm, Lund and Karlstad. They also have a rural organization (Landsbygd organization)

== Leaders ==
Martin Tairi (August 29th 2021 - August 3rd 2025)

Erik Brindbergs (August 3rd 2025 - Present)
