= Communist League of Austria =

- Founded: 6 August 1976
- Newspaper: Klassenkampf
- Ideology: Communism; Marxism-Leninism; Maoism; Anti-revisionism
- Political position: Far-left

The Communist League of Austria (German: Kommunistischer Bund Österreichs) was a pro-China communist group in Austria. The KBÖ was founded on 6 August 1976 in Vienna.

The first congress of KBÖ was held in January 1978. Walter Lindner was reelected as the Central Committee Secretary.

KBÖ published the Klassenkampf (biweekly, 1978 weekly) and the theoretical journal Kommunist (monthly).

KBÖ strongly opposed the Soviet Union, denouncing it as "social-imperialist". The KBÖ organized rallies outside the Soviet embassy in Vienna.

In 1980 KBÖ split into two factions, which both continued to use the name KBÖ.

== See also ==
- List of anti-revisionist groups
