= Marxist–Leninist Organization of Afghanistan =

Marxist–Leninist Organization of Afghanistan سازمان مارکسیست-لنینیست افغانستان
- Ideology: Communism; Marxism–Leninism; Mao Zedong Thought; Anti-revisionism
- Political position: Far-left
- International affiliation: ICOR; ICMLPO (defunct)

The Marxist–Leninist Organization of Afghanistan (Dari: سازمان مارکسیست-لنینیست افغانستان; abbr. MLOA) is a Marxist-Leninist and Maoist political organization in Afghanistan. It participated in the International Conference of Marxist–Leninist Parties and Organizations (International Newsletter) (ICMLPO).

The MLOA has been publishing the journal Eagle (عقاب) since August 2011.

== See also ==
- List of anti-revisionist groups
