= Communist Party of Bangladesh (Marxist–Leninist) (Dutta) =

Communist Party of Bangladesh (Marxist–Leninist) বাংলাদেশের সাম্যবাদী দল (মার্কসবাদী-লেনিনবাদী)
- Abbreviation: BSD(ML)
- Leader: Ajay Dutta
- Split from: Communist Party of Bangladesh (Marxist–Leninist)
- Newspaper: Porjash
- Ideology: Communism; Marxism–Leninism; Maoism
- Political position: Far-left
- Regional affiliation: CCOMPOSA
- International affiliation: RIM (defunct)

The Communist Party of Bangladesh (Marxist–Leninist) (abbreviated: BSD(ML), (Bengali: বাংলাদেশের সাম্যবাদী দল (মার্কসবাদী-লেনিনবাদী), romanized: Bangladesher Samyabadi Dal (Marksbadi–Leninbadi)) is a Marxist–Leninist party in Bangladesh led by Ajoy Dutta.

The party publishes the newspaper Porjash and is affiliated with the Revolutionary Internationalist Movement and CCOMPOSA.
