= New Albanian Party of Labour =

- Leader: Agim Xheka (1998-1999)
- Founded: 1998
- Dissolved: 1999
- Merged into: Party of United Communists of Albania
- Ideology: Communism; Anti-revisionism
- Political position: Far-left

The New Albanian Party of Labour (Albanian: Partia e Re e Punës së Shqipërisë) was a communist party in Albania. It was legalized in 1998, as the third communist party to obtain legal recognition post-1991. It was led by radio journalist Agim Xheka.

On 5 June 1999 the party merged into the Party of United Communists of Albania.
