= Marxist–Leninist Groups =

Marxist-Leninist Groups Marxilais-Leniniläiset Ryhmät
- Abbreviation: MLR
- Leader: Matti Puolakka
- Founded: 1973
- Dissolved: 1979
- Newspaper: Punakaarti; Okakuu
- Ideology: Communism; Marxism–Leninism; Maoism; Anti-revisionism
- Political position: Far-left

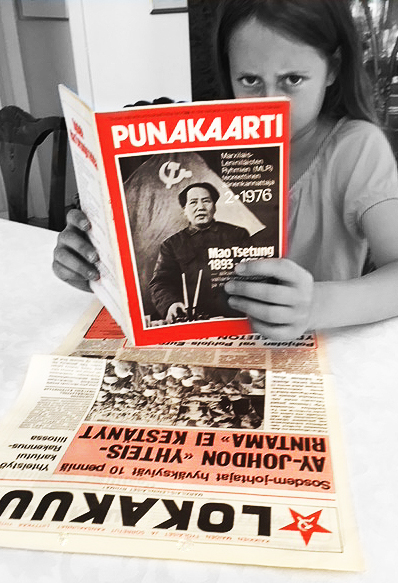
Punakaarti and Lokakuu papers published by MLR

Marxist–Leninist Groups (Finnish: Marxilais-Leniniläiset Ryhmät, MLR) was a Maoist organization in Finland. The MLR was active from 1973 until 1979. It had supporters in a few cities but it always remained a small current with fewer than 200 members. MLR had close contacts with the Chinese Communist Party and other Nordic Maoist parties.

MLR was founded early in 1973 to unite local Maoist groups in Finland. The Marxist-Leninist Society of Helsinki (HMLS), the first such group, had been active since the late 1960s. HMLS (like the whole MLR) was mainly active in the radical youth and student movement. The activities of the Maoists were closely followed by the Suojelupoliisi, the KGB and the Communist Party of Finland (SKP), which fiercely condemned the anti-Soviet movement. MLR was founded after the SKP began expulsing Maoist cadres from its ranks.

The organization published two papers, theoretical Punakaarti ("Red Guard", 1969–1977) and agitational Lokakuu ("October", 1972–1978). MLR had book shops named Lokakuu in Helsinki, Turku and Rauma. In the series Marxismin klassikoita ("Classics of Marxism") MLR published works by Joseph Stalin, Mao Zedong, Enver Hoxha and Karl Marx.

Many of the members who disbanded the MLR in 1979, including its leader Matti Puolakka went to form Alternative Movement Itu (Finnish: Vaihtoehtoliike Itu), which soon began moving away from Marxism-Leninism.

== See also ==
- List of anti-revisionist groups
