= Syrian Communist Party (disambiguation) =

The Syrian Communist Party was a political party that existed from 1944 until an internal split in 1986. It may also refer to:

- One of the two parties that emerged from the 1986 split:
  - Syrian Communist Party (Bakdash)
  - Syrian Communist Party (Unified)
- One of the three parties that splintered off amid the Sino-Soviet split:
  - Arab Communist Party
  - Communist Labour Party
  - Syrian Communist Party (Political Bureau)
- The Syrian–Lebanese Communist Party, the predecessor to the Syrian Communist Party
