= SKP =

SKP may refer to:

== Organisations ==
- Communist Party of Finland (Suomen Kommunistinen Puolue)
- Communist Party of Finland (1994) (Suomen Kommunistinen Puolue)
- Communist Party of Georgia (Sakartvelos Komunisturi Partia)
- Communist Party of Sweden (disambiguation) (Sveriges Kommunistiska Parti), several parties at different times

== Science and technology ==
- Scanning Kelvin probe, a microscopy technique
- SketchUp program file format

== Other uses ==
- Skopje International Airport (IATA code: SKP), North Macedonia
