= Communist Unity Groups (Sweden) =

- Founded: 1975
- Dissolved: 1977
- Split from: KPML(r)
- Newspaper: Enhet
- Ideology: Marxism-Leninism

Kommunistiska Enhetsgrupperna (English: Communist Unity Groups) was a section that left Kommunistiska Partiet Marxist-Leninisterna (revolutionärerna) in 1975. KEG considered that KPML(r):s politics towards the trade unions was ultra-leftist and sectarian. KEG was dissolved in 1977, and most of the members later joined SKP.

The KEG group in Stockholm, Stockholms Kommunistiska Enhetsgrupp, continued to exist until 1979. In that year SKEG merged with the Communist Association of Norrköping to form SKF-ml.

KEG published Enhet ('Unity') 1975–1977.
