= Coordination Committee of Maoist Parties and Organisations of South Asia =

South Asian Maoist umbrella organization

The Coordination Committee of Maoist Parties and Organizations of South Asia (CCOMPOSA) was an umbrella organization of various South Asian Marxist–Leninist and Maoist parties and movements. The Communist Party of Nepal-Maoist was one of the main actors involved in the founding of CCOMPOSA in 2001. Many CCOMPOSA members also belonged to the Revolutionary Internationalist Movement prior to its dissolution.

== Founding parties ==
Founding parties of CCOMPOSA included:

=== Bangladesh ===
- Purba Bangala Sarbahara Party (Central Committee)
- Purba Bangla Sarbahara Party (Maobadi Punargathan Kendra)
- Bangladesher Samyabadi Dal (Marksbadi-Leninbadi)
- Purba Banglar Communist Party - Marksbadi-Leninbadi (Lal Patakar)
- Purba Banglar Sarbahara Party (Maoist Bolshevik Reorganization Movement) (observer status)

=== Bhutan ===
- Communist Party of Bhutan (Marxist–Leninist–Maoist) (observer status)

=== India ===
- Communist Party of India (Marxist–Leninist) Naxalbari
- Maoist Communist Centre
- Revolutionary Communist Centre of India (Marxist–Leninist–Maoist)
- Revolutionary Communist Centre of India (Maoist)
- Communist Party of India (Marxist–Leninist) People's War

Note: Revolutionary Communist Centre of India (Maoist) and Maoist Communist Centre merged in 2003 and became Maoist Communist Centre of India. In 2004 Maoist Communist Centre of India and Communist Party of India (Marxist–Leninist) People's War merged to become Communist Party of India (Maoist) which the Communist Party of India (Marxist–Leninist) Naxalbari also would merge into in 2014.

=== Nepal ===
- Communist Party of Nepal (Maoist)

=== Sri Lanka ===
- Ceylon Communist Party (Maoist)

== Declaration ==
At CCOMPOSA's second annual conference in 2002, a declaration was issued, outlining the vision CCOMPOSA had for its role in revolutionary politics, how it would operate, and how the political situation in South Asia and the world looked from their point of view. It was declared that the organization would follow the ideas carved by Karl Marx, Vladimir Lenin and Mao Zedong, and, not least, to build on the examples and experience of Protracted People's Wars in Peru, Nepal, the Philippines, India, Turkey and elsewhere.

== Fourth Conference ==
In August 2006, CCOMPOSA held its fourth conference in Nepal. Cailmail suggests that the CPN-M intended for this conference to build support within the international Maoist movement for the Comprehensive Peace Accord signed a few months later. Representatives of eight parties attended, including those of the Ceylon Communist Party (Maoist), who did not sign the resolutions. That has been taken as an indication that the CCP(M) was invited as an observer. The parties that participated in the conference were the following: Purba Bangala Sarbahara Party (Central Committee), Purba Banglar Communist Party - ML (Lal Patakar), Bangladesher Samyabadi Dal (ML) (all from Bangladesh), Communist Party of Bhutan (MLM), Communist Party of Nepal (Maoist), Communist Party of India (Maoist), Communist Party of India (ML) Naxalbari and Communist Party of India (MLM). The conference resolved that coordination would be deepened and extended, while asserting that Nepali Maoists would not meddle in the 'Indian People's War'.
