= Patriotic Union (Chile) =

Political party in Chile

Patriotic Union Unión Patriótica
- President: Eduardo Artés
- General Secretary: Luis Aravena Egaña
- Founded: 14 September 2015
- Legalised: 24 April 2016
- Dissolved: 3 February 2022
- Membership (2021): 33,246
- Ideology: Communism; Marxism–Leninism; Stalinism; Anti-revisionism; Socialist patriotism; Anti-imperialism
- Political position: Far-left
- Colors: Red and Blue

Patriotic Union (Spanish: Unión Patriótica, UPA) was a far-left Chilean political party. It was founded in September 2015 and was led by Eduardo Artés, general secretary of the Chilean Communist Party (Proletarian Action).

Legally registered in 2016, it first appeared in the municipal elections of that year. The party obtained 0.32% of the total votes but no candidates were elected to any council.

It was declared as an anti-imperialist, progressive, patriotic and populist party. Its leader has expressed sympathy with the government of North Korea and the government of President Nicolás Maduro in Venezuela.

For the 2017 elections, the party proclaimed Artés as its presidential candidate, where he finished in seventh place in the first round. The party was dissolved in 2018 for failing to get a minimum percentage of the vote. It was reregistered in 2019, but dissolved again in February 2022 after failing to obtain at least 5% of the vote in the 2021 parliamentary elections.

== Presidential candidates ==
The following is a list of the presidential candidates supported by the Patriotic Union. (Information gathered from the Archive of Chilean Elections).

- 2017: Eduardo Artés (lost)
- 2021: Eduardo Artés (lost)

== See also ==
- List of anti-revisionist groups
