= People's Resistance =

People's Resistance – Left Anti-imperialist Cooperation Λαϊκή Αντίσταση – Αριστερή Αντιιμπεριαλιστική Συνεργασία
- Founded: 2013
- Dissolved: 2020
- Ideology: Communism; Anti-revisionism; Marxism–Leninism
- Political position: Far-left
- Colours: Red

Website
- la-aas.blogspot.gr

The People's Resistance – Left Anti-imperialist Cooperation (Greek: Λαϊκή Αντίσταση – Αριστερή Αντιιμπεριαλιστική Συνεργασία, ΛΑ – ΑΑΣ; Laiki Antistasi – Aristeri Antiimperialistiki Synergasia, LA – AAS) was a coalition of Marxist-Leninist and anti-revisionist left political organisations in Greece. Communist Party of Greece (Marxist–Leninist) and Marxist–Leninist Communist Party of Greece were members of this cooperation. People's Resistance was founded in 2013 and dissolved in 2020.

== See also ==
- List of anti-revisionist groups
