= Japanese Communist Party (Left Faction) =

Maoist political party in Japan

- Founded: 1969
- Split from: Japanese Communist Party
- Ideology: Communism; Marxism–Leninism–Maoism; Anti-revisionism
- Political position: Far-left

Website
- 人民の星

The Japanese Communist Party (Left Faction) (日本共産党 (左派), Nihon Kyōsantō Saha) is a Marxist–Leninist–Maoist communist party in Japan. It was founded in 1969 centered on the Yamaguchi Prefecture Committee of the Japanese Communist Party, under the leadership of those who supported Fukuda Masayoshi (福田 正義).

Currently Maoist, it suffered a schism in 1975 when the Kantō faction of the party embraced the Hoxhaism of the New Zealand Communist Party while the Yamaguchi faction remained supportive of Maoism. The party reunified around Maoism in 1980.

== See also ==
- List of anti-revisionist groups
