= Revolutionary Communist Centre of India (Maoist) =

Revolutionary Communist Centre of India (Maoist), was a communist group based in Punjab. RCCI(M) was formed in 1995, as the Revolutionary Communist Centre of India (Marxist–Leninist) was divided into two (the other faction was the Revolutionary Communist Centre of India (Marxist–Leninist–Maoist)). The secretary of RCCI(M) was Shamsher Singh Sheri.

RCCI (M) held conferences in 1996 and 2002.

RCCI(M) was a candidate member of Revolutionary Internationalist Movement (RIM). It was also one of the founding organisations of the Coordination Committee of Maoist Parties and Organisations of South Asia. In January 2003 RCCI(M) merged with Maoist Communist Centre, which then took the name Maoist Communist Centre of India.
