= Marxist–Leninist Italian Communist Party =

Marxist-Leninist Italian Communist Party Partito Comunista Italiano Marxista-Leninista
- General Secretary: Gennaro Savio
- Founded: 3 December 1999
- Headquarters: Via Provinciale Panza, 37 - 80075 Forio (NA)
- Newspaper: Comunismo
- Ideology: Communism; Marxism-Leninism; Stalinism; Anti-revisionism
- Political position: Far-left

Website
- https://www.pciml.net/

The Marxist–Leninist Italian Communist Party (Partito Comunista Italiano Marxista-Leninista, PCIM-L) is anti-revisionist Marxist-Leninist communist party in Italy. The party was founded on December 3, 1999 by the Centre of Marxist Culture and Initiative (Centro di Cultura e Iniziativa Marxista).

The party is based in Forio, a commune in the province of Naples. It was founded by Domenico Savio, an anti-revisionist communist who favors a strict interpretation of the ideology in accordance with the teachings of Karl Marx, Friedrich Engels, Vladimir Lenin and Joseph Stalin. In October 2004, Savio and his PCIM-L managed to obtain 2,244 votes (6.9%) during the Chamber of Deputies supplementary election in the college of Napoli 1 - Ischia.

In the 2006 general election PCI M-L ran a list in the Campania region for the Italian Senate, with Savio as the head of the list. PCIM-L got 26,029 votes (0.856% of the vote in that region, 0.08% of the national vote).

In May 2013 Savio ran for mayor of Forio, getting the 12,89% of votes and was elected as municipal councilor. In June 2018 Savio ran again for major of Forio, only getting 2,33% of votes and thus losing his seat.

On 13 March 2020 Domenico Savio died at eighty years of age, and the party is now headed by his son Gennaro Savio.

== See also ==
- List of anti-revisionist groups
