= Communist League of Luxembourg =

Defunct political party in Luxembourg

Communist League of Luxembourg Kommunistischer Bund Luxemburg Kommunistesche Bond Letzeburg
- Founded: 1972
- Dissolved: 1980
- Ideology: Communism; Marxism-Leninism; Maoism; Anti-revisionism
- Political position: Far-left

Communist League of Luxembourg (German: Kommunistischer Bund Luxemburg, Luxembourgish: Kommunistesche Bond Lëtzebuerg), was an anti-revisionist Marxist-Leninist political organization in Luxembourg. Forerunner of the KBL was the Association Générale des Etudiants Luxembourgeois (ASSOSS). ASSOSS was originally a left liberal organization founded in 1912 which moved leftward in the sixties. In 1969, it was transformed in the radical Gauche Socialiste et Révolutionnaire (GSR). After the split of the trotskyist Ligue Communiste Révolutionnaire (LCR) in 1970, the majority of GSR was renamed in KBL in 1972. In 1972, Kommunistische Gruppe Luxemburg (KGL) split from KBL. In 1975, Kommunistische Organisation Luxemburgs/Marxisten-Leninisten (KOL/ML) broke away but returned in 1978.

In 1979, KBL was the driving force behind the electoral Alternativ Lëscht – Wiert Iech which won 0,7 p.c. in the parliamentary elections. In the same year, the majority of KBL left and founded the short-lived organization Fir de Sozialismus. The KBL ceased activities in 1980.

The secretary of KBL was Charles Doerner. Other leading members were Jean Heisbourg, Robert Medernach, Lucien Blau, and Thers Bodé.

KBL published Rote Fahne and since 1977 Roude Fändel (Red Banner).

== See also ==
- List of anti-revisionist groups
