= Arab Communist Party =

Arab Communist Party الحزب الشيوعي العربي
- Founded: February 1968

The Arab Communist Party (Arabic: الحزب الشيوعي العربي), also known as the Arab Communist Marxist-Leninist Party in the Syrian Region (Arabic: الحزب الشيوعي العربي (الماركسي – اللينيني), was a banned underground anti-revisionist communist group in Syria. The establishment of the Preparatory Committee for the Arab Communist Party in Syria was announced to the Beirut press on February 22, 1968. The founding statement of the party argued that "[t]he evolution of the situation has demonstrated to the Syrian people the inadequacy and incapacity of the current political parties and groups to lead the country and resolve the nation’s vital problems—including the pro-Soviet Syrian Communist Party, which betrayed the cause of the Arab people by seeking to follow the instructions of Moscow to the letter. The revisionist committee of the Syrian Communist Party—like other revisionist communists throughout the Arab world—has worked to distort and downplay the class struggle by supporting certain military regimes, labeling them "anti-capitalist," "socialist," and "revolutionary." Experience has shown that it is impossible to reform a revisionist party from within, as the steering committees stifle any initiative arising from the grassroots, ensuring that democracy is not practiced inside the party. The declaration adds: It is therefore urgent to form a revolutionary party that adopts the Marxist-Leninist doctrine—as embodied today by Mao Zedong—the application of which should lead to the dictatorship of the proletariat within a revolutionary democracy. The primary goal of this party is to liberate the Arab homeland from imperialism and Israel, and to abolish the exploitation of the people by the ruling classes. This objective can only be achieved through the use of armed force, stemming from people's war, as defined by Comrade Mao Zedong. Syrian communists have joined together to establish a committee tasked with preparing for the birth of this new party".

The group possibly had its origins in the Arab Workers and Peasants Party, a loosely organized group that had emerged in the 1965. The group published a clandestine journal. Mimeographed circulars of the party denounced the Soviet Union for 'treason', called for people's war to liberate Arab lands and labelled Syria 'a fascist police state'. In October 1968 Syrian authorities reportedly carried out a crackdown on the group, arresting some 40 of its followers in different parts of the country.

== See also ==
- List of anti-revisionist groups
