= Bulgarian Workers' Party (Communist) =

Bulgarian Workers' Party/Communists/ Българска работническа партия/комунисти Bulgarska Rabotnicheska Partiya/Komunisti/
- Leader: Ivan Vodenicharski
- Founded: 2000
- Newspaper: Iskra
- Ideology: Communism; Marxism–Leninism; Stalinism
- Political position: Far-left
- International affiliation: ICOR
- Colours: Red

Website
- Official page on Facebook

The Bulgarian Workers' Party /Communists/ (Bulgarian: Българска работническа партия/комунисти/, Bulgarska Rabotnicheska Partiya/Komunisti/, BRP/k/) is a communist party in Bulgaria led by Ivan Vodenicharski.

Since their foundation in 2000, the party has participated in only one parliamentary election; in 2001, it received 12,579 votes (0.3%) and no seats. In 2003 it fielded candidates for 22 local councils, but fail to win any seats.

Internationally, BRP/k/ has been one of the founding members of the International Coordination of Revolutionary Parties and Organizations (ICOR) and remains one of its 62 members.

== See also ==
- List of anti-revisionist groups
