= Revolutionary Communist Party (Chile) =

Revolutionary Communist Party Partido Comunista Revolucionario
- Founded: 16 February 1966
- Dissolved: c. 1979 PCR-ML (in Chile) c. 1984 PCR (in exile)
- Preceded by: Espartaco; Vanguardia Revolucionaria Marxista; Unión Comunista del Norte
- Newspaper: El Pueblo; Causa Marxista-Leninista; A.N.C.H.A. A World to Win
- Ideology: Communism; Marxism–Leninism; Maoism (PCR faction); Anti-revisionism; Anti-fascism
- Political position: Far-left
- International affiliation: Revolutionary Internationalist Movement

The Revolutionary Communist Party (Spanish: Partido Comunista Revolucionario / PCR) was a Chilean clandestine communist party of Maoist ideology founded in 1966 from a split in the Communist Party of Chile (PCCH). During the Popular Unity government, it adopted a critical stance towards the government of Salvador Allende. In 1972 the party faced an internal discussion over differences in revolutionary strategy, between those who defended the "people's war" (Maoists) and those who promoted the "mass insurrection" (Marxist–Leninists), causing the party to split into two factions (PCR and PCR-ML, respectively), both disappearing in the early 1980s.

During part of its existence, it was financed by the Chinese Communist Party and by the Labor Party of Albania.

The PCR was led by Jorge Palacios, David Benquis and Luis Bernales.

After the 1973 Chilean coup d'état, a faction of the party would exist in exile in France. In 1980, the RCP of Chile helped found Revolutionary Internationalist Movement (RIM) publishing the theoretical magazine "A World to Win" where the RCP of Chile made its last two participations in the 1981 and 1982 edition. Although the RCP of Chile would largely cease to exist by the time of the first RIM conference in 1984.

After the disappearance of the party in Chile, in 1979 the group "Acción Proletaria" emerged, made up of a small group of former PCR militants with a pro-Albanian tendency, including Miguel Asenjo, Mauricio Aravena and Eduardo Artés. This group would be the base that would form the Chilean Communist Party (Proletariat Action) in 1985.

The PCR dissolved amid internal strife. One section of the party later reconstituted itself as the Communist Organization Recabarren in 1985.

== See also ==
- List of anti-revisionist groups
