= Marxist–Leninist Front =

Small communist group in Sweden

Marxist–Leninist Front (in Swedish: Marxist-Leninistisk Front), was a small communist group in Sweden. MLF was formed through a split in KFML in 1972. The founders of MLF claimed that it had become impossible to conduct revolutionary activities through KFML. MLF published Kommunistisk Teori och Praktik. MLF suffered from internal disputes, and by the winter of 1973 the group was dissolved and merged into KFML(r).
