= Revolutionary Communist Centre of India (Marxist–Leninist) =

The Revolutionary Communist Centre of India (Marxist–Leninist) was a splinter Maoist communist terrorist outfit in India. Later, it split into the Revolutionary Communist Centre of India (Marxist-Leninist-Maoist) party and the Revolutionary Communist Centre of India (Maoist) party.

The Revolutionary Communist Centre of India (Maoist) merged with Maoist Communist Centre of India, which again merged with Communist Party of India (Maoist). The Revolutionary Communist Centre of India (Marxist-Leninist-Maoist) still exists.
