= United Socialists =

United Socialists (in Swedish: Förenade Socialister) was a coalition in Gällivare, Sweden, formed on January 10, 1988 by the Workers Association of Malmberget (MAF), the Solidarity Party and the International Group. In practice it functioned as a front of the latter.

FS contested the 1988 municipal elections (with the ballot name Förenade Socialister-nybyggare). It got 575 votes, and Lasse Karlsson and Kjell Hansson (both from MAF) got elected. FS also contested the County Council elections in Norrbotten, without winning any seat. In Gällivare it got 751 votes for their County Council list. Tomas Junkka of the Solidarity Party headed the list.

The Solidarity Party left FS in the fall of 1988, accusing other constituents of not respecting mutual agreements.

FS published Nybyggaren. The group was disbanded in 1990, but the core of its constituents continued to work with the Workers List
