= Communist Workers' Party of Sweden =

- Founded: 1980
- Dissolved: 1993
- Ideology: Communism; Marxism-Leninism; Anti-revisionism

Communist Workers' Party of Sweden (Swedish: Sveriges Kommunistiska Arbetarparti, SKA), initially called SKP (ml), was a communist party in Sweden, formed in 1980 after a split from the pro-People's Republic of China Communist Party of Sweden (SKP). The party was dissolved in 1993.

== Formation ==
When a leftist minority (approx. 15% of party cadre) was expelled from the Communist Party of Sweden (SKP) in 1980, the expellees founded the Communist Party of Sweden (marxist-leninists) (Sveriges Kommunistiska Parti (marxist-leninisterna)) on November 1–2. The group that formed SKP (ml) was critical of the new leadership of the People's Republic of China, effectively under Deng Xiaoping. Per-Åke Lindblom became the chairman of SKP (ml). SKP (ml) began publishing the magazine Kommunistiska Arbetartidningen in January 1981.

== Name change ==
At a party congress on Penecoastal 1981, the name of SKP (ml) was changed to Communist Workers' Party of Sweden (Sveriges Kommunistiska Arbetarparti, SKA). The party motivated the change by three reasons: 1. The name SKP (ml) was easily confused with SKP, 2. SKA was a shorter and more direct name and 3. SKA was more in line with the name of their publication. The congress also adopted a resolution titled 'Build a front against the Super Powers'.

== Dissolution ==
In 1993, SKA and the pro-Albanian KPS were dissolved in favor of an informal network. Kommunistiska Arbetartidningen and the KPS mouthpiece Kommunisten merged into Nya Arbetartidningen on May 16, 1993. Nya Arbetartidningen was published in paper until 2009 and still exists as an internet magazine.

== Electoral politics ==
SKP (ml)/SKA did not run in elections, but promoted blank votes. It did not find it reasonable to vote for VPK, as VPK had publicly promised never to bring down a Social Democratic government. Moreover it opposed VPKs ties to the Soviet bloc.

== International relations ==
SKP (ml)/SKA never had direct contacts with the Chinese Communist Party nor the Party of Labour of Albania. It had bilateral contacts with other maoist groups such as MLPD (Germany), AKP (m-l) (Norway) and KFML (Denmark). It participated in international conferences organized by MLPD.

SKP (ml)/SKA considered USA and the Soviet Union as equal threats to the revolutionary forces. It supported the Solidarity movement in Poland, the mujahedin struggle in Afghanistan and opposed Vietnamese intervention in Cambodia.

== See also ==
- List of anti-revisionist groups
