= Eduardo Artés =

Chilean politician

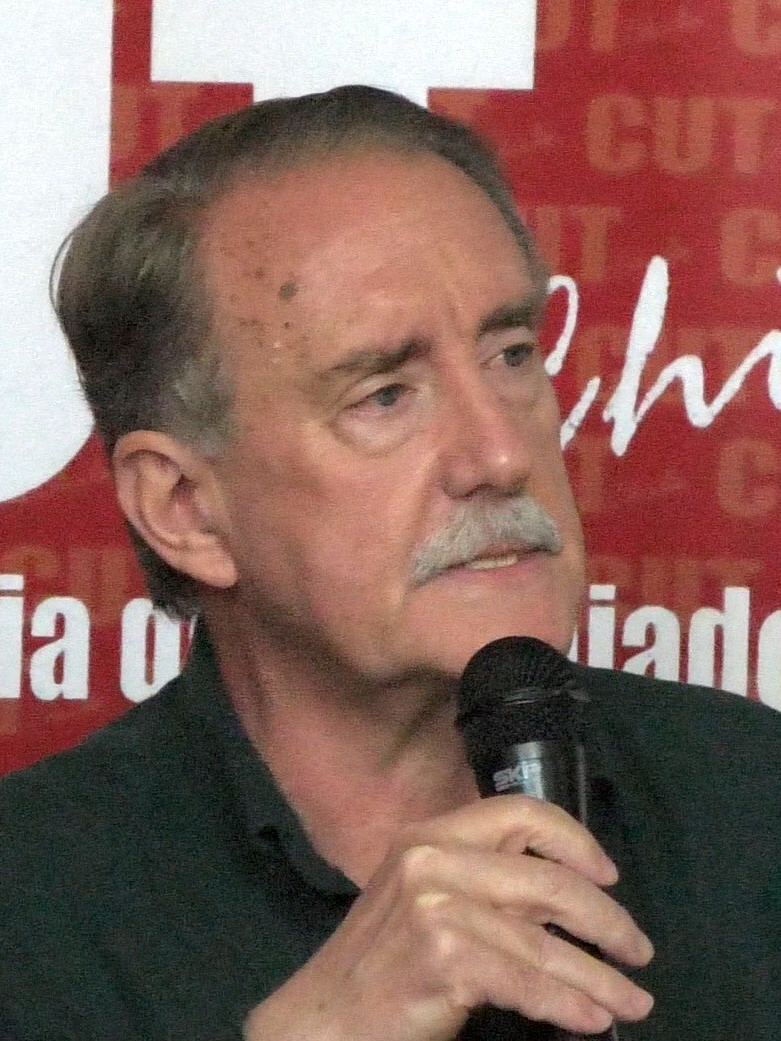
- Artés in 2021

General Secretary of the Chilean Communist Party (Proletarian Action)
- Incumbent
- Assumed office 8 November 1979

President of the Patriotic Union
- In office 14 September 2015 – 3 February 2022

Personal details
- Born: Eduardo Antonio Artés Brichetti; 25 October 1951 (age 74) San Vicente de Tagua Tagua, Chile
- Party: Chilean Communist Party (Proletarian Action)
- Other political affiliations: Revolutionary Communist Party (1966–1979); Patriotic Union (2015–2022)
- Spouse: María Angélica Ibáñez Contreras (m. 1972, divorced)
- Children: 2
- Education: Technical University of the State
- Occupation: Educator

Eduardo Antonio Artés Brichetti (born 25 October 1951) is a Chilean educator and political figure. He is the leader of the Patriotic Union, which nominated him as a candidate for the 2017 and 2021 presidential elections, and in 2025 he ran as independent. Artés seeks the "refoundation of Chile" calling for a workers state.

== Biography ==
Artés was born in the town of El Tambo, in San Vicente de Tagua Tagua. He comes from a peasant family with a leftist tradition, in which there were militants of the Communist Party and also a grandfather, Alfonso Artés Rosselló, with an anarchist tendency. He is the son of Eduardo Artés Urbina, a metal worker, and of Teresa Elena Brichetti Crovetto, who died when Artés was a year old. Through his mother, he is partially of Italian descent.

In 2005 he was a candidate for senator for Santiago with support of the coalition Juntos Podemos Más.

In 2017, Artés claimed that it was necessary to put an end to the current Constitution of Chile, and convene a Constituent Assembly, through which the people would be able to build the foundations of the country, in order to fulfill his government program.

He was married to María Angélica Ibáñez Contreras, with whom he had two children: María Teresa, a teacher, and Patricia Alejandra Elsa, licensed in arts.

== Ideology ==
Eduardo Artés is critical of the traditional Chilean left, calling himself a Marxist-Leninist.

He has publicly manifested his admiration and support to North Korea, claiming that Kim Jong Un has led the country in a proper manner, in which social and political issues have been well handled. He claims that North Korea is a "full popular democracy" and has denied the violations of human rights in North Korea, arguing that "in Chile there are more human rights violations than in North Korea" and that "the first human right is national unity, it is to have all the rights to free healthcare, free housing, assured work, that is to say, quality of life, and that is determined by them."

In July 2013, he traveled to North Korea for two weeks, invited by the Worker's Party. According to those close to him, they took him to see the country and participated in cultural events.

== Controversies ==
In January 2019, during a demonstration by Venezuelans in Chile against the government of Nicolás Maduro, members of the Communist Party (Proletarian Action) came to the scene to dissuade protesting immigrants. Artés was filmed saying "you are in Chile, and you have no right to be here in the national territory and to insult Chileans" and "Go and kiss the shoes of Yankee imperialism (...) you are a gusano, you are scrawny." One of the most controversial phrases occurred during an interaction he had with a Venezuelan woman, to whom he sarcastically said "Damn, you're skinny!" after she affirmed that in Venezuela she was "starving" due to shortages.

== Works ==
- Reformismo: Antesala del fascismo. Artés Brichetti, Eduardo. 1998.
- Elementos para el desarrollo y aplicación en la política de los comunistas. Artés Brichetti, Eduardo. 2004.
