= Movement for the Reorganization of the Communist Party of Greece 1918–1955 =

Movement for the Reorganization of the Communist Party of Greece 1918–1955 Κίνηση για την Ανασύνταξη του ΚΚΕ 1918–1955
- Abbreviation: KA KKE 1918–55
- General Secretary: Tasos Mpallos
- Founded: 1996
- Preceded by: Movement for a United Communist Party of Greece
- Newspaper: Anasintaxi
- Ideology: Communism; Marxism–Leninism; Stalinism; Hoxhaism; Zachariadism; Anti-revisionism
- Political position: Far-left
- International affiliation: CIPOML

Website
- anasintaxi.blogspot.com

Anasintaxi's header has the hammer and sickle symbol in the center, the phrase "Workers of all countries unite" on the top, "in the road of Marxism–Leninism–Stalinism" under the title and it's followed by a small section containing the heads of Karl Marx, Friedrich Engels, Vladimir Lenin and Joseph Stalin on the left and of Nikos Zachariadis on the right.

Anasintaxi is published biweekly. On the first page of this issue the reader can see a photo of J. V. Stalin

The Movement for the Reorganization of the Communist Party of Greece 1918–1955 (Greek: Κίνηση για την Ανασύνταξη του ΚΚΕ 1918–1955), is an anti-revisionist Marxist–Leninist communist party in Greece. It is better known as Anasintaxi (Reorganization).

== History ==
Anasintaxi was established in 1996. It is a Marxist–Leninist organization which struggles for the union of all Greek communists in one Marxist–Leninist–Stalinist party. It occurred from the union of small Marxist–Leninist groups such as Movement for a United Communist Party of Greece and Post-Soviet Epoch mainly consisting of exiled Greek communists from the former Soviet Union and old EAM-ELAS soldiers and officers.

The members of Anasintaxi claim that today's KKE has no relation with the party before its destalinization in the period 1955–1956, and that the new party's leaders betrayed Nikos Zachariadis, the General Secretary of the Communist Party of Greece (KKE) until 1955. In order to make a distinction between the old party and the new party that arose after 1955, they refer to today's KKE as "K"KE or "K"KE('56), adding scare quotes around the first K, which corresponds to the word communist.

In contradiction with other anti-revisionist organisations, Anasintaxi uses regularly the term Stalinism. The movement criticized Ludo Martens as a revisionist and defender of Mikhail Gorbachev, and his book Another View of Stalin as a fundamentally anti-Stalin book.

The organization publishes a biweekly four-page newspaper called Anasintaxi.

Anasintaxi is an active participant in the International Conference of Marxist–Leninist Parties and Organizations (Unity & Struggle).

It has not participated in any elections.

== See also ==
- Politics of Greece
- List of anti-revisionist groups
