= Marxist–Leninist Front of the Peoples of Spain =

Marxist–Leninist Front of the Peoples of Spain Frente Marxista-Leninista de los Pueblos de España
- President: Gregorio Fernandez Lopez
- Founded: 1987
- Headquarters: La Roca del Vallès, (Province of Barcelona)
- Newspaper: Nuestra Lucha
- Ideology: Communism; Marxism–Leninism
- Political position: Far-left

Website
- frentemarxistaleninista.es

Marxist–Leninist Front of the Peoples of Spain (in Spanish: Frente Marxista-Leninista de los Pueblos de España, abbreviated F(M-L)PE) is a Marxist-Leninist party in Spain. The group emerged in 1987, as a split from the Communist Party of the Peoples of Spain. The group was initially known as the Leninist Front of the Communist Party of the Peoples of Spain. The founding president of the group was Francisco Expósito Prieto. It took the name F(M-L)PE in 1992. In April 1993 the Leninist Organization, a group based in Llobregat, merged into F(M-L)PE. In 1995 it was registered with the Spanish Ministry of Interior, with an office in La Roca del Vallès (Barcelona Province). The group published Nuestra Lucha ('Our Struggle'). Leaders of the group have included Lorenzo Ruiz, Gregorio Fernández, Jesús Prades, Antonio de Miguel Quiles and Evangelino Fernández.
