= Communist Party of Sweden (1995) =

Communist Party of Sweden Sveriges kommunistiska parti
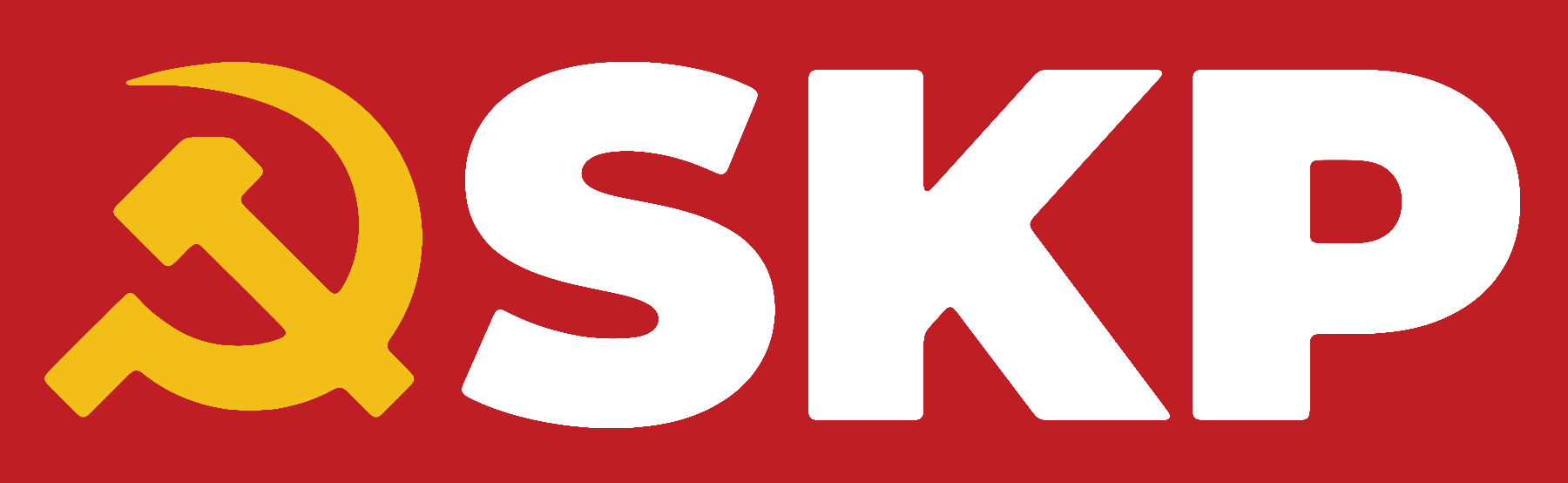
- Abbreviation: SKP
- Chairman: Andreas Sörensen
- Founded: 29 February 1977 (APK); 4 November 1995 (SKP)
- Split from: Left Party – the Communists
- Headquarters: Flyghamnsgatan 1, Skarpnäck, Stockholm
- Newspaper: RiktpunKt
- Youth wing: Communist Youth of Sweden
- Ideology: Communism; Marxism–Leninism; Anti-revisionism
- Political position: Far-left
- European affiliation: European Communist Action (2023–present); INITIATIVE (2013–2023)
- European Parliament group: Non-Inscrits
- International affiliation: IMCWP
- Colours: Red
- Riksdag: 0 / 349
- European Parliament: 0 / 21
- County councils: 0 / 1,597
- Municipal councils: 0 / 12,780

Website
- skp.se

The Communist Party of Sweden (Swedish: Sveriges kommunistiska parti, SKP) is a Marxist–Leninist party in Sweden and continuation of Workers' Party Communists (Swedish: Arbetarpartiet kommunisterna, APK).

The SKP is a founding member of the European Communist Action (ECA), as well as a former member of the European Communist Initiative (ECI), from its founding in 2013 until it was dissolved in 2023. The party has also been participating in the International Meetings of Communist and Workers' Parties (IMCWPs).

== History ==
The Flamman group, an orthodox pro-Soviet section within Left Party Communists (Vänsterpartiet Kommunisterna), emerged as an internal fraction when C.-H. Hermansson took over as party leader and distanced the party from Moscow. The group was centered on the party newspaper Norrskensflamman ('The Flame of the Aurora Borealis'; usually just called Flamman), the regional party publication in Norrbotten County. The fraction worked as a parallel party centre, and relations between it and the party leadership soured.

At the party congress in 1975, when Hermansson stepped down as party leader, the Flamman group launched Rolf Hagel as its candidate for the party leadership. Hagel was defeated by Lars Werner with 162 votes against 74. In the same year the Flamman-sympathizers were expelled from Kommunistisk Ungdom (Communist Youth), the youth league of the party.

The group broke away in 1977, and formed Arbetarpartiet Kommunisterna ('Workers Party Communists', abbreviated APK). A founding congress took place in the Swedish Riksdag. A large number of foreign delegates attended the congress, indicating that APK had strong moral support from CPSU and the orthodox sector of the World Communist Movement. Two MPs (and party central committee members), Rolf Hagel and Alf Löwenborg, led the split. Hagel was elected party president. Norrskensflamman became the central party organ.

Entire VPK party units joined APK in many places, including Malmö, Gothenburg and Mälardalen. The foremost stronghold of the new party was Norrbotten County. In total, up to 25% of the entire VPK party membership (other sources claim between 10% and 15%) joined APK. To a large extent it was the trade union cadres of VPK who joined APK. Shortly thereafter, a large section of the KU district in Gävleborg County joined APK.

Sveriges Kommunistiska Ungdomsförbund ('Communist Youth of Sweden', abbreviated SKU) was created as the youth wing of the party. A student wing, Marxistiska Studenter ('Marxist Students'), was founded although it never attained any importance.

APK failed to make any electoral breakthrough, and gradually the party declined. The fall of the Soviet Union had a very negative impact on the party; many members left, either to leave politics completely or to rejoin the Left Party. SKU broke away in 1990, and had a short-lived period as an independent communist youth organization.

In 1995, APK was declared financially bankrupt by state authorities, the first political party in Sweden to suffer that fate.

Directly after the bankruptcy of APK, the core around Hagel regrouped and reconstituted their party as Sveriges Kommunistiska Parti (Communist Party of Sweden). In 2000 SKU was reorganized as the party youth wing.

In 2026, SKP recorded its best election result since the fall of the Soviet Union, receiving 2,167 votes, almost doubling their votes from 2022.

Factions within the Swedish left during the last century.

== Ideology ==
The SKP is Marxist-Leninist and anti-revisionist, it supported the Soviet government under Joseph Stalin and considers the leadership after him to be revisionist. It is a staunch supporter of proletarian internationalism and as such supports the proletarian revolutions globally as a single class struggle. It supports a revolutionary overthrow of capitalism and the establishment of the dictatorship of the proletariat led by a communist party organized according to the principles of democratic centralism. The party is strongly supportive of the LGBTQ people, advocating for better rights and increased protections. It is in favor of immigration, expressing solidarity with them. The party supports women's liberation, arguing that capitalism oppresses women as such they consider women's liberation core to worker's liberation.

== Election results ==
=== Riksdag ===
Year	Votes	%	Seats	+/–	Government
1998	1,868	0.03 (#15)	0 / 349	New	No seats
2002	1,182	0.02 (#17)	0 / 349	0	No seats
2006	438	0.01 (#20)	0 / 349	0	No seats
2010	375	0.01 (#20)	0 / 349	0	No seats
2014	558	0.01 (#21)	0 / 349	0	No seats
2018	702	0.01 (#20)	0 / 349	0	No seats
2022	1,181	0.02 (#21)	0 / 349	0	No seats
2026	2,167	0.03 (#16)	0 / 349	0	No seats

=== European Parliament ===
Election	List leader	Votes	%	Seats	+/–	EP Group
2019	Lars Lundberg	974	0.02 (#18)	0 / 20	New	–
2024	Martin Tairi	1,629	0.04 (#18)	0 / 20	0	–

The party was represented in the municipal council of Gällivare until April 2013, when their sole representative was expelled from the party after he suggested that a vote for the SKP in the 2014 Swedish general election constituted a wasted vote.

== See also ==
- Communist Party of Sweden (disambiguation)
