= Unified Communist Party of Italy =

Italian political party

PCUd'I poster - in the style of a wanted poster, illustrating Soviet leader Leonid Brezhnev. The poster reads "Wanted Leonid Brezhnev *For the kidnapping of Aldo Moro *for the assassination of Casalegno *for the aggressions against Czechoslovakia, Angola, Somalia, etc. Brezhnev leads, through KGB, the strategy of terror to impose the 'emergency government' under control of pro-Soviet forces, to spread chaos and to prepare aggression against Italy and Europe."

Unified Communist Party of Italy (in Italian: Partito Comunista Unificato d'Italia, PCUd'I) was a political party in Italy. The party upheld the Three Worlds Theory and retained contacts with the Chinese Communist Party following the death of Mao Zedong. The party vehemently opposed the Soviet Union and the Italian Communist Party. It was led by Osvaldo Pesce. The party published the journal Linea proletaria (Proletarian Line).

== History ==
=== Organization of Marxist–Leninist Communists of Italy ===
The group emerged from the Organization of Marxist–Leninist Communists of Italy (Italian: Organizzazione dei comunisti (marxisti-leninisti) d'Italia), which was formed in 1970 after a split in the Communist Party of Italy (Marxist–Leninist) (PCd'I (m-l)) following the expulsion of the PCd'I (m-l) party hierarchy second-in-command Osvaldo Pesce. Osvaldo Pesce was the general secretary of the group. The organization began issuing the journal Linea proletaria ('Proletarian Line'). Whilst the main Italian fraternal party of the Chinese Communist Party was the Fosco Dinucci-led PCd'I (m-l), the CCP maintained relations with the Organization of Marxist–Leninist Communists of Italy as well.

=== Shifts in China ===
The Pesce group praised the new Chinese leadership following the death of Mao Zedong and the purge of the Gang of Four, earning Pesce an invitation to be received by Ji Dengkui in Beijing on behalf the Politburo of the Chinese Communist Party in February 1977.

=== Unity congress ===
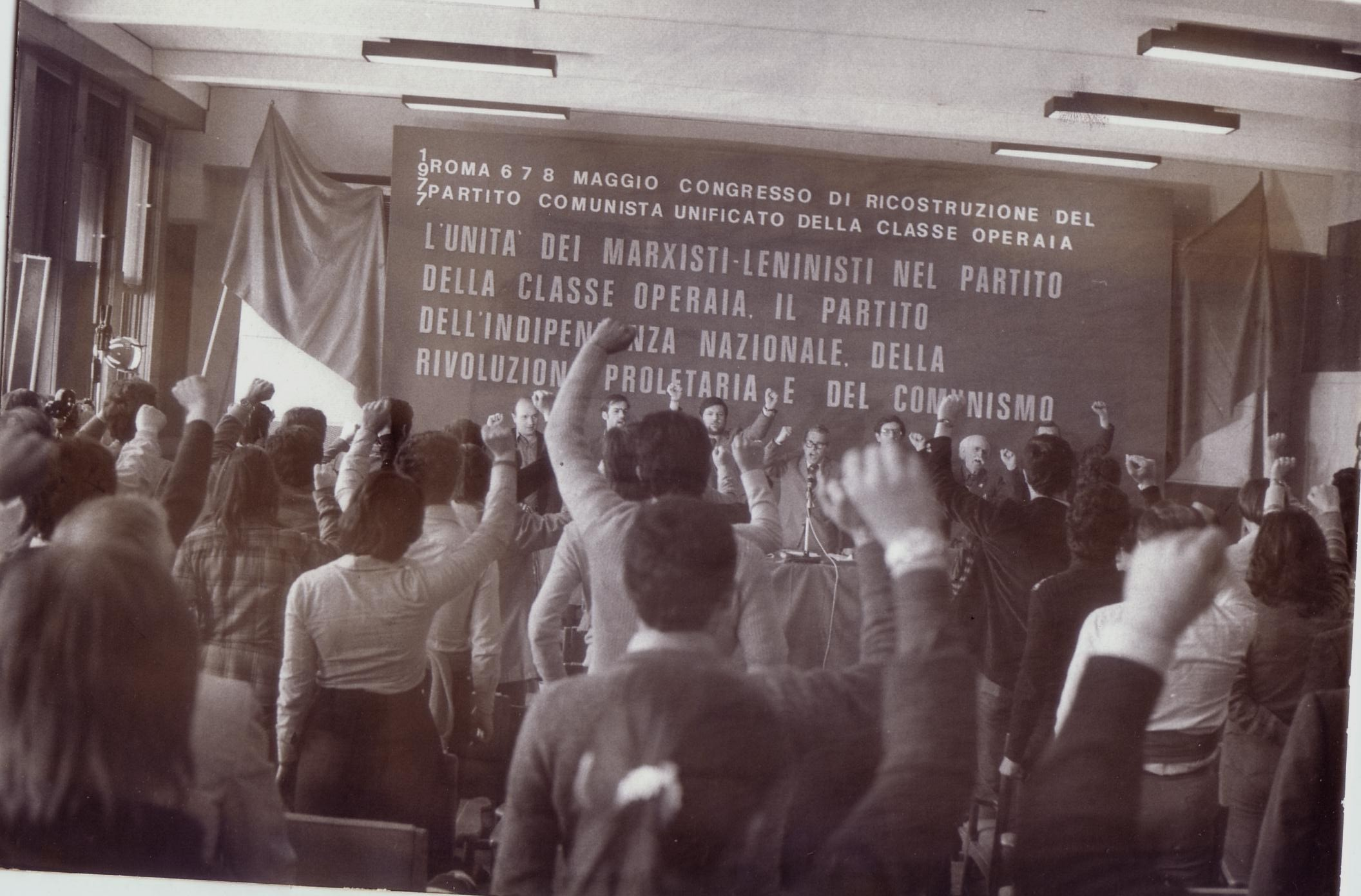
Founding congress of PCUd'I, May 1977

At a congress held in Rome between 6 and 8 May 1977, the Organization of Marxist–Leninist Communists of Italy merged with smaller groups (according to Peking Review, they were 'Struggle of Long Duration, Consciousness of the Workers and Proletarian Ideology') into the Unified Communist Party of Italy (PCUd'I). During the founding congress, Pesce attacked the Soviet Union and the Italian Communist Party, referring to Soviet leader Leonid Brezhnev as the 'new Hitler' and called Enrico Berlinguer and Luciano Lama 'the greatest reactionaries in Italy'. Pesce retained the post of general secretary of the PCUd'I. Other Central Committee members included Burgani, Losurdo and Nappini.

=== Later developments ===
PCUd'I held its third party congress in Florence in July 1978, which reaffirmed the adherence of the party to Marxism-Leninism Mao Zedong Thought.

PCUd'I joined the Communist Coordination.
