= Communist Party of Switzerland/Marxist–Leninists =

Communist Party of Switzerland/Marxist–Leninists (German: Kommunistische Partei der Schweiz/Marxisten-Leninisten, French: Parti Communiste Suisse/Marxistes-Léninistes, Italian: Partito Comunista della Svizzera/Marxista-Leninista, KPS/ML) was a Maoist political party in Switzerland. It was founded in 1969 by now exiled intellectual Nils Andersson. Its forerunner, the Lenin Centre, had been founded in Lausanne in 1964.

== History ==
The first Maoist party, which took the name of the old Communist Party of Switzerland (CPS), originated in Switzerland in 1963 but later disintegrated. Some of its former members founded a successor organization, the Centre Lénine, in 1964 in Lausanne. The Organization of Communists of Switzerland / Marxist–Leninist developed from the Centre in 1967. In 1972 it became the KPS / ML.

Membership of the cadre party KPS / ML was low, never exceeding 80 members. The party was organized into cells. For years, The Politburo consisted of two non-academics. Sympathizers were recorded in mass organizations (for women, students, Third World solidarity, etc.). Many of these came from the Swiss or '68 student movement from the early 1970s. Both the members of the cadre party and sympathizers were expected to make a large time commitment (newspaper sales before factory gates, ideological training) as well as meeting the financial expenses involved in party work.

== Workers ==
Cells of the party existed amongst the workers in several industries, notably in the Zürich machine industry, in construction, in the hospital sector, and in the Ticino industry. In German-speaking Switzerland, new students of École Polytechnique provided a flow of members, particularly from agronomy and architecture.

The Communist Party of Switzerland / Marxist-Leninists was the only Maoist grouping in Switzerland, and as such received official recognition of the CCP and in the mid-seventies of the Albanian Party of Labour. Articles from the monthly party journal October, recorded greetings of the party leader, occasionally cited Rundschau in Beijing and reported news of party delegations invited to China

== 1970 conflict ==
In 1970, KPS / ML attempted to stir opposition and conflict within other left-wing domestic political parties. This was motivated by its adherence to the Chinese theory of the three worlds. Because the main enemy in its worldview were the two superpowers, with a clear emphasis on the Russian social-imperialism, the KPS / ML represented positions that can be consistently characterized as bourgeois-democratic: unity with its own bourgeoisie in defense of the national independence of the country, including military defense; support of trade unions in the struggle for economic betterment positions and basic democratic rights; advocacy of nuclear power as a factor of independence and as technological progress; and criticism of the Party of Labour as an agency of Soviet interests—all this formally in continuation of the objective of realizing "Red Switzerland" and striving for the "dictatorship of the proletariat".

From the mid-1970s, the KPS / ML considered the Soviet Union as the main enemy. Like many other K-groups supported them since the beginning of the attacks of Vietnam against Cambodia the "Democratic Kampuchea" with Pol Pot, which was still recognized by the United Nations as the legitimate government of Cambodia. In 1987, the party dissolved into the Liberal-Socialist Party on (FSP), which existed until 1989.

== See also ==
- List of anti-revisionist groups

== Bibliography ==
- Zimmermann, Angela (2006). Maoisten in der Schweiz. Das lange rote Jahrzehnt der KPS/ML im Kontext der schweizerischen Linken 1972–1987.
