= Municipal Left (Mariestad) =

Municipal Left (Swedish: Kommunal Vänster, "KV") was a political formation in Mariestad, Sweden. KV was formed in 1986, when the Mariestad branch of the Communist Party of Sweden broke away following the 5th congress of the party. The Mariestad branch had reacted to the decision of the congress to lift the categorically refusal of the party towards accepting government funding.

KV contested the 1988 municipal elections. It won two seats.
