= Chilean Communist Party (Proletarian Action) =

Political party in Chile

Chilean Communist Party (Proletarian Action) Partido Comunista Chileno (Acción Proletaria)
- General Secretary: Eduardo Artés
- Founded: November 8, 1979
- Split from: PCR
- Headquarters: Av. Matta 692; Santiago
- Newspaper: Remolino Popular
- Ideology: Communism; Marxism–Leninism; Stalinism Hoxhaism; Socialist patriotism; Anti-revisionism
- Political position: Far-left
- National affiliation: UPA (2015-2022)
- International affiliation: ICOR; World Anti-Imperialist Platform
- Colours: Red, Gold
- Slogan: "To recast Chile!" (¡A refundar Chile!)
- Chamber of Deputies: 0 / 120
- Senate: 0 / 38
- Local government: 0 / 345

Party flag

Website
- http://www.accionproletaria.com/

Chilean Communist Party (Proletarian Action) (Spanish: Partido Comunista Chileno (Acción Proletaria), PC(AP)) is an anti-revisionist Marxist–Leninist communist party in Chile, founded in 1979 and originating from the pro-Albanian tradition of the Revolutionary Communist Party. It has presented independent candidates on legislative elections. The General Secretary of PC(AP) is Eduardo Artés.

PC(AP) was a member of the International Conference of Marxist–Leninist Parties and Organizations (Unity & Struggle) (ICMLPO) and is currently a member of the International Coordination of Revolutionary Parties and Organizations (ICOR), and the World Anti-Imperialist Platform (WAP)

== History ==
The header of Acción Proletaria. The head of Karl Marx, Friedrich Engels, Vladimir Lenin and Joseph Stalin are visible next to the hammer and sickle.

The Chilean Communist Party (Proletarian Action) was founded on November 8, 1979, through a split from the now defunct Revolutionary Communist Party. In 1984 the party joined "Coordinadora de Organizaciones Revolucionarias".

In the 90s-2000s, the party has been member of Movimiento Izquierda Democrática Allendista, Unidos Venceremos and Juntos Podemos, leaving the latter after Guillermo Teillier (President of the Communist Party of Chile, a political party member of Juntos Podemos) called to support Concertación candidate Michelle Bachelet in the 2006 presidential elections. While in Juntos Podemos, the party proposed their general secretary, Eduardo Artés, as an independent senate candidate for West Santiago (being a non-registered party), earning 50,000 votes, failing to be elected.

In 2009 the party supported Artés as a candidate for the 2009 presidential election, but due to their non-registered nature, they were unable to register him in the electoral service. Since 2009 the party has called for spoiling votes and more recently, abstention, in order to illegitimate "Neo-liberal" governments and its electoral system.

== Philosophy ==
The party, according to its statutes, strictly subscribes to the Marxist-Leninist theory, vindicating the works of Marx, Engels, Lenin and Stalin, being against the revision of the bases of Marxism-Leninism (anti-revisionism). This means that it declares itself in favor of the popular struggles of the workers, in pursuit of the "democratic and popular revolution" towards socialism and communism as the final stage; which must be achieved by all forms of struggle within the reach of the working class and the exploited peoples, from the simplest such as the struggles for immediate reforms, understood as a means for the organization and revolutionary consciousness-raising of the masses, to the most complex and superior such as the armed popular insurrection. It is organized according to democratic centralism, in order to achieve these objectives, and aims to become the vanguard detachment of the Chilean working class.

== Publications ==
The party publishes an annual magazine called Acción Proletaria magazine and a monthly newspaper, Remolino Popular.

== See also ==
- List of anti-revisionist groups
