= Proletarian Party of East Bengal =

Political party in Bangladesh

Proletarian Party of East Bengal পূর্ব বাংলার সর্বহারা পার্টি
- Abbreviation: PBSP
- Chairman: Anwar Kabir
- Founder: Siraj Sikder
- Founded: 3 June 1971; 55 years ago
- Preceded by: Workers Movement of East Bengal (1968-71)
- Newspaper: Sphulinga (Spark)
- Ideology: Communism; Marxism–Leninism–Maoism
- Political position: Far-left
- Regional affiliation: CCOMPOSA
- International affiliation: RIM (defunct)
- Colours: Red
- Slogan: Workers of the world, unite!
- Anthem: "The Internationale"

Party flag
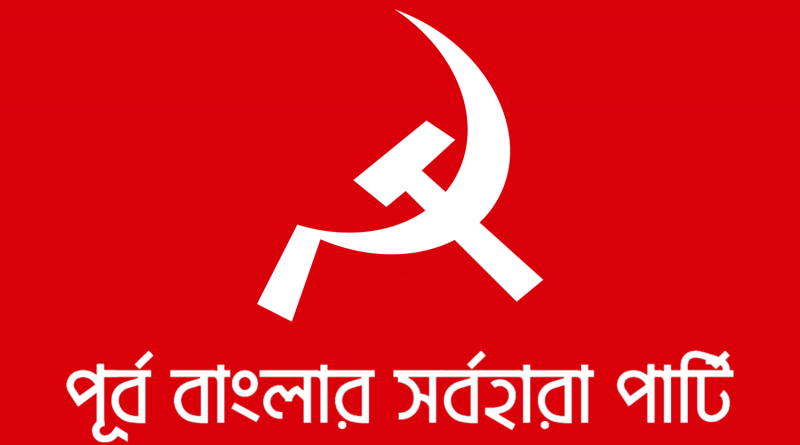

Website
- pbsp.cc

The Proletarian Party of East Bengal (Bengali: পূর্ব বাংলার সর্বহারা পার্টি), also known as Purba Banglar Sarbahara Party, commonly referred to as Sarbahara, and abbreviated as PBSP, is a Marxist–Leninist–Maoist communist party in Bangladesh, which aims to overthrow the Bangladeshi state and complete the new democratic revolution through protracted people's war. It was formed by Siraj Sikder on 3 June 1971 in Barisal District amidst the Bangladesh Liberation War.

The party started its activities in 1968 as the Workers Movement of East Bengal. It played a major role in the independence struggle of the country. From the late 1960s to the early 70s, it engaged in armed struggle against the West Pakistani regime in order to establish a Democratic People's Republic of East Bengal. After the proclamation of Bangladeshi independence led by the Mujib–Awami government, the party launched a war against the newly established Bangladeshi state. However, heavy state repression, the killing of its chairman, Siraj Sikder, and internal divisions led to the party's decline. Despite this, it remains active in several regions of the country and continues to carry out attacks against state police, landowners and extorters.

According to the constitution of the party, the highest body is the Party Congress, which is to be held every five years, but due to it being an underground operation and heavy repression from state forces, the time period has never been maintained. Until now, the Party Congress has been held five times, the first being in 1972 and the last in 2024. Since 1977, Anwar Kabir has been serving as the General Secretary of the party. In the 5th Party Congress, Anwar Kabir was elected as the Chairman of the party. In the early 2000s, two groups broke out of the party and formed the Proletarian Party of East Bengal (Maoist Bolshevik Reorganisation Movement) and the Proletarian Party of East Bengal (Maoist Unity Group).

== History ==
=== 1967–1970: Origins ===
The group emerged from the pro-China faction of the communist movement in what was then East Pakistan. In 1967, Siraj Sikder had established the Mao Tse Tung Thought Research Centre in Dhaka. The centre was subjected to physical attacks by Jamaat-e-Islami cadres on several occasions. On 8 January 1968, the group established the 'Purba Banglar Sramik Andalon' (Workers Movement of East Bengal). The founding conference, which was completed in a single day, took place at the residence of a jute mill worker in Dhaka. The conference was attended by 45 to 50 followers of the centre.

The stance of this faction was distinctly different from other pro-Chinese groups in East Pakistan at the time. Sikdar's faction viewed Pakistan as a colonial power and advocated for national liberation for East Bengal, aiming to establish a Democratic Republic of East Bengal. This position was in stark contrast to the official foreign policy of the People’s Republic of China (PRC), which generally sided with Pakistan against India. This stance was also more radical than that of the mainstream Bengali nationalist movement. Sheikh Mujibur Rahman, a prominent figure in the movement, denounced the Sikdar faction as 'pro-Chinese provocateurs'.

The group also opposed American imperialism, Soviet social imperialism, Indian expansionism, and feudalism.

In mid-1968, the movement initiated covert operations. Their first action involved capturing a cyclostyle printing machine, which they used to print the theoretical organ of the movement, 'Lal Jhanda' (Red Flag). On 8 January 1970, the group hoisted the flag of East Bengal (now the national flag of Bangladesh) at Dhaka, Munshigonj, and Mymensingh. On Karl Marx's birthday, 6 May 1970, the group launched a bomb attack on the Pakistan Council office in Dhaka. In October of the same year, the group carried out bomb attacks on several buildings throughout East Pakistan, including the American Information Centre.

=== 1971: Liberation War ===
At the onset of the Liberation War in 1971, the Sikder faction was actively involved in establishing national resistance cells. On 30 April, they formed their own paramilitary force, known as the 'Purba Banglar Sashastra Deshapremik Bahini' (Armed Patriotic Force of East Bengal). This force initiated an armed struggle against the Pakistani army. This faction was one of the many pro-China groups that actively participated in the liberation war. During this period, the official stance of the PRC was that East Bengal was part of Pakistan, and they viewed Indian expansionism as the primary threat to the region. Despite this, the group regarded the mainstream nationalist movement as class enemies.

The Purba Bangla Sarbahara Party (PBSP) was officially established as a political party on 3 June 1971 during a meeting held in the Barisal district.

=== 1972–1974: Post-independence ===
Following the independence of Bangladesh, PBSP emerged as a significant contender against the newly formed Awami League government, which it perceived as puppets of India. The party’s inaugural congress was convened on 14 January 1972, during which Sikder was elected as the Chairman.

In April 1973, the 'Purba Banglar Jatiya Mukti Front' was established as a coalition of 11 groups, with Sikder assuming the role of president of the front. Upon its formation, the party launched an armed campaign against the state of Bangladesh. The party had substantial support within university circles and maintained a strong presence despite being an underground movement. It regularly published its Central Committee’s publications and had an effective propaganda operation. Among its publications were 'Lal Jhanda' and Sangbad Bulletin.

=== 1975: Death of Sikder ===
In December 1974, Sikder was apprehended in Halishahar, Chittagong by the state intelligence service. He was killed on the night of 2 January 1975 near the Savar Thana Bus Stand (Ganda) while being transported from Dhaka airport to a paramilitary camp in Savar.

Following Sikder's death, the party divided into two factions. These factions subsequently split even further. The major faction was led by Siraj Sikder's second in command, Md. Hamidul Hoque, who assumed leadership of the party. A splinter group diverged from Maoism and embraced the political ideology of the Albanian Communists. This group eventually rebranded itself as the Communist Party of Bangladesh.

=== 1976–present: Party today ===
The group currently viewed as the successor to the original PBSP is commonly known as the PBSP Central Committee, PBSP(CC). This party continues to operate underground and advocates for an armed revolution. Under the leadership of Anwarul Kabir, also known as Abdur Rouf, the party is active in several districts, including the Sirajganj, Bogra, Pabna, Rajshahi, and Khulna. The party is affiliated with the Revolutionary Internationalist Movement and CCOMPOSA.

In 2001, a faction separated from the PBSP(CC) and established a new entity known as the Purba Banglar Sarbahara Party (Maoist Bolshevik Reorganisation Movement).

In May 2013, six members of the PBSP were apprehended, and they were found in possession of pipe guns and homemade rifles.

The party's 5th Congress was held in 2024. Anwar Kabir was elected as the Party's Chairman. The party participated in the July Revolution, which successfully forced Sheikh Hasina and her cabinet to step down from power.

== See also ==
- CCOMPOSA
- 1972–75 Bangladeshi insurgency
- Maoist insurgency in Bangladesh
