= Municipal Left (Laxå) =

Municipal Left (in Swedish: Kommunal Vänster) was a local political formation in Laxå, Sweden. KV was founded in 1986, as a cooperation between the Left Party - Communists (VPK) and Solidarity Party. It contested the 1988 municipal elections as "VPK/Kommunal Vänster". Later it took part in elections just as Kommunal Vänster. On the lists were Left Party (as VPK had changed name) and independents (as the Solidarity Party branch had been dissolved).

Later KV was amalgamated into the Left Party.

KV published Hammar'n.
