= Communist Party of Sweden (1967) =

Communist League Marxists–Leninists
- Abbreviation: KFML (1967-1973); SKP (1973-1986)
- Founded: 1967
- Dissolved: 1986
- Split from: Left Party – the Communists
- Succeeded by: Solidaritetspartiet
- Newspaper: Gnistan
- Youth wing: Röd ungdom
- Ideology: Communism; Marxism–Leninism; Maoism; Anti-revisionism
- Political position: Far-left

Kommunistiska Förbundet Marxist-Leninisterna (Swedish: [kɔmɵˈnɪ̌sːtɪska fœrˈbɵ̌nːdɛt markˈsɪ̂sːtlɛnɪˌnɪstɛɳa]; KFML; English: Communist League Marxists-Leninists) was formed at the 1967 party congress of VPK, when a pro-Chinese group left the party.

== Party history ==
=== 1967–1980 ===
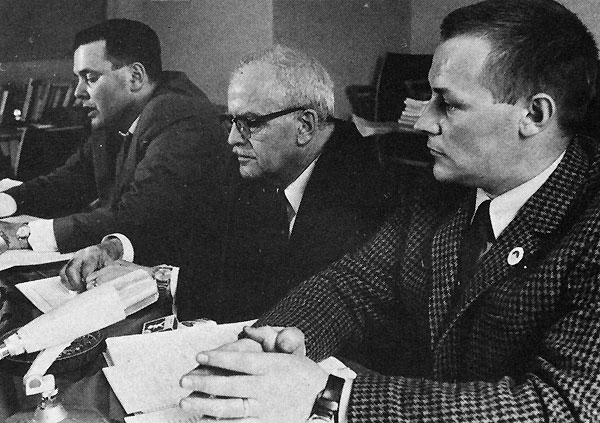
KFML press conference in Malmö, 1967

KFML was oriented towards the People's Republic of China and Marxism–Leninism as interpreted by Mao Zedong, commonly known as Maoism. KFML was the first of the many New Left-groups that surged in Sweden during the 1960s and 1970s. KFML had a very important and leading role in the mass solidarity work with the Vietnamese people.

In 1970, a left wing faction based in Gothenburg broke away and formed KFML(r).

In 1973, KFML took the name Sveriges Kommunistiska Parti (Communist Party of Sweden), the old party name of VPK. SKP held its first party congress on 4–7 January 1973. The second party congress was held in Gustavsberg on 15–19 April 1976.

In 1980, SKP suffered another split, when a group of critics were expelled on the issue of China. The expelled formed a new party, Sveriges Kommunistiska Parti (Marxist-Leninisterna).

=== 1980s ===
The 1980s meant crisis for SKP. They were divided on the issue of the new leadership in China, effectively under Deng Xiaoping. Vietnam, which had meant so much in the solidarity work of KFML/SKP, and Cambodia, "their" ally, had become involved in the Cambodian-Vietnamese War, fighting against each other. And SKP, who had succeeded in getting famous in Swedish politics, had not been able to expand and get more than fractions of a percent in votes. From 1982 and onwards, they supported the Swedish Social Democratic Party in the national elections. Many members, both leaders and base militants left the movement. The party became seriously ideologically disoriented.

The 4th congress of the party was held on 16–17 June 1984. Roland Pettersson was elected chairman.

In the 1985 general election, the party won representation in the municipal councils in Gällivare (1 seat), Mariestad (2 seats), Vallentuna (1 seat), Laxå, Vadstena and Sigtuna (2 seats).

At the 5th congress of the party (31 October – 2 November 1986) SKP changed its name to Solidaritetspartiet (The Solidarity Party), and adopted a non-communist programme. The new name was registered on 28 November. It is probable that the name was inspired by the Polish Solidarity movement under Lech Wałęsa, as the party supported their struggle. There was a small section who wanted to keep the old name. There were also other, alternative proposals, such as Demokratiska Socialister (the runner-up proposal), Sveriges Socialistiska Vänsterparti and Sveriges Revolutionära Socialister. The name of the party publication was changed to Solidaritets-Gnistan and became a triweekly. The Mariestad branch of the party, which had municipal representation, broke with the and formed Municipal Left. The Mariestad branch had objected to the decision by the congress to remove the ban on local organizations to receive government financing.

Splits within the Swedish left during the last century.

The 5th congress elected the following central committee:

- Jan-Olof Norell (chairman)
- Inga Allard
- Björn Fredriksson
- Tomas Jonsson
- Tomas Junkka
- Göran Lundin
- Lars-Åke Lönn
- Lisa Norman
- Lars Ströman
- Pia Ryberg
- Sanna Vestin
- Göran Wicksell

In the 1988 general election, the party contested the municipal elections in Sigtuna and Vallentuna. In Laxå party took part in the elections as Municipal Left (Kommunal Vänster), on the list "VPK/Kommunal Vänster" a cooperation between the party and VPK. In Katrineholm, the party contested on the list of "VPK-Kommunal Vänster", together with VPK, SP and independents. In Hammarö it contested on the list of "Vänsterpartiet Kommunisterna/Kommunal Vänster". In Gällivare the party contested on the lists of United Socialists.

In Vallentuna the vore-share increased from 414 to 596 (4.7%). The party got two seats, and Norell and Wicksell became municipal councillors. In Sigtuna the seat of the party was retained, and the vote-share increased from 300 to 350. The party lost its municipal representation in Gällivare. VPK/Kommunal Vänster won five seats in Laxå. In Hammarö VPK/Kommunal Vänster won three seats. VPK-Kommunal Vänster failed to win any seat in Katrineholm.

=== Decline to obscurity ===
Ahead of the party congress on 4–5 November 1989, the central committee had proposed that the party be disbanded. By this time the party had only a handful of functioning local units, and there was a strong trend towards dissolving the national organization and let the local units continue to function on the municipal left in cooperation with other forces. The congress did however not approve that suggestion. The congress also decided that Solidaritets-Gnistan would cease to function as an external publication. The congress elected the following central committee:

- Jan-Olof Norell (chairman)
- Inga Allard
- Christin Almgren
- Leif Franzén
- Björn Fredriksson
- Tomas Jonsson
- Pia Ryberg
- Lars Ströman
- Anna-Maria Valladolid
- Göran Wicksell
- Sanna Vestin

In the new central committee, 4 out of 11 members came from Vallentuna. The congress also decided that another congress would convene in the summer of 1990 to decide the future of the party.

The last issue of Solidaritets-Gnistan was published on 13 December 1989.

By 1990, the party ceased to function as a nationwide party. The party transformed into an entirely municipal party in Vallentuna. Solidaritetspartiet ran in the municipal elections in Vallentuna until 1994, when they got 6% and 3 seats. They did not run in the 1998 elections.

== Youth wing ==
Initially Clarté functioned as the youth and students wing of the party. Later Röd Ungdom (Red Youth, RU) was founded as the youth league of SKP. It published a magazine called Rödluvan (Little Red Ridinghood).

RU held its fourth congress on 24–25 April 1982. Notably the congress opposed the party line of voting in favour of the Social Democrats in the upcoming elections. Instead the youth wing appealed for blank voting. A resolution adopted by the congress read "...none of the parliamentary parties will fix the future of the Swedish youth. The future is decided by the organisation and struggle of the youth". A three-member delegation of the SKP party leadership was present at the congress, but were unable to convince RU to support the party line.

RU held a fifth, extraordinary, congress in 1983. By that time the youth wing was in bad shape. Representatives from 15 local units took part in the congress. The congress approved the merger of MLK into RU.

At the time of the 1988 elections youth group was formed in Vallentuna, Solidarity Party Youth League (SPUF).

== See also ==
- Marxist–Leninist Front
- List of anti-revisionist groups
