= Revolutionary Communist Centre of India (Marxist–Leninist–Maoist) =

Revolutionary Communist Centre of India (Marxist–Leninist–Maoist) was a splinter Maoist communist outfit in India. It is formed after the split of Revolutionary Communist Centre of India (Marxist-Leninist) into the Revolutionary Communist Centre of India (Marxist–Leninist–Maoist) party and the Revolutionary Communist Centre of India (Maoist) party.

The other faction Revolutionary Communist Centre of India (Maoist) merge with Maoist Communist Centre of India, which again merge with Communist Party of India (Maoist).

== See also ==
- List of Naxalite and Maoist groups in India
