= Revolutionary Internationalist Movement =

International Maoist organization

- Abbreviation: RIM
- Founded: March 1984; 42 years ago
- Ideology: Communism; Marxism–Leninism–Maoism; Anti-revisionism; Revolutionary socialism
- Political position: Far-left

The Revolutionary Internationalist Movement (RIM) was an international communist organization founded in France in March 1984 by 17 various Maoist organizations around the world. It sought to "struggle for the formation of a Communist International of a new type, based on Marxism–Leninism–Maoism". The RIM appears to be defunct as are many of the founding organizations. The Revolutionary Communist Party, USA was the most powerful force within the RIM.

== Ideology ==
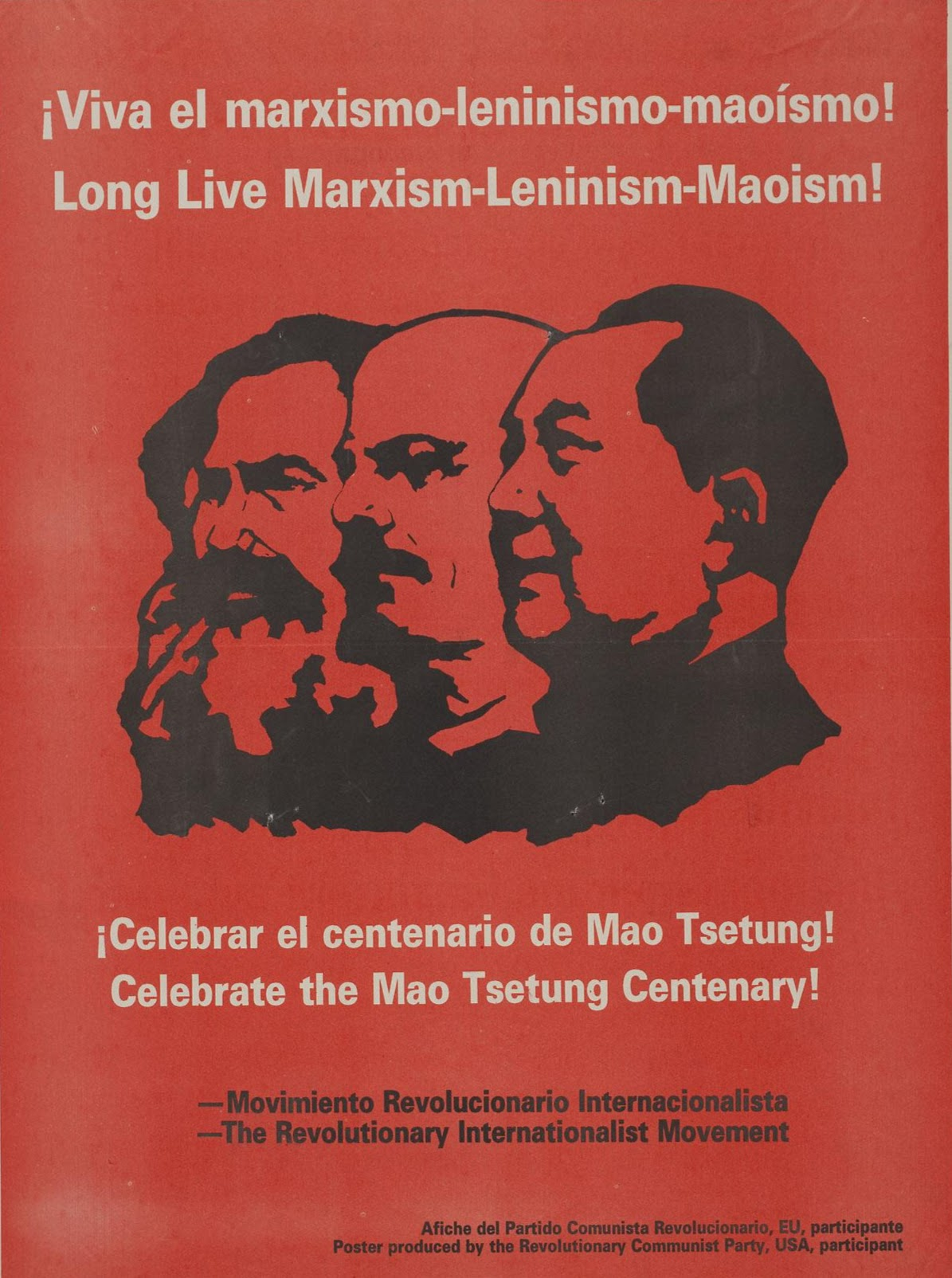
1990 RIM poster showing Marx, Lenin, and Mao

From 1993 onwards the RIM believed that the experience gained from the "People's War" in Peru enabled the International Communist Movement "to further deepen [their] grasp of the proletarian ideology and on that basis take a far-reaching step, the recognition of Marxism–Leninism–Maoism as the new, third and higher stage of Marxism". This formulation caused a split in the Maoist movement, with the continued adherents of Mao Zedong Thought leaving RIM and congregating around the International Conference of Marxist–Leninist Parties and Organizations.

== Members ==
Country	English name	Native name	Abbreviation
Afghanistan	Communist (Maoist) Party of Afghanistan	حزب كمونيست (مائوئيست) افغانستان	C(M)PA
Bangladesh	Proletarian Party of East Bengal	পূর্ব বাংলার সর্বহারা পার্টি	PBSP
Chile	Revolutionary Communist Party	Partido Comunista Revolucionario	PCR
Colombia	Revolutionary Communist Group of Colombia	Grupo Comunista Revolucionario de Colombia	RCGC
Colombia	Communist Party of Colombia (Marxist–Leninist), Mao Tsetung Regional Committee	Partido Comunista de Colombia (marxista-leninista), Comité Regional Mao Tsetung	CPC(ML)MTRC
Dominican Republic	Revolutionary Communist Union	Unión Comunista Revolucionaria	RCU
Haiti	Haitian Revolutionary Internationalist Group	Gwoup Entènasyonalis Revolisyonè Ayisyen	GRIA
India	Central Reorganisation Committee, Communist Party of India (Marxist–Leninist)	केंद्रीय पुनर्गठन समिति, भारतीय कम्युनिस्ट पार्टी (मार्क्सवादी-लेनिनवादी)	CRC, CPI(ML)
India	Leading Committee, Revolutionary Communist Party, India	अग्रणी समिति, क्रांतिकारी कम्युनिस्ट पार्टी, भारत	LC, RCP
Iran	Union of Iranian Communists (Sarbedaran)	اتحادیه کمونیست‌های ایران	
Italy	Communist Collective of Agit/Prop	Collettivo Comunista Agit/Prop	CCA/P
Italy	Proletarian Communist Organisation, Marxist–Leninist	Organizzazione Comunista Proletaria, Marxista-Leninista	PCO, ML
Nepal	Communist Party of Nepal (Masal)	नेपाल कम्युनिष्ट पार्टी (मसाल)	CPN(M)
New Zealand	New Zealand Red Flag Group		NZFLG
Peru	Communist Party of Peru	Partido Comunista del Perú	PCP
Sri Lanka	Ceylon Communist Party (Maoist)	ලංකා කොමියුනිස්ට් පක්ෂය (මාඕවාදී) சிலோன் கம்யூனிஸ்ட் கட்சி (மாவோயிஸ்ட்)	CPC(M)
Turkey	Communist Party of Turkey/Marxist–Leninist	Türkiye Komünist Partisi/Marksist-Leninist	TKP/ML
United Kingdom	Nottingham Communist Group		
United Kingdom	Stockport Communist Group		
United States	Revolutionary Communist Party, USA		RCP

The Communist Party of Nepal (Masal) left over differences of political line, but a much larger group, the Communist Party of Nepal (Maoist Centre), is a member. Indian member organizations amalgamated into the Communist Party of India (Maoist).

== Magazine ==
A World to Win was published from 1981 to 2006 as the unofficial magazine of the Committee of RIM (CoRIM). Communist Party of India (Maoist) leader Ajith (Murali Kannampilly) was the editor of the magazine.

== Criticism ==
The Revolutionary Communist Party of Britain (Marxist–Leninist) has criticized the Revolutionary Internationalist Movement (RIM) for what it perceives as ultra-left revisionism, characterized by dogmatism and sectarianism. The party contends that RIM's neglect of critical Maoist concepts, such as the mass line and the theory of the new democratic revolution, alongside a focus on Eurocentrism, detracts from the effectiveness of the global revolutionary movement. This criticism points to RIM's strategies as being out of step with the practical demands of revolutionary activity, especially in the context of the Third World's class struggle.
