= Anti-revisionism =

Marxist–Leninist political position

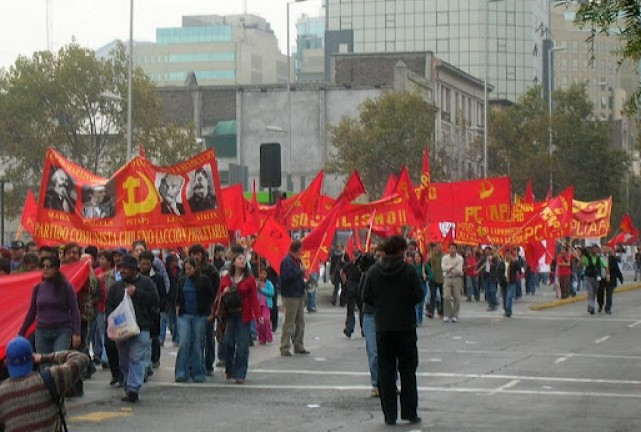
Supporters of the anti-revisionist Chilean Communist Party (Proletarian Action) march during the May Day 2007 manifestations in Santiago, Chile, carrying a banner with the portraits of Karl Marx, Friedrich Engels, Vladimir Lenin and Joseph Stalin.

Anti-revisionism is a position within Marxism–Leninism which emerged in the mid-1950s in opposition to the reforms of Soviet first secretary Nikita Khrushchev.

== History ==
When Khrushchev pursued an interpretation that differed from his predecessor, Joseph Stalin, anti-revisionists within the international communist movement remained dedicated to Stalin's ideological legacy and criticized the Soviet Union under Khrushchev and his successors as state capitalist and social imperialist. During the Sino-Soviet split, the Chinese Communist Party, led by Mao Zedong; the Party of Labour of Albania, led by Enver Hoxha; and some other communist parties and organizations around the world denounced the Khrushchev line as revisionist.

Mao Zedong first denounced the Soviet Union as revisionist at a meeting in January 1962. In early 1963, Mao returned to Beijing after a prolonged visit to Wuhan and Hangzhou, and issued a call to combat domestic revisionism in China. A 'central anti-revisionist drafting group' was formally constituted, led by Kang Sheng, which drafted anti-revisionist polemics, which were later personally reviewed by Mao before publication. The 'Nine Articles' emerged as the centre-piece of anti-Soviet polemics. Anti-revisionism would emerge as a key theme in Chinese foreign and domestic policies, reaching a peak during the 1966 Cultural Revolution. China friendship associations turned into anti-revisionist organizations, and Western Europe anti-revisionist splinter groups began to emerge (such as the Marxist-Leninist Communist Party of France, the Grippa group in Belgium, and the Lenin Centre in Switzerland). In Beijing, the street where the Soviet embassy was located was symbolically renamed as 'Anti-Revisionism Street'. In the wake of the 1964 split in the Communist Party of India, the Communist Party of India (Marxist) would reject Soviet positions as revisionist, but the party did not fully adopt a pro-Chinese line.

During the Deng Xiaoping administration in the late 1970s, anti-revisionist themes began to be downplayed in official Chinese discourse. The Chinese Academy of Sciences stated that the 'Nine Articles' had been wrong in focusing on the revisionism of the Soviet Union, rather than the threats of Soviet hegemonism and expansionism.

== See also ==
- Anti-Stalinist left
- Hoxhaism
- List of anti-revisionist groups
- Maoism
- Stalinism
