= List of political parties in Germany =

The Federal Republic of Germany has a plural multi-party system. Historically, the largest by members and parliament seats are the Christian Democratic Union (CDU), with its sister party, the Christian Social Union (CSU) and Social Democratic Party of Germany (SPD). Germany also has a number of other parties, in recent history most importantly the Free Democratic Party (FDP), Alliance 90/The Greens, The Left, and more recently the Alternative for Germany (AfD). The federal government of Germany often consisted of a coalition of a major and a minor party, specifically CDU/CSU and FDP or SPD and FDP, and from 1998 to 2005 SPD and Greens. From 1966 to 1969, from 2005 to 2009, from 2013 to 2021 and since 2025, the federal government consisted of a coalition of the two major parties, called a grand coalition.

Coalitions in the Bundestag and state legislatures are often described by party colors. Party colors are red for the Social Democratic Party, green for Alliance 90/The Greens, yellow for the Free Democratic Party, purple (officially red, which is customarily used for the SPD) for the Left, light blue for the AfD, and black and blue for the CDU and CSU respectively.

== Current parties ==
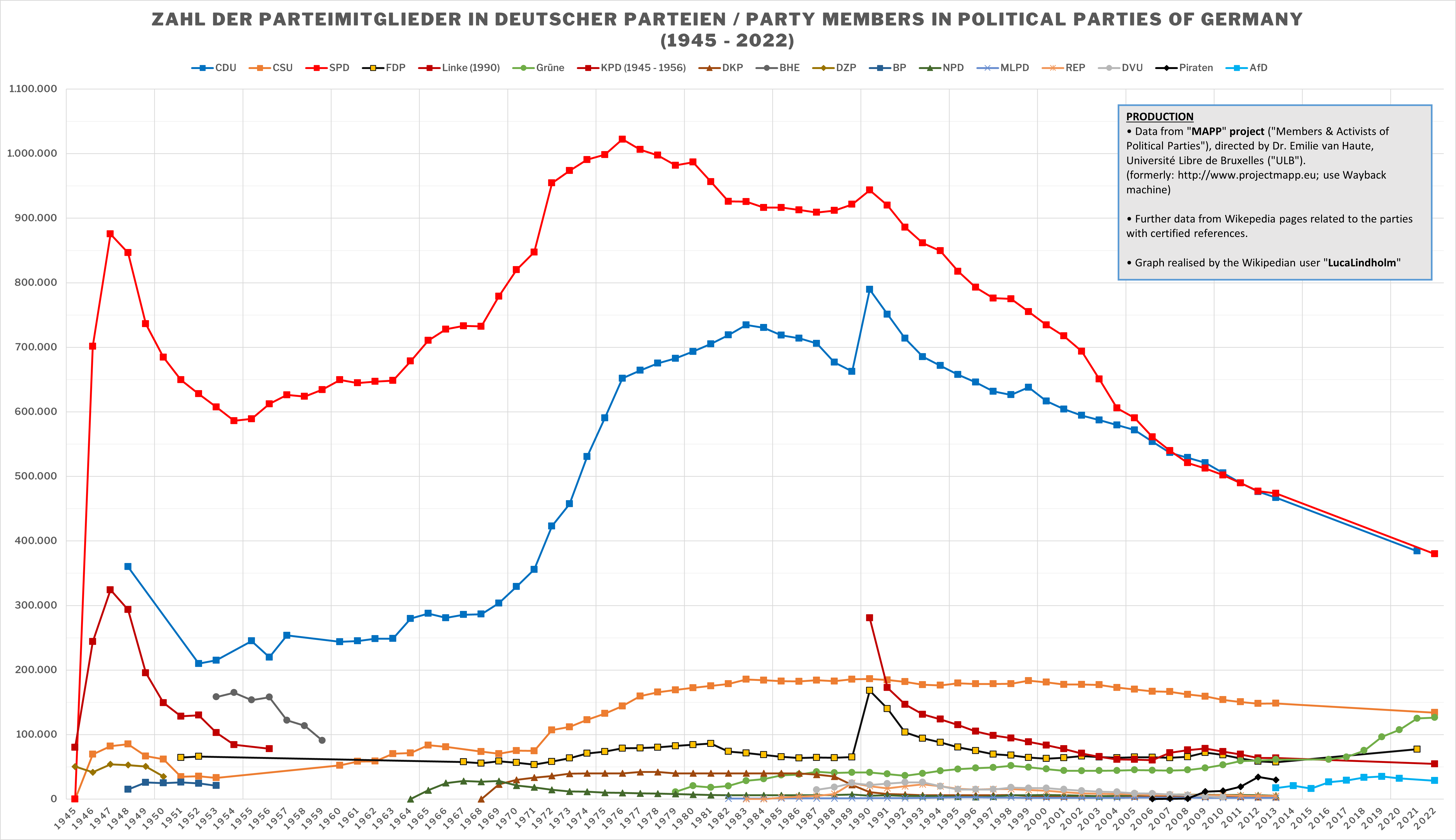
Party membership in Germany (since 1945; East German parties joined in 1990)

=== Parties represented in the Bundestag ===
Party	Abbr.	Ideology	Political position	Leader(s)	MdBs	MEPs	MdLs	EU party	EP group	Membership
Christian Democratic Union; Christlich Demokratische Union	CDU	Christian democracy; Conservatism	Centre-right	Friedrich Merz	164 / 630	23 / 96	525 / 1,893	EPP	EPP	356,769 (2025 est.)
Christian Social Union in Bavaria; Christlich-Soziale Union in Bayern	CSU	Christian democracy; Conservatism; Bavarian regionalism	Centre-right	Markus Söder	44 / 630	6 / 96	85 / 1,893	EPP	EPP	125,300 (2024)
Alternative for Germany; Alternative für Deutschland	AfD	Right-wing populism; Völkisch nationalism; Euroscepticism	Far-right	Tino Chrupalla; Alice Weidel	151 / 630	15 / 96	275 / 1,893	ESN	ESN	75,000 (Jul 2026)
Social Democratic Party of Germany; Sozialdemokratische Partei Deutschlands	SPD	Social democracy	Centre-left	Lars Klingbeil; Saskia Esken	120 / 630	14 / 96	455 / 1,893	PES	S&D	348,451 (2025)
Alliance 90/The Greens; Bündnis 90/Die Grünen	Grüne	Green politics; Social liberalism	Centre-left	Felix Banaszak; Franziska Brantner	85 / 630	12 / 96	314 / 1,893	EGP	G/EFA	166,000 (Feb 2025)
The Left; Die Linke	Linke	Democratic socialism; Left-wing populism	Left-wing	Luigi Pantisano; Ines Schwerdtner	64 / 630	3 / 96	117 / 1,893	PEL	GUE/NGL	123,126 (Dec 2025)
South Schleswig Voters' Association; Südschleswigscher Wählerverband	SSW	Regionalism; Danish interests; Frisian interests		Christian Dirschauer	1 / 630	0 / 96	4 / 1,893	EFA	G/EFA	3,216 (2020)

=== Parties represented in the European Parliament ===
Party	Abbr.	Ideology	Political position	Leader(s)	MEPs	MdLs	European party	EP group	Membership
Alliance for Social Justice and Economic Reason; Bündnis Soziale Gerechtigkeit und Wirtschaftliche Vernunft	BSW	Socialism; Cultural conservatism; Left-wing populism	Left-wing to far-left (Note: BSW is widely considered far-left, but it was also described as left-wing or left-conservative; the latter label is because some stances of the party on cultural issues are seen as conservative.)	Fabio De Masi; Amira Mohamed Ali	5 / 96	25 / 1,893	—N/a	NI	11,200 (Dec 2025)
Free Democratic Party; Freie Demokratische Partei	FDP	Classical liberalism; Pro-Europeanism	Centre-right	Wolfgang Kubicki	5 / 96	30 / 1,893	ALDE	RE	70,000 (Nov 2024)
Free Voters; Freie Wähler	FW	Liberal conservatism; Regionalism; Soft Euroscepticism	Centre-right	Hubert Aiwanger	3 / 96	37 / 1,893	EDP	RE	6,225 (2020)
Volt Germany; Volt Deutschland	Volt	Social liberalism; Pro-Europeanism; European federalism	Centre-left	Lara Neumann; Tim Marton	3 / 96	0 / 1,893	VOLT	G/EFA	8,572
The PARTY; Die PARTEI		Political satire; Anti-fascism; Environmentalism; Pro-Europeanism	Left-wing	Martin Sonneborn	1 / 96	0 / 1,893	—N/a	NI	51,078
Ecological Democratic Party; Ökologisch-Demokratische Partei	ÖDP	Green conservatism	Centre-right	Christian Rechholz	1 / 96	0 / 1,893	EFA	EPP	8,035
Party of Progress; Partei des Fortschritts	PdF	Grassroots democracy; Social liberalism; Pro-Europeanism	Centre-left	Lukas Sieper	1 / 96	0 / 1,893	—N/a	RE	800
Family Party of Germany; Familien-Partei Deutschlands	Familie	Conservatism; Familialism; Christian democracy	Centre-right to right-wing	Helmut Geuking	1 / 96	0 / 1,893	ECPM	EPP	705
Human Environment Animal Protection Party; Partei Mensch Umwelt Tierschutz	PMUT	Animal rights; Environmentalism	Left-wing	Aida Spiegeler Castaneda; Marcel Krohn; Robert Gabel	1 / 96	0 / 1,893	APEU	GUE/NGL	2,400

=== Parties only represented in state parliaments ===
Name	Abbr.	Ideology	Political position	Result in 2021 federal election	Leader(s)	MdLs	State(s)	EP party	EP group	Membership
Alliance Germany; Bündnis Deutschland	BD	Conservatism	Centre-right to right-wing	(did not exist)	Steffen Grosse	7 / 1,893	Bremen	-	ECR	1,000
Values Union; WerteUnion	WU	National conservatism Right-wing populism	Right-wing	– (did not exist)	Hans-Georg Maaßen	1 / 1,893	Lower Saxony	–	–	4,000
Thuringia.Just; Thuringia.Gerecht	TG	-	-	(did not exist)	Katja Wolf	9 / 1,893	Thuringia	-	-	-

=== Minor parties ===
Name	Abbr.	Leader(s)	Ideology	Political position	EP group	Membership
Action Citizens for Justice; Aktion Bürger für Gerechtigkeit	ABG	Alfred Dorn	Direct democracy Alternative medicine Right-wing populism Nationalism	Right-wing		121
Action Party for Animal Welfare; Aktion Partei für Tierschutz	Tierschutz hier!	Thomas Schwarz	Animal rights Animal welfare	Single-issue		50
Alliance C – Christians for Germany; Bündnis C – Christen für Deutschland	Bündnis C	Karin Heepen & Ole Steffes	Conservatism; Christian fundamentalism	Right-wing	ECPM	1,078
Alliance for Human Rights, Animal and Nature Protection; Allianz für Menschenrechte, Tier- und Naturschutz	Tierschutzallianz	Josef Fassl	Animal rights	Single-issue		97
Alliance for Innovation and Justice; Bündnis für Innovation und Gerechtigkeit	BIG	Haluk Yildiz	Political Islam			2,000
Alliance of German Democrats; Allianz Deutscher Demokraten	AD-Demokraten	Ramazan Akbaş	Conservatism; Political Islam			2,500
AlphaHHP; AlphaHHP - gesundheitspolitische Partei für Deutschland in Europa	AlphaHHP		Anti-vaccination			
Anarchist Pogo Party of Germany; Anarchistische Pogo-Partei Deutschlands	APPD	Peter Vehreschild	Satire	Apoliticism		2,512
Arminius – Association of the German People; Arminius – Bund des deutschen Volkes	Arminius – Bund	Johann Thießen	Russia German interests German nationalism Neo-nazism	Far-right		40
Awakening Peace-Sovereignty-Justice; Aufbruch Frieden-Souveränität-Gerechtigkeit	Aufbruch	Markus Beisicht	Russophilia; Antimilitarism; Anti-Atlanticism	Right-wing		
Association for Freedom and Humanity; BUND FÜR FREIHEIT UND HUMANITÄT		Anton Stucki	Liberalism			40
Basic Income Alliance; Bündnis Grundeinkommen	BGE	Martin Sonnabend	Universal basic income	Single-issue		350
Basic Income for All; Grundeinkommen für Alle	GFA	Uwe Bjorck	Universal basic income	Single-issue		27
Bavaria Party; Bayernpartei	BP	Florian Weber	Autonomism; Bavarian nationalism Regionalism; Conservatism	Centre-right	EFA	3,926
Bergpartei, die "ÜberPartei"; Bergpartei, die Überpartei	B*	Yanachasca Laso Solari	Post-left anarchy Dadaism	Far-left		229
Brandenburg United Civic Movements/Free Voters; Brandenburger Vereinigte Bürgerbewegungen / Freie Wähler	BVB/FW	Péter Vida	Regionalism			910
German Centre Party; Deutsche Zentrumspartei	ZENTRUM	Christian Otte	Christian democracy Conservatism; Social conservatism	Centre-right		300
Climate List Germany; Klimaliste Deutschland	KL	Fabian Aisenbrey, Doris Vollmer	Climate change mitigation			234
Citizens for Germany; Bürger für Deutschland	BfD		Direct democracy			
Citizens for Progress and Change; Bürger für Fortschritt und Wandel	BFW	Uwe Hück	Progressivism	Centre-left		170
Civic and Economic-Ecological Union; Bürgerliche und wirtschaftsökologische Union	BWUnion		Liberalism; Nationalism			
Civil Rights Movement Solidarity; Bürgerrechtsbewegung Solidarität	BüSo	Helga Zepp-LaRouche	LaRouche movement	Syncretic		556
Communist Party; Kommunistische Partei	KP	Central Committee	Communism; Marxism–Leninism; Anti-revisionism	Far-left		
Communist Party of Germany; Kommunistische Partei Deutschlands	KPD	Torsten Schöwitz	Communism; Marxism–Leninism; Anti-revisionism; Stalinism	Far-left		165
Democratic Alliance for Diversity and Awakening; Demokratische Allianz für Vielfalt und Aufbruch	DAVA	Teyfik Ozcan	Turkish minority interests Erdoğanism			1,000
Democratic Union of Germany; Demokratische Vereinigung Deutschland	DVD	Werner Krüger	Reformism; Direct democracy Universal basic income			
Democratic Liberal LEAGUE; Demokratisch Liberale LIGA	LIGA	Thomas H. Stütz	Conservatism	Centre-right		
Democracy DIRECT! Demokratie DIREKT!	DIE DIREKTE!	Christian Rombeck	Direct democracy			34
Democratic Left; Demokratische Linke	DL	Eckehart Ehrenberg	Democratic socialism	Left-wing		43
Ecological Left; Ökologische Linke	ÖkoLinX		Grassroots democracy Eco-socialism; Anti-fascism	Left-wing to far-left		350
Ecological-Left Liberal Democratic Party; Ökolinksliberale Demokratische Partei	ÖLDP	Bérangère Bultheel	Social democracy Social liberalism European Federalism	Centre-left		70
Educate Berlin! Bildet Berlin!	Bildet Berlin!	Florian Bublys, Tamara Adamzik	Education reform	Single-issue		50
European Party Love; Europäische Partei Liebe	LIEBE		European federalism Subsidized marriage			53
Feminist Party The Women; Feministische Partei Die Frauen	DIE FRAUEN	Renate Schmidtsdorff-Aicher	Feminism			400
Free Citizens' Union; Freie Bürger Union	FBU	Walter Pfleiderer	National liberalism Conservatism; Nationalism	Right-wing		
Free Horizon; Freier Horizont	FREiER HORIZONT	Norbert Schumacher	Anti-Wind turbine	Single-issue		40
Free Saxons; Freie Sachsen	FS	Martin Kohlmann	Saxon monarchism Regionalism	Right-wing to Far-right		1,200
From Now on... Democracy Through Referendum; Ab jetzt … Demokratie durch Volksabstimmung	Volksabstimmung	Helmut Fleck	Direct Democracy; Nationalism	Right-wing		350
Future. Zukunft.	Z.	Lasse Lorenzen	Regionalism			112
future! future!	future!	Stephan Bublitz	Youth interests			
Garden Party; Gartenpartei	Gartenpartei	Roland Zander	Pro-Allotment; Environmentalism			349
German Centre; Deutsche Mitte	DM	Sven Hüther	Right-wing populism Anti-vaccination	Right-wing		500
German Conservatives; Deutsche Konservative	Deutsche Konservative	Dieter Jochim	Conservatism; National conservatism	Centre-right to right-wing		380
German Communist Party; Deutsche Kommunistische Partei	DKP	Patrik Köbele	Communism; Marxism–Leninism	Far-left		2,850
German Land Economy; Deutsch Land Wirtschaft	DLW	Benjamin Meise	Farmer interests			15
German Party – The Freedomites; Deutsche Partei – Die Freiheitlichen	DP	Gerd-Uwe Dahlmann	National conservatism German nationalism Right-wing populism	Right-wing		250
German Sports Party; Deutsche Sportpartei	DSP	Michael Möller	Grassroots democracy Sport for social development Anti-Doping			
German Social Union; Deutsche Soziale Union	DSU	Roberto Rink	National conservatism Social conservatism	Right-wing		1,060
Germans Originating from all of Germany (Autochthons); Aus Gesamtdeutschland stammende Deutsche (Autochthone)	AGsD	Horst Zaborowski	Nationalism; Irredentism; Direct democracy			
Grassroots Democratic Party of Germany; Basisdemokratische Partei Deutschland	dieBasis	Reiner Fuellmich, Viviane Fischer	Anti-lockdown; Anti-vaccination			18,988
Good-People-Party; Gut-Menschen-Partei	Gut-Menschen	Carl Philipp Trump				9
Human Economy Party; Humanwirtschaftspartei	Humanwirtschaft	Dieter Müller	Freiwirtschaft			110
Human world - for the well-being and happiness of all Menschliche Welt – für das Wohl und Glücklichsein aller	MENSCHLICHE WELT	Michael Moritz	Progressive utilization theory Anti-vaccination; Pacifism			669
INDEPENDENTS for citizen-friendly democracy UNABHÄNGIGE für bürgernahe Demokratie	UNABHÄNGIGE	Werner Fischer	Non-partisan democracy Direct democracy			86
Liberal Democrats – The Social Liberals; Liberale Demokraten – Die Sozialliberalen	LD	Bernd Grothkopp	Social liberalism			100
Lobbyists for Children; Lobbyisten für Kinder	LfK	Johanna Nelkner, Fabio Libonati	Children's rights			100
Lusatian Alliance; Lausitzer Allianz / Łužiska Alianca / Łužyska Alianca		Hannes Wilhelm-Kell	Regionalism; Progressivism; Ethnic minority interests			90
Marxist–Leninist Party of Germany; Marxistisch-Leninistische Partei Deutschlands	MLPD	Gabi Fechtner	Marxism–Leninism; Communism	Far-left		2,800
Mindful Democrats; Achtsame Demokraten	Die Achtsamen					
Modern Social Party; Moderne Soziale Partei	MSP					
mut mut	mut	Claudia Stamm	Social liberalism	Centre-left		400
MERA25; MERA25	MERA25	Julijana Zita	Progressivism; Direct democracy	Left-wing	DiEM25	2,000
National Democratic Party of Germany; Nationaldemokratische Partei Deutschlands	NPD	Lennart Schwarzbach	Neo-Nazism	Far-right		
neo. Wellbeing for all neo. Wohlstand für alle	neo.	Jörg Gastmann	Economic Balance System; Universal basic income Grassroots democracy			
New Strength Party; Neue Stärke Partei	NSP	Sara Storch, Christoph Thews	Neo-Nazism	Far-right		100
One for all - Party; Eine für Alle - Partei	Eine für Alle		Grassroots democracy			13
Party for Franconia; Partei für Franken	DIE FRANKEN	Robert Gattenlöhner	Regionalism			237
Party for Rejuvenation Research; Partei für schulmedizinische Verjüngungsforschung		Felix Werth	Single-issue politics	Single-issue		289
Party of Humanists; Partei der Humanisten	PdH	Felicitas Klings	Humanism; Secularism; Civil libertarianism Social liberalism			2,350
Party of Reason; Partei der Vernunft	PdV	Friedrich Dominicus	Right-libertarianism; Euroscepticism	Right-wing	EPIL	352
PETO; PETO	PETO	Lydia Hannawald	Youth interests			400
Pirate Party Germany; Piratenpartei Deutschland	PIRATEN	Borys Sobieski	Pirate politics E-democracy; Direct democracy Social liberalism European federalism	Centre-left	Greens/EFA	5,541
Renters Party; Mieterpartei	MIETERPARTEI	Anke Hahn, Hartmut Bräunlich	Anti-high rent Tenant rights	Centre-left		50
Saxon People's Party; Sächsische Volkspartei	SVP	Mirko Schmidt	Nationalism	Far-right		
SGV – Solidarity, Equity, Change; SGV – Solidarität, Gerechtigkeit, Veränderung	SGV		Anti-corruption			
Socialist Equality Party; Sozialistische Gleichheitspartei	SGP	Ulrich Rippert	Trotskyism	Far-left		276
Standing up socially just intelligent party Aufstehen sozial gerechte intelligente Partei	Aufstehenpartei	Paul Weiler	Left-wing populism	Centre-left to Left-wing		
Statt Party; Statt Partei	STATT	Robert W. Hugo	Populism			200
Transnational Unity, Solidarity, and Libertarianism Advocates; Transnationale Einheit´s, Solidarität´s und Libertarismus Advokaten	TESLA	Norbert Wiesweg	Sinti and Romani interests			
The Justice Party – Team Todenhöfer; Die Gerechtigkeitspartei – Team Todenhöfer		Jürgen Todenhöfer	Anti-militarism; Populism			5,314
The Glass clear Die Glasklar	DGK	Marie-José Velonjara	Social democracy Populism			
The Federals; DIE FÖDERALEN	DIE FÖDERALEN	Maren Zaidan	Liberalism; Federalism; Progressivism			
The Grays – For all Generations; Die Grauen – Für alle Generationen	Die Grauen	Michael Schulz	Intergenerationality			135
The Homeland; Die Heimat	HEIMAT	Peter Schreiber	Neo-Nazism; Ultranationalism; Pan-Germanism; Anti-immigration; Revanchism	Far-right	APF	3,000
The House of Germany; Das Haus Deutschland	DHD	Egbert Besler	Constitutionalism; Social democracy			
The Reformers; Die Reformer	REFORMER	Erich Schuster	Liberalism; Pro-Europeanism			
The III. Path; Der III. Weg	III. Weg	Matthias Fischer	Neo-Nazism; Strasserism; Ethnic nationalism German nationalism Hard Euroscepticism	Far-right		642
The Modernity die Moderne		Martin Martens	Centrism	Centre		
The New Centre; Die Neue Mitte - Zurück zur Vernunft	NM	Christoph Hörstel	Sovereignism; Euroscepticism; Anti-vaccination; Russophilia	Right-wing		
The New Democrats; Die neuen Demokraten			Security			
The Libertarians; Die Libertären	DIE LIBERTÄREN	Dr. Mathias Hummel	Libertarianism; Laissez-faire; Economic liberalism			
THE OTHERS; DIE SONSTIGEN	sonstige		Democratic confederalism Progressivism; Anti-militarism	Left-wing		171
The Party of Sorbians die partei der sorben	PDS	Lars Krause	Political satire Sorbian Separatism; Anti-militarism			
The Pink/ Alliance21; Die Pinken/Bündnis21	BÜNDNIS21		Anti-corruption			450
The Republicans; Die Republikaner	REP	Tilo Schöne	German nationalism National conservatism Euroscepticism; Social conservatism	Right-wing		4,533
The Sharks – Party with bite Die Haie – Partei mit Biss	HAIE	Jan Heie Erchinger	Pragmatism	Centre		
The Peace Party; Die Friedenspartei		Mahmoud Ahmed	Pacifism			
The Urbans. A HipHop Party; Die Urbane. Eine HipHop Partei	du	Niki Drakos, Raphael Hillebrand	Social justice Environmentalism			303
The Violets; Die Violetten	Die Violetten	Irene Garcia Garcia	Spiritualism; Direct democracy Environmentalism			678
Thuringian Homeland Party; Thüringer Heimatpartei	THP	Timo Pradel				56
We Citizens; Wir Bürger	LKR	Jürgen Joost	Liberal conservatism; Economic liberalism; Soft Euroscepticism	Centre-right to right-wing	ECR Party	1,000
V-Partei³ – Party for Change, Vegetarians and Vegans; V-Partei³ – Partei für Veränderung, Vegetarier und Veganer	V³	Roland Wegner	Animal rights Environmentalism			1,200
Waying C Aufbruch C		Andreas Epp	Christian democracy Conservatism	Right-wing		74
WiR2020; WiR2020	W2020	Wolfgang Romberg, Sonja Früh	Anti-vaccinationism; Anti-lockdown			4,600

== Historical parties ==
=== Defunct parties in the Federal Republic of Germany ===
Logo	Name	Abbr.	Leader(s)	Ideology	Est.	Diss.	Note
	50Plus The Generation-Alliance; 50Plus Das Generationen-Bündnis	50Plus	Hans Werner Müller	Right-wing populism	2004	2009	
	Action Democratic Progress; Aktion Demokratischer Fortschritt	ADF	Collective leadership	Communism	1968	1969	
	Action Group Fourth Party; Aktionsgemeinschaft Vierte Partei	AVP	Christian Ernst Dietrich Bahner	National conservatism	1975	1978	
	Action Group of Independent Germans; Aktionsgemeinschaft Unabhängiger Deutscher	AUD	August Haußleiter (1968–1980)	German nationalism Environmentalism; Neutrality	1965	1980	Merged into The Greens
	Active Democracy direct Aktive Demokratie direkt	ADd		Direct democracy E-democracy	2011	2016	
	All-German Bloc/League of Expellees and Deprived of Rights; Gesamtdeutscher Block/Bund der Heimatvertriebenen und Entrechteten	GB/BHE	Waldemar Kraft (1951–1954)	National conservatism German nationalism Expellee interests	1950	1961	Merged into DP
	All-German Party of Germany; Gesamtdeutsche Partei Deutschlands	GPD	Frank Seiboth, Herbert Schneider	National conservatism German nationalism Expellee interests	1961	1981	Merger of GB/BHE and DP
	All-German People's Party; Gesamtdeutsche Volkspartei	GVP	Gustav Heinemann	Anti-Western integration Christian democracy Anti-militarism; Neutrality	1952	1957	Split from CDU, merged into SPD
	Alliance for Health, Peace and Social Justice; Allianz für Gesundheit, Frieden und soziale Gerechtigkeit	AGFG	Matthias Rath	Alternative medicine	2005	2009	
	Alliance of Germans, Party for Unity, Peace and Freedom; Bund der Deutschen, Partei für Einheit, Frieden und Freiheit	BdD	Josef Weber (1964–1968)	Anti-Western integration Anti-militarism; Neutrality	1953	1968	Merged into DFU
	Alliance of the Centre; Allianz der Mitte	ADM	Hans Weide	Conservatism	2004	2012	Merged into Deutsche Konservative
	Automobile Taxpayers Party; Automobile Steuerzahler-Partei	ASP		Motorist interests	1993	2002	
	Awakening of German patriots – Central Germany; Aufbruch deutscher Patrioten – Mitteldeutschland	ADPM	Benjamin Przybylla	Right-wing populism National conservatism Nationalism	2019	2020	
	Awakening for civil rights, freedom and health Aufbruch für Bürgerrechte, Freiheit und Gesundheit	AUFBRUCH	Hans Christoph Scheiner	Anti-wireless expansion Alternative medicine	1998	2012	
	Christian Centre; Christliche Mitte — Für ein Deutschland nach GOTTES Geboten	CM	Josef Happel	National conservatism Christian conservatism Social conservatism	1988	2016	Still exists as a think tank
	Christian Falangist Party of Germany; Christlich Falangistische Partei Deutschlands	CFPD		Falangism; Zionism	2006	2009	
	Christian League - The Party for Life; Christliche Liga – Die Partei für das Leben	LIGA	Ewald Jaksch	Christian right Conservatism	1985	1995	
	Citizens for Mecklenburg-Vorpommern; Bürger für Mecklenburg-Vorpommern	BMV	Michael Bertram	Conservatism; Regionalism	2018	2018	Split from AfD, merged into Free Voters
	Citizens for Thuringia; Bürger für Thüringen	BfTh	Ute Bergner	Right-wing populism	2020	2024	Merged into Values Union
	Communist League of West Germany; Kommunistischer Bund Westdeutschland	KBW	Joscha Schmierer (1973–1982)	Maoism	1973	1985	
	Communist Party of Germany (Roter Morgen); Kommunistische Partei Deutschlands (Roter Morgen)	KPD (Roter Morgen)		Communism; Marxism–Leninism; Anti-revisionism; Hoxhaism	1985	2011	Split from KPD/ML
	Communist Party of Germany/Marxists–Leninists; Kommunistische Partei Deutschlands/Marxisten-Leninisten	KPD/ML	Ernst Aust (1968–1983)	Communism; Marxism–Leninism; Anti-revisionism; Hoxhaism	1968	1986	Newspaper still exists
	Communist Party of Germany; Kommunistische Partei Deutschlands	KPD	Max Reimann (1948–1956)	Communism; Marxism–Leninism	1918	1956	Banned in 1956
	Democracy in Motion; Demokratie in Bewegung	DiB	Julia Beerhold, Alexander Plitsch	Democratic socialism	2017	2025	
	Democratic Gay/Lesbian Party - The People's Party; Demokratische Schwul / Lesbische Partei - Die Bürgerpartei	DSLP	Thomas Mosmann	Homonationalism; Anti-Islam	2013	2016	
	Democratic Left; Demokratische Linke	DL	Eugen Eberle	Socialism	1967	1970	
	Democratic Socialists; Demokratische Sozialisten	DS		Eurocommunism	1982	1991	
	Democratic Party of Germany; Demokratische Partei Deutschlands	DPD	Markus Giersch	Socialism of the 21st century Universal basic income Grassroots democracy	2009	2015	
	Drivers' and Peoples' Interest Party; Autofahrer- und Volksinteressenpartei	AViP	Andreas Uhing	Motorist interests Euroscepticism	2011	2016	
	Drivers' and Citizens' Interest Party; Autofahrer- und Bürgerinteressenpartei Deutschlands	APD	Anton K. Marth	Motorist interests	1988	2002	
	Equality Party; Gerechtigkeitspartei	G			1973	1978	
	European Federalist Party; Europäische Föderalistische Partei	EFP	Karl Hahn	European federalism	1964	1994	
	European Workers-Party; Europäische Arbeiter-Partei	EAP	Helga Zepp-LaRouche	LaRouche movement	1974	1986	Succeeded by Patrioten
	Expellee and Migrants Party of Germany – Unity; Aussiedler und Migranten Partei Deutschland – EINHEIT	DIE EINHEIT	Dimitri Rempel	Russophilia; Conservatism; Expellee interests	2013	?	
	Federation for a Complete Germany; Bund für Gesamtdeutschland	BGD	Horst Zaborowski	Revanchism; Nationalism	1990	2017	Merged with AGsD
	Free Citizens Central Germany; Freie Bürger Mitteldeutschland	FBM	Andreas Koch	Regionalism	2011	2025	Merged into PdF
	Free Citizens' Initiative; Freie Bürger-Initiative	FBI	Dr. Thomas Kernebeck	Direct democracy	1994	?	
	Free German People's Party; Freiheitliche Deutsche Volkspartei	FDVP		Nationalism	2000	2003	Split from DVU, merged into DP
	Free German Workers' Party; Freiheitliche Deutsche Arbeiterpartei	FAP	Friedhelm Busse (1988–1995)	Neo-Nazism; Strasserism	1979	1995	Banned in 1995 (as organization)
	Freiparlamentarische Allianz; Freiparlamentarische Allianz	FPA	Luca Piwodda	Participatory democracy	2018	2024	Merged into PdF
	Free Union; Freie Union	FU	Danny Hoffmann	Conservatism; Direct democracy Economic liberalism	2009	2019	
	The Frisians; Die Friesen	FRIESEN	Ralf Bieneck	Ethnic minority interests	2007	2023	
	German Community; Deutsche Gemeinschaft	DG	August Haußleiter (1952–1965)	German nationalism Anti-militarism; Revanchism; Neutrality	1949	1965	Merged into AUD
	German Democratic Party; Deutsche Demokratische Partei	ddp	Thorsten Sandvoß	Third way Universal basic income	2004	2015	
	German Empire Party; Deutsche Reichspartei	DRP	Heinrich Kunstmann; Adolf von Thadden; Alexander Andrae	Neo-Nazism (after 1952); Pan-Germanism; German nationalism	1950	1956	Merger of DRP and NDP
	German Freedom Party; Deutsche Freiheitspartei	DFP	Heinrich Kunstmann	German nationalism Strasserism; Neutrality	1962	1964	Split from DRP, merged into AUD
	German Freedom Party; Die Freiheit – Bürgerrechtspartei für mehr Freiheit und Demokratie	DIE FREIHEIT	Michael Stürzenberger	Classical liberalism Direct democracy Right-wing populism Hard Euroscepticism	2010	2016	
	German-Hanoverian Party; Deutsch-Hannoversche Partei	DHP	Hans Wilhelm Griemsmann	Conservatism; Federalism	1953	1962	Split from 1947 DP, rejoined remnant-DP
	German Party; Deutsche Partei	DP	Heinrich Hellwege	German nationalism National conservatism Constitutional monarchism	1947	1961	
	German Party; Deutsche Partei	DP	Adolf von Thadden (after 1967)	National conservatism	1961	1980	Founded by former members of the 1947 DP
	German Peace Union; Deutsche Friedens-Union	DFU		Pacifism; Neutrality; Anti-militarism	1960	1984/90	
	German People's Union; Deutsche Volksunion	DVU	Matthias Faust (2009–2011)	Pan-Germanism; National conservatism Right-wing populism	1971/87	2011	Split from and merged into NPD
	German Protestant League; Deutsche Protestantische Liga	DEUPROLIGA		Christian democracy	2020	2023	
	German Reconstruction Party; Deutsche Aufbaupartei	D|A|P	Tobias Stober	D-Mark reintroduction	2017	2019	
	German Social Movement; Deutsch-Soziale Bewegung	DSB	Karl-Heinz Priester	Neo-fascism; Corporatism; Pan-European nationalism	1949	1970s	Merged into FSVP
	German Social Union; Deutsch-Soziale Union	DSU	Otto Strasser	Strasserism; Revolutionary nationalism	1956	1962	
	German Solidarity - Union for the Environment and Life Protection; Deutsche Solidarität – Union für Umwelt und Lebensschutz	Öko-Union	Horst Götting	National conservatism	1978	1997	Split from AVP
	German Union; Deutsche Union	DU	Siegfried Zoglmann	National liberalism	1971	1980	
	Gray Panthers; Graue Panther	Graue Panther	Georg Schulte	Green politics Senior citizens interests	1989	2008	
	Humanist Party; Humanistische Partei	HP		New Humanism; Social liberalism Grassroots democracy	1984	2006	
	Independent Workers' Party (German Socialists); Unabhängige Arbeiter-Partei (Deutsche Sozialisten)	UAP	Ulrich Villmow (1995–2014)	Strasserism; Neue Rechte; European federalism Democratic socialism	1962	2014	Split from DSU, unofficial successor
	Independent Workers' Party of Germany; Unabhängige Arbeiterpartei Deutschlands	UAPD		Titoism; Trotskyism	1950	1952	
	Kreuzberg Patriotic Democrats/Realistic Center; Kreuzberger Patriotische Demokraten/Realistisches Zentrum	KPD/RZ	Hans Joachim Grimm	Satire; Anti-fascism	1988	2016	Merged into Die PARTEI
	Labour and Social Justice – The Electoral Alternative; Arbeit und soziale Gerechtigkeit – Die Wahlalternative	WASG	Klaus Ernst; Thomas Händel; Christine Buchholz; Axel Troost	Democratic socialism Trade unionism	2005	2007	Merged into The Left
	League of German Communists; Bund Deutscher Kommunisten	BDK		Communism; Marxism–Leninism	1972	?	Split from DKP
	Liberal People's Party; Freiheitliche Volkspartei	FVP	Franz Handlos	National conservatism Social conservatism	1985	1992	Split from The Republicans
	Maritime Union of Germany; Maritime Union Deutschland	MUD	Konrad Fischer	Fishermans' interests Social democracy Euroscepticism	2011	2012	
	Mature Citizens; Die Mündigen Bürger	Mündige Bürger	Erika Herbst	National conservatism Alternative medicine Esotericism	1975	1994	
	Motorist and citizens' interest party in Germany; Autofahrer- und Bürgerinteressenpartei Deutschlands	APD	Anton K. Marth (1988–1995)	Motorist interests	1988	2002	
	Muslim Democratic Union; Muslimische Demokratische Union	MDU	Bilal Uwe Wilbert	Islamism; Salafism	2010	2014	Merged into BIG
	National Democratic Empire Party; Nationaldemokratische Reichspartei	NDRP		Neo-Nazism	1950	1951	Merger of multiple smaller parties, succeeded by Young Party
	National Liberal Action; Nationalliberale Aktion	NLA	Erich Mende	National liberalism	1970	1971	
	National Party of Germany; Nationale Partei Deutschlands	NPD	Moritz von Faber (1956–62); Wolf Ewert (1952–56); Erwin Mebus (1950–52)	Neutralism; National Bolshevism	1950	1962	
	Natural Law Party; Naturgesetz-Partei, Aufbruch zu neuem Bewusstsein	NATURGESETZ		Transcendental Meditation	1992	2004	
	New consciousness - The holistic-esoteric party of Germany; Neues Bewußtsein die ganzheitlich-esoterische Partei Deutschlands	Bewußtsein		New-Age movement Esotericism	1989	?	
	New National Party; Neue Nationale Partei	NNP	Jens Tholen	Civic nationalism Social liberalism Anti-fascism	2014	2015	
	Noise torture-Environment-Politics-Honest; Lärmfolter-Umwelt-Politik-ehrlich	LUPe	Klaus Zimmer	Anti-Noise pollution	2013	2016	
	Parent Party; Elternpartei	Eltern	Werner Jock	Parents' interests	2005	2010	
	Party for a Rule of Law Offensive; Partei Rechtsstaatlicher Offensive	PRO	Ronald Schill (2000–2003)	Right-wing populism Conservatism	2000	2007	Commonly known as Schill-Partei
	Party for Labour, Environment and Family; AUF - Partei für Arbeit, Umwelt und Familie - Christen für Deutschland	AUF		Conservatism; Christian fundamentalism	2008	2015	Merged into Alliance C
	Party of Bible-abiding Christians; Partei Bibeltreuer Christen	PBC	Gerhard Heinzmann	Christian right Pentecostalism; Christian fundamentalism	1989	2015	Merged into Alliance C
	Party of Democratic Socialism; Partei des Demokratischen Sozialismus	PDS	Lothar Bisky (2003–2007)	Democratic socialism Left-wing populism	1989	2007	Merged into The Left
	Party of Non-Voters; Partei der Nichtwähler	Nichtwähler	Werner Peters	Protest party Direct democracy	1998	2016	
	Party of those willing to work and the socially disadvantaged Partei der Arbeitswilligen und Sozial Schwachen	PASS	Frank Knüppel (1998–2000)	Protest party Unemployed interests	1993	2009	
	Patriots for Germany; Patrioten für Deutschland	Patrioten	Helga Zepp-LaRouche	LaRouche movement National conservatism	1986	1992	Succeeded by BüSo
	Peace List; Die Friedensliste	FRIEDEN	1984–1986: Mechtild Jansen; Manfred Coppik; Hans Mausbach	Peace movement	1984	1989	
	Pensioners' Party of Germany; Rentner Partei Deutschland	RENTNER	Günter Pfeiffer	Senior citizens interests	2002	2016	
	Pensioners' Party; Rentnerinnen- und Rentner-Partei	RRP	Manfred Link	Senior citizens interests	2007	2016	
	Pro Germany Citizens' Movement; Bürgerbewegung pro Deutschland	pro Deutschland	Manfred Rouhs	Right-wing populism	2005	2017	
	Pro NRW; Bürgerbewegung pro NRW	pro NRW	Markus Beisicht	Right-wing populism Anti-immigration; Anti-Islam	2007	2019	
	Posadist Communist Party; Posadistische Kommunistische Partei		Paul Schulz	Posadism	1969	2005	
	Sarazzist Party ━ For Referendums; Sarazzistische Partei – für Volksentscheide	SPV	Kai Schulze	Sarrazism; Direct democracy	2010	2011	
	Social People's Party; Soziale Volkspartei	SVP	Ronny Grubert	Neo-Nazism; Militancy	1999	1999	Split from NPD
	Social People's Party of Germany; Soziale Volkspartei Deutschlands	SVD	Wolfgang Staschen	Social democracy Anti-immigration	1984	1984	
	Socialist Reich Party; Sozialistische Reichspartei Deutschlands	SRP	Otto Ernst Remer; Fritz Dorls; Gerhard Krüger	Neo-Nazism	1949	1952	Banned in 1952
	Socialist Unity Party of West Berlin; Sozialistische Einheitspartei Westberlins	SEW	Gerhard Danelius (1962–1978)	Communism; Marxism–Leninism	1962	1991	Split from SED
	Spartacus League; Spartacusbund	SpB		Trotskyism	1974	1980s	
	Red October; Roter Oktober	RO		Communism; Marxism–Leninism	2002	2009	Split from KPD (RO)
	Revolutionary Socialist League; Revolutionär Sozialistischer Bund/Vierte Internationale	RSB		Trotskyism	1994	2016	Merged into ISO
	The Blue Party; Die blaue Partei	Blaue #TeamPetry	Frauke Petry	National conservatism National liberalism Euroscepticism	2017	2019	Split from the AfD
	The Grays – Gray Panthers; Die Grauen – Graue Panther	GRAUE		Anti-Ageism; Green politics Senior citizens interests	1989	2008	Split into Die Grauen and Graue Panther
	The Right; Die Rechte	Die RECHTE	Christian Worch	Neo-Nazism; Ultranationalism; Pan-Germanism; Anti-immigration; Historical revisionism	2012	2025	
	The Social Liberals; Die Sozialliberalen	SL	Mikael Horstmann	Social liberalism European federalism	2014	2021	Still exists as a think tank
	The Ungovernable - Autonomous List; Die Unregierbaren – Autonome Liste	U/AL		Anti-fascism; Direct action	1989	2009	
	Union of Free Citizens; Bund freier Bürger	BFB	Manfred Brunner	National liberalism Right-wing populism	1994	2000	
	Union of Free Germany; Bund Freies Deutschland	BFD		Right-wing populism	1973	1977	
	United Socialist Party; Vereinigte Sozialistische Partei	VSP		Socialism	1986	2000	
	West German Women's Peace Movement; Westdeutsche Frauenfriedensbewegung	WFFB	Klara Marie Faßbinder	German reunification Anti-militarism; Pacifism	1952	1974	
	Woman's Party; Frauenpartei	Frauen	Sibylle Schücking-Helfferich	Feminism	1979	1989	
	Work for Bremen and Bremerhaven; Arbeit für Bremen und Bremerhaven	AFB		Centrism	1995	2004	
	Workers' Party of Germany; Partei der Arbeit Deutschlands	PdAD	Michael Koth	Juche; National Bolshevism	1995	1998	
	Workers' Party of Germany; Partei der Arbeit Deutschlands	PdAD	Simon Bärmann	Social democracy Progressive conservatism	2017	2020	
	Young Party; Junge Partei			Neo-Nazism; Neutrality	1951	1951/2	
	Youth and Development Party of Germany; Jugend- und Entwicklungspartei Deutschlands	JED	Till Müller, Lukas Ostermann	Youth interests Social liberalism Cannabis legalization	2017	2019	

=== Defunct parties in Allied-occupied Germany ===
Parties that were founded during the allied occupation and dissolved during or before 1950.

Logo	Name	Abbr.	Leader(s)	Ideology	Est.	Diss.	Note
	Democratic Party of Germany; Demokratische Parte Deutschlands	DPD	Theodor Heuss, Wilhelm Külz	Liberalism	1947	1948	Succeeded by FDP and LDPD
	Democratic People's Party; Demokratische Volkspartei	DVP	Theodor Heuss	Liberalism	1946	1948	Merged into FDP
	German Conservative Party - German Right Party; Deutsche Konservative Partei – Deutsche Rechtspartei	DKP-DRP	Wilhelm Jaeger (1947–1949)	National conservatism	1946	1950	Merged into DRP and DP
	German Conservative Party; Deutsche Konservative Partei	DKP	Eldor Borck, Otto Schmidt-Hannover	National conservatism	1946	1950	Merged into DKP-DRP
	German Reconstruction Party; Deutsche Aufbaupartei	DAP		Monarchism; German nationalism	1945	1946	Merged into DKP-DRP
	Lower Saxony State Party; Niedersächsische Landespartei	NLP		Regionalism; Christian conservatism Establishment of Lower Saxony	1945	1947	Merged into DP
	National Democratic Party; Nationaldemokratische Partei	NDP	Heinrich Leuchtgens	National conservatism	1945	1950	Only active in Hesse, merged into DRP
	Radical Social Freedom Party; Radikal-Soziale Freiheitspartei	RSF	Richard Batz, Peter Thielen	Freiwirtschaft; Border abolition Decentralization	1946	1950	Succeeded by HUMANWIRTSCHAFT

=== Parties in East Germany ===
Bloc	Logo	Name	Abbr.	Ideology	Note
Democratic Bloc and National Front		Socialist Unity Party of Germany; Sozialistische Einheitspartei Deutschland	SED	Stalinism; Communism; Marxism–Leninism	"Leading Role" per 1968 Constitution, succeeded by PDS
Democratic Bloc and National Front		Christian Democratic Union of Germany; Christlich-Demokratische Union Deutschlands	CDUD	Christian socialism Social conservatism	Merged into the CDU
Democratic Bloc and National Front		Liberal Democratic Party of Germany; Liberal-Demokratische Partei Deutschlands	LDPD	Liberal socialism	Merged into Association of Free Democrats (partly)
Democratic Bloc and National Front		Democratic Farmers' Party of Germany; Demokratische Bauernpartei Deutschlands	DBD	Agrarianism; Agrarian socialism	Merged into CDUD
Democratic Bloc and National Front		National Democratic Party of Germany; National-Demokratische Partei Deutschlands	NDPD	Conservatism; National conservatism Socialism	Merged into FDP

==== During transition (1989–90) ====
Alliance	Logo	Name	Abbr.	Ideology	Note
Alliance 90		Democracy Now; Demokratie Jetzt	DJ	Democratic socialism	Merged into Alliance 90/The Greens
Alliance 90		Initiative for Peace and Human Rights; Initiative für Frieden und Menschenrechte	IFM	Anti-Communism	Merged into Alliance 90/The Greens
Alliance 90		New Forum; Neues Forum	NF	Progressivism	Merged into Alliance 90/The Greens
Alliance for Germany		Christian Democratic Union of Germany; Christlich-Demokratische Union Deutschlands	CDUD	Christian democracy Social conservatism Anti-communism	Merged into the CDU
Alliance for Germany		Democratic Awakening; Demokratischer Aufbruch	DA	Liberal democracy Christian democracy	Merged into CDUD
Alliance for Germany		German Social Union; Deutsche Soziale Union	DSU	National conservatism Christian democracy Social conservatism	Still exists, see Minor parties
Association of Free Democrats		Liberal Democratic Party of Germany; Liberal-Demokratische Partei Deutschlands	LDPD	Liberalism	Merged into FDP
Association of Free Democrats		German Forum Party; Deutsche Forumpartei	DFP	Liberalism	Merged into FDP
Association of Free Democrats		Free Democratic Party; Freie Demokratische Partei	F.D.P.	Liberalism	Merged into FDP
		Democratic Farmers' Party of Germany; Demokratische Bauernpartei Deutschlands	DBD	Agrarianism	Merged into CDUD
		Green Party; Grüne Partei	Die Grünen	Green politics	Merged into Alliance 90/The Greens
		National Democratic Party of Germany; National-Demokratische Partei Deutschlands	NDPD	Centrism; National liberalism	Merged into FDP
		Social Democratic Party in the GDR; Sozialdemokratische Partei in der DDR	SPD	Social democracy	Merged into SPD
		Socialist Unity Party of Germany━Party of Democratic Socialism; Sozialistische Einheitspartei Deutschlands━Partei des Demokratischen Sozialismus	SED-PDS	Democratic socialism	Later renamed to PDS
		United Left; Vereinigte Linke	VL	Communism; Trotskyism; Socialism	

=== Parties in the Saar Protectorate ===
Name	Abbr.	Ideology	Active	Note
Christian People's Party of Saarland; Christliche Volkspartei des Saarlandes	CVP	Christian democracy Conservatism	1946–1959	Later merged with the CDU
Christian Social Union; Christlich-Soziale Union	CSU-S	Christian democracy Conservatism	1955–1959	Unofficial counterpart of the CSU
Communist Party of Saarland; Kommunistische Partei Saar	KP	Communism; Marxism–Leninism	1945–1957	Counterpart of the KPD
Democratic Party of Saarland; Demokratische Partei des Saarlandes	DPS	Conservative liberalism National conservatism	1946–1957	Later merged into the FDP
German Democratic Union; Deutsche Demokratische Union	DDU	Left-wing politics	1955–1968	Later merged with the DFU
German Social Democratic Party; Deutsche Sozialdemokratische Partei	DSP	Social democracy	1952–1956	Split from the SPS, later merged with the SPD
Social Democratic Party of Saarland; Sozialdemokratische Partei des Saarlandes	SPS	Social democracy Democratic Socialism	1946–1956	Counterpart of the SPD
Supranational European People's Party Saar; Übernationale Europäische Volkspartei saar	ÜEVPS		1955–?	

=== Parties in Weimar Republic ===
Logo	Name	Abbr.	Ideology	Political position	Active	Note
	Bavarian People's Party; Bayerische Volkspartei	BVP	Political Catholicism; Bavarian regionalism Conservatism; Constitutional monarchism	Right-wing	1918–1933	
	Centre Party; Deutsche Zentrumspartei	Zentrum	Christian democracy Political Catholicism	Centre to centre-right	1870–	
	Christian Social People's Service; Christlich-Sozialer Volksdienst	CSVD	Agrarainism; Conservatism; Political Protestantism	Centre-right	1929–1933	
	Communist Party of Germany; Kommunistische Partei Deutschlands	KPD	Communism; Marxism–Leninism	Far-left	1918–1956 (West); 1918–1946 (East)	Banned in West Germany, merged in East Germany
	Communist Party of Germany (Opposition); Kommunistische Partei Deutschlands (Opposition)	KPO	Communism; Luxemburgism	Left-wing, Far-left	1929–1939	
	Conservative People's Party; Konservative Volkspartei	KVP	Conservatism; Christian democracy	Right-wing	1930–1933	
	German Democratic Party; Deutsche Demokratische Partei	DDP	Social liberalism Progressivism	Centre-left	1918–1930	
	German National People's Party; Deutschnationale Volkspartei	DNVP	Monarchism; Proto-fascism; National conservatism German nationalism	Right-wing to Far-right	1918–1933	
	German People's Party; Deutsche Volkspartei	DVP	National liberalism Conservative liberalism Economic liberalism Constitutional monarchism	Centre-right	1918–1933	
	German Völkisch Freedom Party; Deutschvölkische Freiheitspartei	DVFP	German nationalism Völkisch movement	Far-right	1922–1925	
	German State Party; Deutsche Staatspartei	DStP	Liberalism; Nationalism; Corporatism	Centre-right	1930–1933	Short-lived merger of the DDP and Young German Order
	German Workers' Party; Deutsche Arbeiterpartei	DAP	Pan-Germanism; German nationalism Volksgemeinschaft	Far-right	1919–1920	Predecessor of the Nazi Party
	Independent Social Democratic Party of Germany; Unabhängige Sozialdemokratische Partei Deutschlands	USPD	Democratic socialism Centrist Marxism; Pacifism	Left-wing	1917–1931	
	National Socialist German Workers' Party; Nationalsozialistische Deutsche Arbeiterpartei	NSDAP	National Socialism	Far-right	1920–1945	Sole legal party of Nazi Germany from 1933 to 1945. Banned after World War II
	Socialist Workers' Party of Germany; Sozialistische Arbeiterpartei Deutschlands	SAPD	Democratic socialism Centrist Marxism	Far-left	1931–1945	

=== Parties founded before World War I ===
Name	Abbr.	Ideology	Active
Bavarian Peasants' League	BB	Agrarianism	1893–1933
Centre Party	Zentrum	Christian democracy	1870–
Christian Social Party	CSP	Traditionalist conservatism Christian democracy	1878–1918
Democratic Union	DV	Liberalism; Laïcité	1908–1918
Free Conservative Party	FKP	National conservatism	1867–1918
Free-minded People's Party	FVP	Liberalism; Progressivism; Parliamentarism; Laicism	1893–1910
Free-minded Union	FV	National liberalism	1893–1910
General German Workers' Association	ADAV	Social democracy Democratic socialism	1863–1875
German Conservative Party	DKP	Conservatism; Anti-liberalism; Anti-Catholicism	1876–1918
German Fatherland Party	DVLP	German nationalism Monarchism; Militarism; Volksgemeinschaft	1917–1918
German-Hanoverian Party	DHP	Conservatism; Federalism	1867–1933
German People's Party	DtVP	Social liberalism Federalism; Laïcité; Parliamentarism	1868–1910
German Progress Party	DFP	Liberalism; Federalism	1861–1884
German Free-minded Party	DFP	Liberalism; Progressivism; Parliamentarism; Laïcité	1884–1893
Independent Social Democratic Party of Germany	USPD	Democratic socialism Centrist Marxism; Pacifism	1917–1931
Lassallean General German Workers' Association	LADAV	Social democracy Lassallism	1867–1873
Liberal Union	LV	Liberalism; Parliamentarism; Classical liberalism Economic liberalism Conservative liberalism	1880–1884
National Liberal Party	NLP	National liberalism	1867–1918
National-Social Association	NSV	Christian socialism Social liberalism Nationalism	1896–1903
Progressive People's Party	FVP	Social liberalism Parliamentarism; Laïcité	1910–1918
Social Democratic Party of Germany	SPD	Social democracy	1875–present
Social Democratic Workers' Party of Germany	SDAP	Social democracy Marxist socialism	1869–1875

== See also ==
- Lists of political parties; categories by country and ideology.
- History of Germany since 1945
- Liberalism in Germany
