= Long arm of Ankara =

Soft power exerted by the Turkish government

In Dutch politics and media, the "long arm of Ankara" (Dutch: lange arm van Ankara) is a metaphorical reference to the soft power the government of Turkey allegedly exerts in various European countries (notably ones with significant Turkish minorities) by using European Turks as proxies; and in the same manner it denotes the influence the Turkish government holds or attempts to hold over the Turkish diaspora. As it is seen as a recent development that has occasionally been attributed to Turkish President Recep Tayyip Erdoğan, it is also less commonly known as "Erdogan's long arm" (lange arm van Erdogan).

== Name ==
The term long arm typically signifies a far-reaching influence of something, as is the case in the idiom "long arm of the law". Ankara is a metonym for the Grand National Assembly of Turkey (Turkish parliament) which is housed in the capital city of Ankara.

== International use ==
Internationally, some of the earliest mentions of the term that caught on were regarding Turkish President Erdogan calling for the prosecution of a German and a Dutch comedian over their satirical portrayals of him. Voice of America referred to it as the "long arm of the Turkish State".

Several outlets reported that the parliamentary faction run by two Turkish-Dutch people, DENK, had been accused of this due to controversy regarding their approach to Israel and anti-Semitism, the Armenian genocide, and the Turkish regime in general (especially after its arrest of Dutch journalist Ebru Umar).

Balkan Insight also used the term "long arm of Ankara" when referring to the Bulgarian party Democrats for Responsibility, Solidarity and Tolerance, who had been accused of having links to the Turkish government.

When the German police raided the homes of several Muslim imams suspected of spying for Turkey, Minister of Justice Heiko Maas stated: "If the suspicion that some Ditib imams were spying is confirmed, the organisation must be seen, at least in parts, as a long arm of the Turkish government.” The organisation has been called as such in the media. The Democratic Alliance for Diversity and Awakening, a party founded for the 2024 European Parliament election, was accused of being the "long arm of the AKP" or the "extended arm of Erdogan". The Alliance for Innovation and Justice, the Alliance of German Democrats, and the Union of International Democrats were also described as such.

The Equality and Justice Party was accused of being the "Turkey's arm in France" or the "extended arm of Erdogan". Nuance Party was described as the "long arm of Erdogan" and accused of having ties to the Turkish government. The Austrian ATIB Union had also being described as "extended arm of the Turkish government".

=== Anti-Gülenist purge ===
With the anti-Gülen purges in Turkey starting in 2016, some media have applied the term to the Turkish government's ability to arrest Turkish nationals living in other countries. On 30 March 2018, Ahval, an independent London-based media source founded by dissident Turkish journalists, reported that six Turkish nationals were detained in Kosovo and deported to Turkey. They were accused of being part of the Gülen movement. The move was condemned by Kosovar officials that included Prime Minister Ramush Haradinaj and President Hashim Thaci. According to author Nick Ashdown, Kosovo was especially susceptible to "Ankara’s long arm" because its rule of law is still "very shaky". Haaretz also interviewed the wives of Turkish Kosovars who were being detained in Turkey for alleged involvement, writing that "Erdogan's Long Arm" had "snatched over 100 alleged members of the Gülen movement from other countries in recent years."

In 2017, Politico wrote about a Turkish man being arrested in Tbilisi, Georgia, despite having already remained in the Caucasus for a decade. While most Western nations have refused Turkish demands for extradition, other countries like Malaysia and Saudi Arabia have generally complied. Several other countries shut down schools linked to the movement due to Turkish pressure, and Turkey has cancelled passports of people sympathetic with the Gülen movement, such as NBA player Enes Kanter. In a few cases, its government has been accused of abduction and torture.

== See also ==
- Turkish lobby in the United States
- Neo-Ottomanism
- Deep state in Turkey
- Free Palestine Party
- Fifth column
- Foreign electoral intervention
- Interventionism

Austria

- New Movement for the Future
- Social Austria of the Future

Netherlands

- Denk
