= Muslim Democratic Union =

Muslim Democratic Union Muslimische Demokratische Union
- Abbreviation: MDU
- Leader: Bilal Uwe Wilbert
- Founded: 2010
- Dissolved: March 2014
- Merged into: Alliance for Innovation and Justice
- Headquarters: Osnabrück
- Ideology: Islamism; Salafism
- Religion: Islam
- Colors: Red

Website
- www.mdu-niedersachsen.de (archived)

The Muslim Democratic Union (MDU; German: Muslimische Demokratische Union) was a minor Islamist political party in Germany. The party was founded during 2010 in Osnabrück and aimed to partake in the municipal elections the following year. It was primarily active in Lower Saxony, in particular Osnabrück, but also had members in North Rhine-Westphalia. The party was categorized as extremist and Salafist by the Office for the Protection of the Constitution in Lower Saxony.

The MDU merged into the Alliance for Innovation and Justice in March 2014.

== Ideology and assessments ==
The Office for the Protection of the Constitution in Lower Saxony stated that the party has "anti-constitutional Islamist efforts" in August 2012. Its head at the time, Hans-Werner Wargel, claimed that the MDU wanted to "fight democracy through the means of democracy". The office's report cited, among other things, passages on the MDU's website where the party condemned democracy as "Polytheistic" and called it Islamophobic. The party also posted a fatwa by the salafist Muhammad Al-Munajjid on their website which declared that the participation in democracy is dangerous and should be condemned as un-Islamic.

Several members of the party, particularly in the Delmenhorst section, belonged to the Özoguz family, which runs the Islamist muslim-markt.de website, which was under surveillance of the Office for the Protection of the Constitution until 1999. The head of the Delmenhorst section, Hassan Mohsen, dismissed the Office's assessments as a way to discredit the MDU and claimed that the party had no connections to Salafists.

Bilal Uwe Wilbert, the leader of the MDU, participated in the Quds Day 2013 in Berlin as a speaker where he condemned Israel.

== Elections ==
The first election the MDU ran in was the 2011 municipal election in Osnabrück where it received 1,401 votes (0.8%).

The MDU participated in the 2013 Lower Saxon state election, where it only ran in the two Osnabrück constituencies and received 210 votes (0.0%).

== See also ==
- Alliance for Innovation and Justice
- Islam in Germany
- Political Islam
