= DAVA =

DAVA may refer to:

== Biology, chemistry, and medicine ==
- Vindesine, a semisynthetic vinca alkaloid

== Political parties ==
- Democratic Alliance for Diversity and Awakening, German political party
