= Democratic Party of Germany (disambiguation) =

Democratic Party of Germany (Demokratische Partei Deutschlands, DPD), was a German liberal party 1947–1948 and forerunner of the Free Democratic Party (FDP).

Democratic Party of Germany may also refer to:

- Democratic Party of Germany (1995), DPD, 1995–2002
- Democratic Party of Germany (2009), DPD, 2009–2012

== See also ==
- German Democratic Party, DDP, 1918–1930
- German Democratic Party (2004), ddp, 2004–2015
