= Revolutionary Workers' Party (Trotskyist) =

- Founded: 1962
- Split from: Revolutionary Socialist League
- Newspaper: Red Flag
- Ideology: Posadism

There was also a Revolutionary Workers' Party (Trotskyist) in Peru.

The Revolutionary Workers' Party (Trotskyist) was a socialist political party in Britain, based in Birmingham.

== History ==
It was founded in 1963 by members of the Revolutionary Socialist League who supported the Fourth International of J. Posadas when it split from the International Secretariat of the Fourth International. The group began working on the European Marxist Review and publishing Red Flag. It later supported Sinn Féin, the Black Panther Party and also worked within Labour Party Young Socialists.

In the early 1970s, the party suffered a major split, with supporters of Dave Douglass leaving to form the Socialist Union (Internationalist).

The remainder of the party remained loyal to Posadas' line; it continued with a very low level of activity after his death in 1981, and continued to publish Red Flag intermittently until the year 2000.

== Posadism ==
The organisation adhered to Posadism, the theories of Argentine Trotskyist, J. Posadas. He was the author of a number of works with an unconventional slant; he tried to create a synthesis of Trotskyism and Ufology. His most prominent thesis from this perspective was Flying saucers, the process of matter and energy, science, the revolutionary and working-class struggle and the socialist future of mankind (1968). Posadists believed that extra-terrestrials visiting earth in flying saucers must come from a socially and scientifically advanced civilisation to master inter-planetary travel and that the working-class should welcome the alien invaders as their liberators.
