= Lobbyists for Children =

Lobbyists for Children Lobbyisten für Kinder
- Abbreviation: LfK
- Leader: Johanna Nelkner
- Founded: March 2021
- Membership: 120
- Ideology: Children's rights
- Political position: Single-issue
- Bundestag: 0 / 709
- Bundesrat: 0 / 69
- State Parliaments: 0 / 1,884
- European Parliament: 0 / 96

Website
- www.lobbyistenfuerkinder.de

The Lobbyists for Children (German: Lobbyisten für Kinder) is a minor political party in Germany.

== History ==
The party was founded in March 2021 in protest of the COVID-19 prevention policies in Germany, which the party claimed did not fairly consider the interests of children.

The party participated in the 2021 German federal election, receiving 9,189 votes, and no representation in parliament. Later, the party would participate in the 2022 North Rhine-Westphalia state election, winning 0.1% of the vote.

== Ideology ==
The party campaigns on the rights of children, poverty reduction and education. They have stated they intend to base German policy off of the United Nations Convention on the Rights of the Child. The party has also made calls to lower the voting age to 14.
