= Democratic Gay/Lesbian Party - The People's Party =

Democratic Gay/Lesbian Party - The People's Party Demokratische Schwul / Lesbische Partei - Die Bürgerpartei
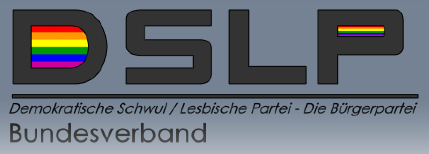
- Abbreviation: DSLP
- Leader: Thomas Mosmann
- Founded: 2013
- Dissolved: ca. 2016
- Headquarters: Villingen-Schwenningen
- Ideology: LGBT rights Before 2014: Homonationalism; Anti-Islam
- Colors: Orange

Website
- www.dslp-bundesverband.net (archived)

The Democratic Gay/Lesbian Party - The People's Party (German: Demokratische Schwul / Lesbische Partei - Die Bürgerpartei) short-form: DSLP was a minor pro-LGBT political party in Germany. It was founded by former self-proclaimed NPD-sympathizer Thomas Mosmann.

== Program ==
The 2013 party program reportedly advocated for the reintroduction of border controls, assimilation of immigrants, a crackdown on drug possession as well as crime, the deportation of criminal foreigners, animal rights, a universal basic income, the recognition of same-sex marriage, LGBT anti-discrimination legislation, a limit on the building of new mosques, stopping the development of parallel societies, and a stop to all reparations payments for World War 2.

The DSLP adopted a new party program in 2014 which removed all nationalist sentiments and laid a bigger focus on equality, after the adoption of which Thomas Mosmann stepped down from all offices in the party.
