= New National Party (Germany) =

New National Party Neue Nationale Partei
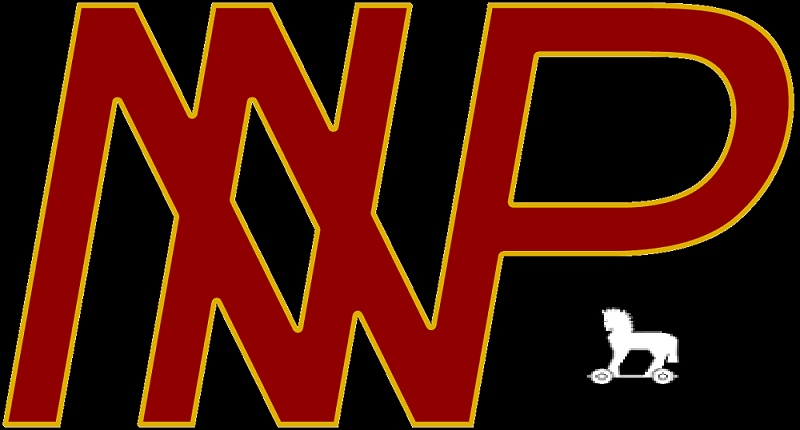
- Abbreviation: NNP
- Leader: Jens Tholen
- Founded: October 23, 2014
- Dissolved: >2016
- Headquarters: Am Lindenufer 17, 13597 Berlin
- Ideology: Civic nationalism Social liberalism

Website
- www.nnp.de.com

The New National Party (German: Neue Nationale Partei), short-form: NNP, was a minor political party in Germany based in Berlin.

== History ==
The NNP was founded on 23. October 2014 in Berlin. The party no longer showed activity after 2016 and was taken from lists of the Federal Returning Officer in late 2020.

== Ideology ==
In its party program, the NNP started that Germany is a multi-ethnic state and that the party seeks to reclaim the term "nation" from right-wingers through a civic and global understanding of nationhood. It sought to make immigration as easy as possible while recognizing every peaceful citizen, regardless of ethnicity, religion, or ancestry; as a welcome addition to the nation. As an end goal in that regard, the party stated that it wished to create a global community where national borders take on no more than ceremonial character, similar to borders in federal systems, which anyone can cross at any time without even noticing it.

The party defined itself as social and liberal as well as positioning itself in favour of the social market economy while also advocating for strong regulations and state intervention in the economy.

In a 2016 Facebook post, the party took an opposing stance to the gender star.
