= Foreign electoral intervention =

Interventions by foreign governments in elections

Foreign electoral interventions (FEI) are attempts by a government to influence the elections of another country. Common methods include backing a preferred party or candidate, harming the electoral chances of another party or candidate, elevating the power or voice of disruptive candidates, or exacerbating overall polarization through amplifying or disseminating misinformation or disinformation.

Unlike other forms of foreign intervention, such as through military force or economic coercion, FEI aims to achieve a political outcome in the targeted country by affecting how its citizens vote, rather than by directly imposing regime change (such as backing or initiating a coup). However, some methods of FEI, such as manipulating voter registration records, similarly violate the target country's sovereignty.

Consequently, some scholars and organizations, such as the United States National Intelligence Council, distinguish between methods of FEI that constitute interference—in that they clearly violate the domestic laws of the target state, such as disrupting vote counting, providing illicit funds to a party or candidate, or launching cyberattacks on a political campaign—and influence, which alter incentives or beliefs of voters through evidently legal means, such as public threats or endorsements by foreign officials, offering preferential trade terms, or revealing legally held but damaging information about a party or candidate.

Although foreign electoral interventions in all forms are categorically initiated and conducted by a foreign power (typically a government), they almost always require the consent, cooperation, or assistance of a domestic actor, such as a political party, candidate, media member, or other influential public figure.

== Intervention measurements ==
Theoretical and empirical research on the effect of foreign electoral intervention had been characterized as weak overall as late as 2011; however, since then a number of such studies have been conducted.

According to Dov H. Levin's 2020 book Meddling in the Ballot Box: The Causes and Effects of Partisan Electoral Interventions, the United States intervened in the largest number of foreign elections between 1946 and 2000. A previous 2018 study by Levin found that foreign electoral interventions determined the identity of the winner in "many cases". The study also found suggestive evidence that such interventions increased the risk of democratic breakdown in the targeted states.

Among 938 "competitive national level executive elections" examined by Levin from 1946 to 2000, (Note: These covered the period between 1946 and 2000, and included 148 countries, all with populations above 100,000.) the United States intervened in 81 foreign elections, while the Soviet Union or Russia intervened in 36 foreign elections. Combining these figures, the U.S. and Russia (including the Soviet Union) thus intervened in 117 of 938 competitive elections during this period—about one in nine—with the majority of those interventions (some 68%) being through covert, rather than overt, actions.

Also "on average, an electoral intervention in favor of one side contesting the election will increase its vote share by about 3 percent," an effect large enough to have potentially changed the results in seven out of 14 U.S. presidential elections occurring after 1960. (Note: This is, as the author points out, "Assuming, of course, a similar shift in the relevant swing states and, accordingly, the electoral college.") (Note: Others, such as Corstange and Marinov, Miller, and Gustafson have argued that foreign electoral intervention is likely to have the opposite effect.)

In contrast, a 2019 study by Lührmann et al. at the Varieties of Democracy Institute in Sweden summarized reports from each country to say that in 2018 the most intense interventions, by means of false information on key political issues, were by China in Taiwan and by Russia in Latvia; the next highest levels were in Bahrain, Qatar and Hungary; the lowest levels were in Trinidad and Tobago, Switzerland and Uruguay.

== Intervention types ==
In a 2012 study, Corstange and Marinov theorized that there are two types of foreign intervention: partisan intervention, where the foreign power takes a stance on its support for one side, and process intervention, where the foreign power seeks "to support the rules of democratic contestation, irrespective of who wins". Their results from 1,703 participants found that partisan interventions had a polarizing effect on political and foreign relations views, with the side favored by the external power more likely to favor improvements in relations between the two, and having the converse effect for those opposed by the power.

In 2018, Jonathan Godinez further elaborated on Corstange and Marinov's theory by proposing that interventions can be specified as globally-motivated intervention, where "a country intervenes in the election of another country for the interests, betterment, or well-being of the international audience," and self-motivated intervention, where "a country intervenes in the election of another country to further the interests, betterment, or well-being of themselves."

Godinez further theorized that the vested interest of an intervening country can be identified by examining a "threefold methodology": the tactics of intervention, stated motivation, and the magnitude of the intervention.

Also in 2012, Shulman and Bloom theorized a number of distinct factors affecting the results of foreign interference:

- Agents of interference: each with a descending effect on resentment caused by their intervention, these being nations, international organizations, non-governmental organizations, and finally individuals.
- Partisanship of interference: whether foreign actors intervene to affect institutions and process broadly, or intervene primarily to favor one side in a contest
- Salience of interference: consisting of two elements. First, "how obvious and well-known is the interference", and second, "how clear and understandable is the intervention?"

Additionally, they theorized that national similarities between the foreign and domestic powers would decrease resentment, and may even render the interference welcome. In cases where national autonomy are of primary concern to the electorate, they predicted a diminished effect of the similarity or dissimilarity of the two powers on resentment. Conversely, they predicted that in cases where national identity was a primary concern, the importance of similarity or dissimilarity would have a greater impact.

== See also ==
- Artificial intelligence and elections - use of AI to influence elections.
- Caesaropapism – intervention of monarchs in religious affairs like the investiture of clergy.
- Foreign exploitation of American race relations
- Long arm of Ankara
- October surprise
- Russian involvement in regime change
  - Internet Research Agency – Russian company, funded by Russian businessman Yevgeny Prigozhin, was implicated in interference in several elections in Europe and North America.
  - Fancy Bear, another Russian conduit for cyberwarfare implicated in interference in several elections in Europe and North America.
  - Soviet involvement in regime change
- State-sponsored Internet propaganda
- United Kingdom
  - Cambridge Analytica – British company worked in more than 200 elections around the world, including in Nigeria, the Czech Republic and Argentina.
  - Murchison letter regarding inadvertent British influence on the 1888 U.S. presidential election
- United States involvement in regime change
  - CIA influence on public opinion
  - United States involvement in regime change in Latin America
- Donald Trump 2024 presidential campaign
