= Jugend- und Entwicklungspartei Deutschlands =

Youth and Development Party of Germany Jugend- und Entwicklungspartei Deutschlands
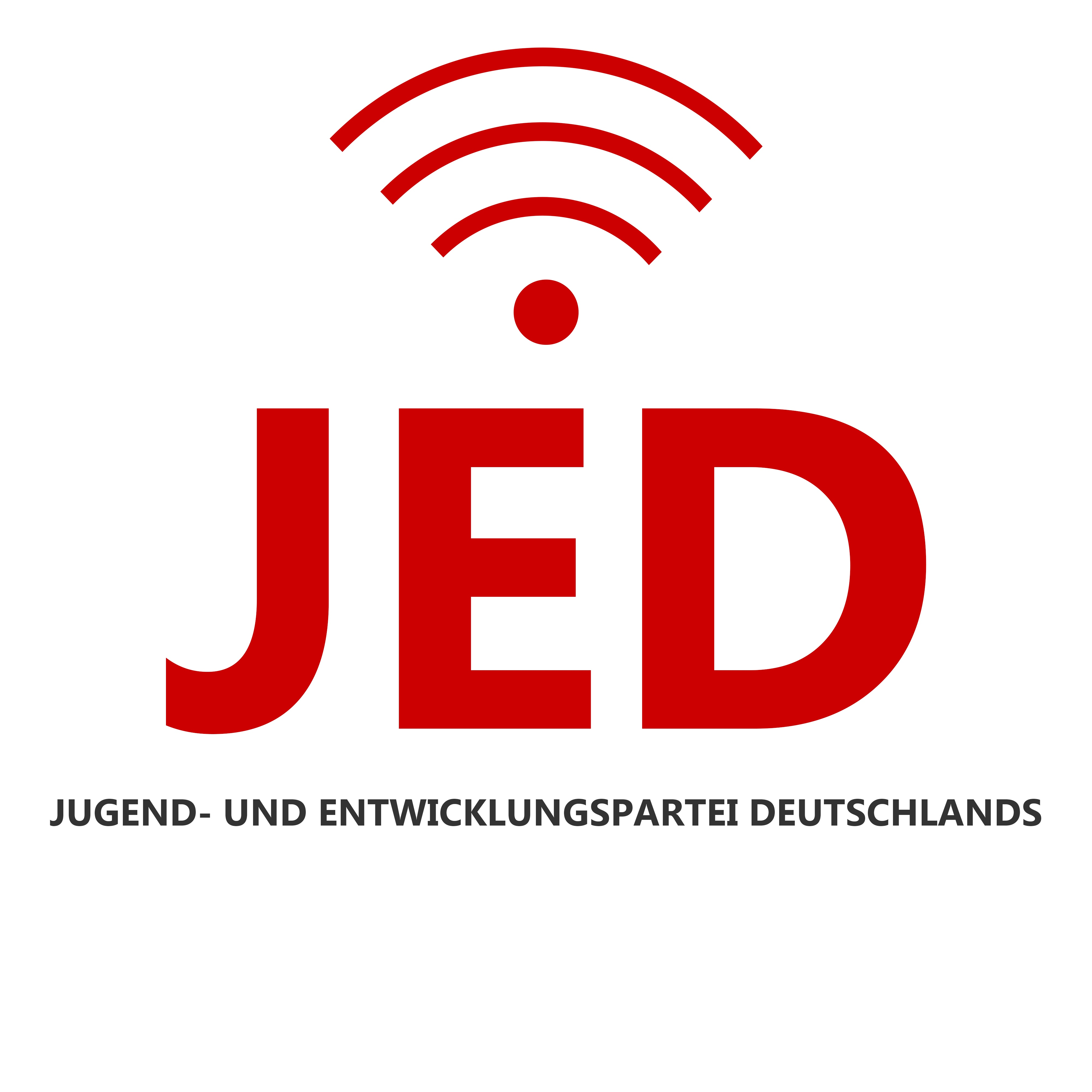
- Abbreviation: JED
- Leader: Till Müller, Lukas Ostermann
- Founded: February 17, 2017
- Dissolved: November 9, 2019
- Headquarters: Office Center Rheine, Landersumer Weg 40, 48431 Rheine
- Membership: 85
- Ideology: Youth interests Social liberalism Cannabis legalization
- Slogan: New beginning, now! Neustart, jetzt!

Website
- http://jed-bund.de/

The Youth and Development Party of Germany (German: Jugend- und Entwicklungspartei Deutschlands) short-form: JED, was a minor political party in Germany. The party primarily focused on the interests of teenagers and young adults.

== History ==
The party was founded in 2017 by roughly 35 pupils from the Emsland Gymnasium in Rheine. The party was founded due to the founders viewing all other parties as "unelectable", highlighting the average age of politicians in the major political parties.

The JED was dissolved in November 2019.

== Program ==
The JED wanted more funding for schools, a faster implementation of new media in the classroom, as well as a return to the G9 policy for gymnasiums. The party also wanted to raise HARZ IV and legalize the authorized distribution of recreational cannabis.

One of the co-founders of the party proposed a voting age of 14 in a 2019 interview.

== Elections ==
The JED only ever participated in the 2017 North Rhine-Westphalia state election, where it received 7,054 votes (0.1%). It was also recognized as a political party for the 2017 federal election but did not contest.

=== State elections ===
| Year | NW |
|---|---|
| 2017 | 0.1% (7,054) |

== See also ==
- Cannabis in Germany
- List of political parties in Germany
- PETO
- Youth activism
- Youth empowerment
- Youth politics
- Youth rights
- Youth voice
