= Kommunistische Partei =

Kommunistische Partei may refer to:

- Kommunistische Partei Deutschlands (Communist Party of Germany)
- Kommunistische Partei Deutschlands/Marxisten-Leninisten (Communist Party of Germany/Marxists–Leninists)
- Kommunistische Partei Deutschlands - Roter Morgen (Communist Party of Germany (Roter Morgen))
- Kommunistische Partei Österreichs (Communist Party of Austria)
- Kommunistische Partei (Schweiz) (Communist Party (Switzerland))

== See also ==
- Kommunistische Partij van Belgie (Communist Party of Belgium)
