= Social People's Party (Germany) =

Social People's Party Soziale Volkspartei
- Abbreviation: SVP
- Leader: Ronny Grubert
- Founded: 1999
- Dissolved: 1999
- Split from: NPD
- Headquarters: Rostock
- Membership (1999): ca. 50
- Ideology: Neo-Nazism; Ultranationalism; Militancy

The Social People's Party (German: Soziale Volkspartei) short-form: SVP, was a short-lived minor militant Neo-Nazi party in Germany. The SVP split from the Rostock section of the National Democratic Party of Germany after the NPD started to reorientate itself in a more National Bolshevik direction, which around half of the Rostock sector disapproved of. Both this ideological disagreement, as well as a power struggle between the later founding members of the SVP and the newly elected leadership of the NPD, following its defeat in the 1998 Mecklenburg-Vorpommern state election, culminated in the SVP splitting off.

The SVP was led by Ronny Grubert, an agent for the Federal Office for the Protection of the Constitution and high-ranking NPD politician in Mecklenburg-Vorpommern, who deliberately contributed to the divide in the east German NPD that would later cause the SVP to split off under his leadership. Grubert's involvement with the BfV was also used to explain the party's lack of further activity and quick dissolution in the same year. Another BfV agent involved in the split of the SVP from the NPD was Michael Grube.

Members of the SVP were involved in a xenophobic arson attack on a Pizzeria in Grevesmühlen in March 1999, which lead some to categorize the party as militant.
