= Social People's Party of Germany =

Defunct minor German political party

Social People's Party of Germany Soziale Volkspartei Deutschlands
- Abbreviation: SVD
- Leader: Wolfgang Staschen
- Founded: 18 August 1984; 42 years ago
- Dissolved: unknown
- Membership (1984): ~200
- Ideology: Social democracy Anti-Immigration

The Social People's Party of Germany (German: Soziale Volkspartei Deutschlands) short-form: SVD, was a minor German political party which split off from the SPD in 1984. It was led by Wolfgang Staschen, a former local SPD leader in West Berlin.

The SVD was founded on 18 August, 1984 in the Hotel Berlin on Lützowplatz. The event was attended by roughly 200 people, most of which were former members of the SPD. The main goals of the party were to prevent a perceived left-shift of the SPD as well as its ability to form a Red-Green coalition by establishing a new fifth major political party in Germany. The SVD only ever participated in the 1985 West Berlin state election, where it received 1,406 votes (0.1%). The dissolution date of the party is unknown, however it likely dissolved not shortly after its electoral defeat.
