= David John Douglass =

British trade unionist

David John Douglass, sometimes known as Dave or "Danny the Red", is a political activist in Tyneside and Yorkshire. He is a member of the IWW, the NUM and Class War, and was formerly in the Revolutionary Workers' Party (Trotskyist) and the Socialist Union (Internationalist), of which he was a leading member. He is a regular contributor to the Weekly Worker, the newspaper of the Communist Party of Great Britain (Provisional Central Committee). He has also written Pit Talk in County Durham (1973), a book about the dialect Pitmatic.

He holds an MA in Industrial Relations and Law.

== Work history ==
He worked as a coalminer in the coalfields of Durham and South Yorkshire, and was NUM Branch Delegate for Hatfield Colliery from 1979. He appears in the documentary The Miner's Campaign Tapes to discuss the role of the popular media in the strike of 1984–85. In 1994–95 he was Branch Secretary at Hatfield Main, but after the pit was privatised the NUM no longer had any recognition there.

From 1994 to 2006 he helped to run the Miners Community Advice Centre in Stainforth.

In 1999, Douglass appeared on the BBC Two television series Living with the Enemy, "in which ideological enemies spend a week in each other's company," at the home of Lord Rowallan of Kilmarnock.

He worked at the National Coal Mining Museum for England as a researcher on the exhibition Strike, Not the End of It, and subsequently published a book with the same title on the history of industrial disputes in British mining.

The three volumes of his autobiography, Geordies — Wa Mental, The Wheel's Still in Spin and Ghost Dancers, were published by Christie Books between 2008 and 2010.

== Published works ==
- Pit Life in County Durham, History Workshop, 1972
- Pit Talk in County Durham, History Workshop, 1973
- A Miner's Life (with Joel Krieger), Law Book Co Australasia, 1983
- Tell Us Lies About The Miners, DAM, 1985
- Come And Wet This Truncheon, DAM/Canary Press, 1986
- A Year Of Our Lives, Hooligan Press, 1986
- Pit Sense versus the State: a history of militant miners in the Doncaster area, Phoenix Press, year unknown ISBN 0-948984-26-0
- All Power to the Imagination!, Class War Federation, 1999 ISBN 0-9537347-0-6
- Strike, Not the End of the Story: Reflections on the Major Coal Mining Strikes in Britain, National Coal Mining Museum for England Publications 4, Overton, 2005, ISBN 187292509X
- Geordies — Wa Mental, Christie Books, 2008 ISBN 978-1-873976-34-0
- The Wheel's Still in Spin, Christie Books, 2009 ISBN 978-1-873976-36-4
- Ghost Dancers, Christie Books, 2010 ISBN 978-1-873976-40-1
