= Citizens for Mecklenburg-Vorpommern =

Citizens for Mecklenburg-Vorpommern Bürger für Mecklenburg-Vorpommern
- Leader: Michael Bertram
- Founded: 25 September 2017 (faction)
- Registered: 20 January 2018 (party)
- Dissolved: 9 December 2018
- Split from: Alternative for Germany
- Merged into: Free Voters (majority)
- Ideology: Conservatism; Regionalism
- Political position: Centre-right
- National affiliation: Free Voters

Website
- bmv-partei.de

Citizens for Mecklenburg-Western Pomerania (German: Bürger für Mecklenburg-Vorpommern, BMV) was a regionalist political party in Germany based in Mecklenburg-Western Pomerania. They were founded from a split in the faction of the Alternative for Germany (AfD) party in the state parliament. They had described themselves as a "conservative & regional party" and had compared themselves to the Christian Social Union (CSU) in Bavaria. They had four members of the state parliament before merging into the Free Voters in December 2018, although by October 2019, two of the MPs had joined the Christian Democratic Union, while one had rejoined the AfD and one had decided to sit as an independent.
