= PETO =

German political party

PETO – The young alternative PETO – Die junge Alternative
- Leader: Lydia Hannawald
- Deputy Leader: Malte Franke
- Founded: 1998
- Headquarters: Monheim am Rhein
- Membership (2013): Approx 400

Website
- www.peto.de

PETO – Die junge Alternative (Shorter name: PETO, lat.: "I postulate") is one of the first youth parties in Germany. Established in 1999, the political party is based in Monheim am Rhein in North Rhine-Westphalia.

== 2014 Town Council and Mayoral Elections - Monheim am Rhein ==
PETO made overwhelming gains in the Town Council and Mayoral elections in 2014. Daniel Zimmermann (the incumbent mayor of Monheim) won with 94.64% of the vote, against Manfred Poell (Bundnis 90/Grüne - 5.36%). In the Town Council elections, PETO received 65,64% of the vote, compared with 17.80% for Angela Merkel's Christian Democrats (CDU/CSU).

== See also ==
- Monheim am Rhein
- List of political parties in Germany
- Jugend- und Entwicklungspartei Deutschlands
