= Paul Schulz (ufologist) =

German political theorist (1925–2013)

Personal details
- Born: 8 July 1925 Berlin, Weimar Republic
- Died: 25 February 2013 Berlin, Germany
- Resting place: St. Thomas-Friedhof, Neukölln, Berlin
- Party: Posadist Communist Party
- Spouse: Eva-Marie Wanke
- Profession: Metallurgist

Paul Schulz (8 July 1925 – 25 February 2013) was a German Posadist political theorist and ufologist who is credited with strong infusion of esotericism into Posadist thought. Besides publishing his own works on esoteric Posadism, including his own political newspaper Gesellschaftsreform jetzt! (Social Reform Now!), he also translated many works of Juan Posadas into the German language. Schulz founded and led the unsuccessful German Posadist Communist Party.

== Biography ==
Schulz was born to Jewish parents in Berlin, Weimar Germany on 8 July 1925. The marriage of his parents would later be described as "disastrous" from the start, which would shape Schulz. When he was 13 years old, Schulz and his parents fled to Argentina to escape persecution under the Nazi regime. In Argentina, Schulz would later come to know the Trotskyist revolutionary Juan Posadas, with whom he claimed to feel a deep connection, and viewed as "a truly great man". Posadas would reportedly give his life meaning, rescuing him from loneliness and depression.

Schulz became a militant for the Workers' Party and the Grupo Cuarta Internacional (GCI) under Posadas. From 1959 to 1961, Schulz was, along with two other militants, sent to the Moroccan city of Kentira by Posadas in order aid Michel Pablo, who had transformed a citrus plantation into a secret munitions factory built to supply the National Liberation Front during the Algerian national liberation struggle against France.

Schulz returned to West Germany at the end of 1969, where he would temporarily settle in Frankfurt and work for Opel as a metallurgist. During this time, Schulz was involved in union activities. After his retirement, Schulz settled in Treptow, East Berlin, where he rented an apartment with his spouse, Eva-Marie Wanke. In his apartment, Schulz set up a printing shop and bookbindery, where he would personally write, print, and bind books, magazines, and brochures which he would try to sell on markets in Berlin. Schulz and his spouse moved to Neukölln in 2007.

Schulz joined the German section of the Fourth International–Posadist (German: Deutsche Sektion der IV. Internationale Trotzkisten-Posadisten), a small group of about 30 members in Frankfurt, the spokesperson of which was the former KPD member Harald Grünberg. The group split up after the death of Posadas in May 1981. Grünberg later worked for The Left Party.PDS.

Posadas's death in 1981 reportedly caused the life of Schulz to fall apart as he would lose basic social skills and his marriage would "disintegrate", causing his renewed fall into depression. In 1983, at the age of 58, Schulz reported to experience an awakening, starting to hear the voices of aliens and writing of a "sudden change" in his personality as well as outlook upon his return from Latin America earlier that year. Schulz died of a lung infection on 25 February 2013 at the age of 87. He was buried at St. Thomas Friedhof in Neukölln on 8 March 2013.

== Beliefs ==
Upon his 1983 "awakening", Schulz started looking towards Billy Meier's works to explain his experiences. Meier taught that an advanced and benevolent alien race, known as the Plejorans, would send transmissions to a few hundred humans capable of understanding and disseminating their messages. Schulz, having had experiences of hearing voices, believed himself to be part of said group. In his 2001 book Die offizielle Kontaktaufnahme einer außerirdischen Zivilisation mit uns Erdlingen steht nahe bevor, Schulz summarized the Plejoran's message. According to him, there are 40,353,607 humanoid races in the universe, all living together in peace, with 7.5 million existing in the Milky Way alone. Humans, according to him, were bred as warriors for an ancient conflict in the Sirius constellation that ended a long time ago, and that they were genetically modified savages said to have a lifetime ten times shorter than their creators. Earth, according to Schulz, was a "war planet", being the only planet with so many wars in the last 10,000 years.

Schulz believed his life to have been structured into three "Cosmic Phases" that would prepare him to help Meier bring humanity into cosmic self-consciousness. The first phase was the rise of Hitler, which would lead to him becoming an anti-fascist and moving to Argentina. The second phase was him becoming a militant for the only socialist who understood that "life on Earth will have to link up with the Cosmos in order to continue", namely Posadas. The "third" phase was his awakening, after which he committed himself to transmitting the knowledge of a higher power. In his writings, Schulz combined his esoteric beliefs with Posadist and Marxist analysis. One of the primary drivers behind Schulz's writings and beliefs, was the idea that humanity is facing an existential threat of self-annihilation that is to be prevented at all costs. Schulz believed in a form of reincarnation; he believed Maarten Dillinger, a supposed influence on Billy Meier, to have been an incarnation of Karl Marx. To promote his beliefs, Schulz founded the Posadist Communist Party in Germany.

== Influence ==
Schulz, along with Dante Minazzoli, is largely credited with the strong infusion of esotericism into Posadist thought, morphing it into the "cartoonish" representation Posadism is largely known for today. While Minazzoli and Schulz were likely never in contact, their conclusions were similar, Schulz however differed in that his assertions were fully in the realm of divine revelation, and were more akin to religious teachings than Marxist ones. The article "Trots in Space" in the Fortean Times by Matthew Salusbury published in 2004, interviewed Schulz as one of its main sources in the first English-language retrospect of the Posadist movement from a non-Trotskyist source. Billy Meier and his organization never reciprocated Schulz's frequent letters and requests. Werner Grundmann, a friend of Schulz, was strongly influenced by Schulz's teachings and vowed to continue Schulz's work after his death.

=== Publishing work ===
Schulz published the bi-monthly magazine Gesellschaftsreform jetzt! (Social Reform Now!) from 1990 to 2005, on which he reportedly worked completely alone. In addition to his own works, Schulz also published German translations of the works of Juan Posadas. Schulz published all his works and translations in through his own publishing house, Edition Wissenschaft, Kultur und Politik.

== Selected publications ==
- Der Ursprung unserer Welt und Menschheit außerirdische Intelligenzen informieren uns, 1995
- Woher kommen wir? Wohin gehen wir?: und währenddessen: Wie verhindern wir die Selbstzerstörung unserer Welt und Menschheit?, 1997, ISBN 9783926426413
- Die offizielle Kontaktaufnahme einer außerirdischen Zivilisation mit uns Erdlingen steht nahe bevor, 2001
