= Arminius – Association of the German People =

Arminius – Association of the German People Arminius – Bund des deutschen Volkes
- Abbreviation: ARMINIUS-Bund
- Leader: Johann Thießen
- Founded: 23 March 2013
- Split from: NPD
- Headquarters: Wiehl
- Newspaper: Die Russlanddeutschen Konservativen (de facto)
- Membership (2016): c. 40
- Ideology: Russia German interests German nationalism Ethnopluralism; Neo-Nazism
- Political position: Far-right
- Colors: Red

Party flag

Website
- http://www.arminius-bund.de (archived)

Arminius – Association of the German People (German: ARMINIUS-Bund des deutschen Volkes) short-form: ARMINIUS-Bund is a minor far-right political party in Germany. The party sees itself as a conservative political arm for the Russia Germans.

== History ==
ARMINIUS-Bund and its North Rhine-Westphalian sector were founded on 23 March 2013 by Johann Thießen in the city of Wiehl. The party emerged from a group known as the "Working group of Russia Germans in the NPD". Two other state sectors were founded in Baden-Württemberg and Rhineland-Palatinate on 15 June 2013 and 8 November 2014 respectively. The party maintains close links to the group and publication Die Russlanddeutschen Konservativen with which the party has a large personnel overlap. It also cooperates with the European Action.

Online activity of the party has slowed down since 2020, with its website being unavailable since 2019.

== Ideology ==
The party's manifesto describes a völkish, nationalist, and ethnopluralist ideology; in part adopting ideas from the 25-Point-Program of the former Nazi Party.

ARMINIUS-Bund calls for the adoption of a new constitution as per Art. 146 GG and advocates for a self-sufficient agrarian economy, placing large importance on the welfare and culture of the German people. The party also calls for the direct election of the federal president, simplification of the tax system, financial support for mothers, a stop to immigration, and an energy alliance with Russia. It also proposes a new retirement system in which the retirement age is lowered by one year for every child one has. The party believes that abortion is murder and should be treated as such in most cases.

== Elections ==
=== State elections ===
In the 2016 Baden-Württemberg state election, ARMINIUS-Bund ran in the constituency of Pforzheim and received 49 votes (0.1%).

Year	BW	
Year	Votes	%
2016	49	0.1

=== Local elections ===
ARMINIUS-Bund participated in the 2014 Düren city council election and the 2014 Oberbergischer Kreis district election. On 13 February 2016, in the lead-up to the Düren municipal elections, ARMINIUS-Bund hosted an event under the motto "Protest against the rape of German women. Stop immigration, close borders!".

Year	Düren		Pforzheim		OBK	
Year	Votes	%	Votes	%	Votes	%
2014	72	0.25	4,234	0.41	60	0.05

== See also ==
- Russia Germans
- List of political parties in Germany
- National Democratic Party of Germany
- Far-right politics in Germany (1945–present)
