= Democratic Socialists (Germany) =

German political party

Democratic Socialists (German: Demokratische Sozialisten, DS) was a minor political party in Germany active during the 1980s which positioned itself as the "socialist alternative" to the Social Democratic Party of Germany (SPD). The party was founded in 1982 as the Democratic Socialist Forum (Forum Demokratische Sozialisten).
