= J. Posadas =

Italian-Argentine Trotskyist (1912–1981)

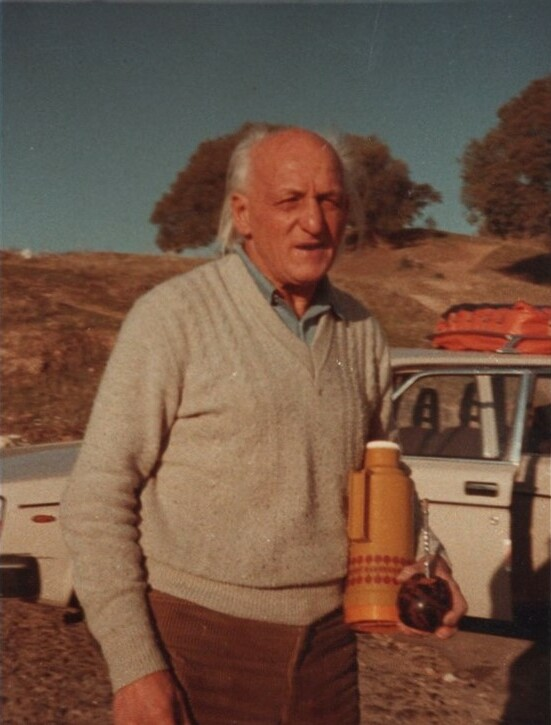
- Posadas in 1980
- Born: January 20, 1912; Argentina
- Died: May 14, 1981 (aged 69); Rome, Italy

Philosophical work
- Main interests: Politics, economics, law
- Notable ideas: Posadism

Homero Rómulo Cristalli Frasnelli (January 20, 1912 – May 14, 1981), better known under the pseudonym J. Posadas or sometimes Juan Posadas (Spanish: [ˈxwan poˈsaðas]), was an Argentine Trotskyist whose personal vision is usually described as Posadism. Originally a collective pen name of the leadership of the Grupo Cuarta Internacional (GCI) in Argentina in the 1940s, it was also used by Dante Minazzoli initially.

== Early life ==
Born in Argentina to Italian immigrants from the Southern town of Matera, Cristalli grew up in intense poverty in Buenos Aires with at least nine siblings. After the death of his mother, he and his brothers and sisters had to beg from neighbours and do odd jobs for pennies in order to survive. Malnourishment left him with permanent health problems but also influenced his views of capitalism.

He gained fame playing football for Estudiantes de La Plata in his youth. In the 1930s, he worked as a shoemaker and organised a shoemakers’ and leather workers’ union in Córdoba, Argentina.

During this period he stood as a candidate for election in Buenos Aires province for the Partido Socialista Obrero. He then joined the Partido de la Revolución Socialista, which affiliated to the Fourth International in 1941 but the party quickly declined. In 1947, Cristalli and Dante Minazzoli founded the Grupo Cuarta Internacional (GCI) as a small circle of working class militants committed to Trotskyism.

== In the Trotskyist movement ==
Posadas did initially organize the Latin America Bureau of the Fourth International for the International Secretariat faction of the Fourth International in the 1950s. Under his guidance, the movement gained some influence in the region, particularly among Cuban railway workers, Bolivian tin miners and agricultural workers in Brazil.

When the Fourth International split in 1953, Posadas and his followers sided with Michel Pablo and the International Secretariat of the Fourth International. By 1959, however, he and his followers were quarrelling with the leadership of the ISFI accusing them of lacking confidence in the possibility of revolution. They also differed over the issue of nuclear war with Posadas taking the view that "War–Revolution" would "settle the hash of Stalinism and Capitalism" and that nuclear war was inevitable as a socialist society would rise from the ashes.

With Luis Naguill, Posadas directed the "subversive apparatus" founded according to instructions from the Tri-Continental – the Peasant Workers Alliance in 1966.

Conflicts between Posadas and the ISFI started to get worse. Cristalli, who is known as Posadas today, received his new name as it was used as the penname for the letters written to the ISFI. In those letters, Posadas and his followers made bold criticisms such as Trotskyist movements worldwide were largely influenced by the Bureau of Latin America (BLA) of the Fourth International at that time, and that the Europeans had become a passive force. Despite the alleged efforts of both the BLA and ISFI to reconcile, in the April of 1962, Posadas made a daring move as he called for a congress and completely reorganized the executive committee of the ISFI, now led by BLA leaders. The ISFI responded to this action in June by suspending BLA from the Fourth International. Posadas and his international followers, who were concentrated in Latin America, decided to split from the ISFI in 1962 (prior to its reunification with the International Committee of the Fourth International, which formed the United Secretariat of the Fourth International) and founded a new group.

== Posadista Fourth International ==
The "Posadists" founded their own Fourth International in 1962 after having called an Emergency Conference. The first regular international meeting of the Posadists should only happen in March 1964. It was announced as the "Seventh Congress of the Fourth International". Said Congress was – according to a post-conference communique – held "in Europe" without giving further elaboration, and the communique claimed that "delegates representing thirteen countries of Africa, Europe, and Latin America" were in attendance. The new International only started using the name Fourth International (Posadist) at a later time (in the early 1970s).

The Posadist Fourth International developed a concept of its organizational nature, with changes that were introduced in 1966 which varied substantially from the rest of the Trotskyist movement. Posadas commented on their "Tenth World Congress" in 1975:

There was not a single dispute. It is the most homogeneous Congress, not because we put disputes aside, but because there was no room for disputes. [... I]f the movement is not monolithic and centralizedly monolithic, it leaves the condition open to insecurity, to doubt, to preoccupation with irrelevant problems or secondary problems: then it distracts attention. [sic]

== Atomic war ==
At their 1964 "Seventh World Congress" the following resolution was adopted:

“We are preparing ourselves for a stage in which before the atomic war, we shall struggle for power, during the atomic war we shall struggle for power and we shall be in power, and immediately after the atomic war we shall be in power. There is no beginning, there is an end to atomic war, because atomic war is simultaneous. Simultaneity doesn't mean the same day and the same hour. Great historic events should not be measured by hours or days, but by periods. The working class alone will maintain itself, will immediately have to seek its cohesion and centralization".

This stance was made more specific at a 1966 meeting of the International Secretariat, where a manifesto written by Posadas was adopted:

After destruction commences, the masses are going to emerge in all countries – in a short time, in a few hours. Capitalism cannot defend itself in an atomic war except by putting itself in caves and attempting to destroy all that it can. The masses, in contrast, are going to come out, will have to come out, because it is the only way to survive, defeating the enemy… The apparatus of capitalism, police, army, will not be able to resist… It will be necessary to organise the workers' power immediately.

One of the best-known positions of J. Posadas was his enthusiasm for nuclear war. More precisely, at the height of the Cold War, Posadas thought that nuclear war was inevitable. His idea was that rather than wait for the forces of capitalism, the nuclear-armed socialist states should launch a preemptive attack that would destroy the nuclear capabilities of capitalist countries. Additionally, he believed that this sort of catastrophe could spark the world revolution.

Posadas vocally opposed the Partial Test Ban Treaty signed in 1963 by the United States, the Soviet Union, and the United Kingdom, believing that a nuclear war between the US and the Soviet Union was inevitable and desirable, and would create the conditions for socialism, with the "workers' states" winning and resetting society.

== Outlook towards the Soviet-Bloc regimes ==
The Posadists held to mainstream Trotskyist notions of describing the Soviet Republics that were established with the end of World War 2 as "deformed workers' states" based on the existence of generally nationalized means of production, but unlike the rest of the Trotskyist movement, Posadas went further, declaring other Regimes (such as "Syria, Egypt, Iraq, Mali, Guinea, Congo Brazzaville etc.") – sometimes with, sometimes without clarifying adjectives – to be "workers' states".

The justifications for these classifications as well as the explanations for the supposed progressive role of these regimes were compiled into Posadas' 1969 book The Revolutionary State.

== Cuba ==
The Posadist group in Cuba, the Revolutionary Workers' Party (Trotskyist) or POR(T), gained importance due to the Cuban Revolution, in which it had a minor role. Posadist guerrillas fought alongside Fidel Castro and Che Guevara in 1959. When the Posadists split from the Fourth International in 1962, they took the Cuban section with them, leaving no other Trotskyist group represented in Cuba in the 1960s.

In 1961 the POR(T) argued that the Cuban government should forcibly expel the American military base at Guantanamo Bay. According to state media, the Posadists organised workers in the town of Guantanamo to march on the nearby military base. The POR(T) denied the allegation, but it was repeated by the Trotskyist Socialist Workers Party in the US, which was pro-Castro and denounced the Posadists as ultra-left. Cuban officials affiliated with the Popular Socialist Party, then raided the headquarters of the Posadist group and smashed its printing press, which was in the process of printing an edition of Trotsky's The Permanent Revolution (1930).

Guevara, when asked in an interview about this event, commented:

That did happen. It was an error. It was an error committed by an official of second rank. They smashed the plates. It should not have been done. However, we consider the Trotskyist party to be acting against the revolution. For example, they were taking the line that the Revolutionary Government is petty bourgeois, and were calling on the proletariat to exert pressure on the government and even to carry out another revolution in which the proletariat would come to power. This was prejudicing the discipline necessary at this stage.

The Cuban Posadist section became increasingly militant and was banned by the government; Castro denounced them as "pestilential" at the Tricontinental Conference held in January 1966. Cuban Posadists went on to claim that Castro had Guevara killed when, it turned out, he was actually in Bolivia fighting with the guerrilla movement there. Conversely, after Guevara was executed by Bolivian authorities, Posadas claimed in 1967 that it was unclear how Che Guevara was killed.

== Extraterrestrial life ==
Beginning in 1968, Posadas also became known for his theories concerning UFOs and extraterrestrial life. If anything like UFOs existed, they could demonstrate the existence of agents able to master a very sophisticated technology, something that would be compatible with what in this planet was advocated by socialism. If UFOs existed, they could be allied in addressing some of the major problems in the earth.

One of his most well-known works is a 1968 pamphlet called Les Soucoupes Volantes, le processus de la matiere et de l'energie, la science et le socialisme (Flying Saucers, the process of matter and energy, science and socialism). Here, he connects the existence of extraterrestrial life and UFOs to communism. He argues that the UFOs being spotted at that time indicates the advancements of life in other planets and that that can be only possible because of communist ideologies. He also writes that capitalism tends to make people self-centered and focus on profits, rather than work on the scientific and civilizational progress of mankind. Since extraterrestrial beings have developed technology advanced enough to visit other planets, this indicates that they have surpassed the bane of a capitalistic society. Along with that, they have also surpassed their impulsion – the need to kill or control to assert dominance. Posadas shows enthusiasm to collaborate with extraterrestrial beings. He writes, "We must appeal to the beings on other planets, when they come here, to intervene and collaborate with Earth's inhabitants in suppressing poverty." With his argument, Posadas defines communism as a civilizational progress rather than an alternative political system. Although this is a single work of Posadas on extraterrestrial life, this idea has gained much popularity among his followers and later Trotskyists.

Posadas remarks that aliens "have no aggressive impulse, they have no need to kill in order to live: they come only to observe. We can foresee the existence of such beings, even taking into account the fantasies that exist among the reports, stories, observations, and statements".

== Long live Posadas! ==
Posadist newspapers such as Red Flag, published by the Revolutionary Workers Party (Trotskyist) in Britain, ran headlines praising Soviet cosmonauts and the launching of Chinese rockets as well as articles on local industrial disputes.

Posadas was thought to have a large ego as indicated by his habit of ending his articles by exclaiming "Long live Posadas!" This actually stemmed from the way he "wrote" his documents. They were usually the transcript of speeches delivered at party events, whether with a small group of closest collaborators, or larger activities. In the early years, after Posadas ended his speeches with "¡Viva la Revolución Mundial!" and "¡Viva la Cuarta Internacional!" ("Long live world revolution! Long live the Fourth International!"), someone else would traditionally yell "¡Viva el camarada Posadas!" ("Long live comrade Posadas!") – all this would be duly reported in print.

== Scholarly discourse on Posadism ==
Due to the radical nature of the Posadist theories and the egocentric administration of the Fourth International Posadist, there were many backlashes against it soon after its foundation. Joan Benevant, an Argentine militant, compared the organization to a church where Posadas acted as "the pope". Several member nations quit, the prominent ones being Brazil and Argentina. With the loss of several members and lack of support from scholars, Posadas continued to practice his principles nonetheless. Many scholars during at that time viewed his work in a satirical way, as seen in Teresa Hayter's autobiography Hayter of the bourgeoisie, where she describes Posadas as "the craziest of all deviators from Trotskyism". A work on Posadism was written by A. M. Gittlitz called I Want to Believe: Posadism, UFOs and Apocalypse Communism. The author reviews the history of Posadism and its ultimate collapse, and analyzes the significance of the current rise of interest on this topic. Taking the theme of approaching Posadism as a "crazy subfield" of Trotskyism like earlier scholars, Gittlitz expands on it by exploring the current thoughts on Posadism, how that has changed from its previous cult-like nature in the late 20th century.

== Publications ==
Articles

- "The Argentine Elections and the Tasks of the Proletariat." Fourth International (Amsterdam), no. 2 (March 1958), pp. 17–21. Full issue.
- "For Support and Extension of the Cuban Revolution." Fourth International (Amsterdam), no. 10 (June 1960), pp. 28–31. Full issue.

Pamphlets

- Les soucoupes volantes, le processus de la matière et de l’énergie, la science, la lutte de classes et revolutionnaire et le future socialiste de l’humanité. [Flying Saucers, the Process of Matter and Energy, Science, the Revolutionary and Working-Class Struggle and the Socialist Future of Mankind.] (in French). Paris: Éditions Réed (June 26, 1968). Audiobook available.

Translated into English and transcribed by David Broder.
