= Christoph Hörstel =

German publicist and political activist (born 1956)

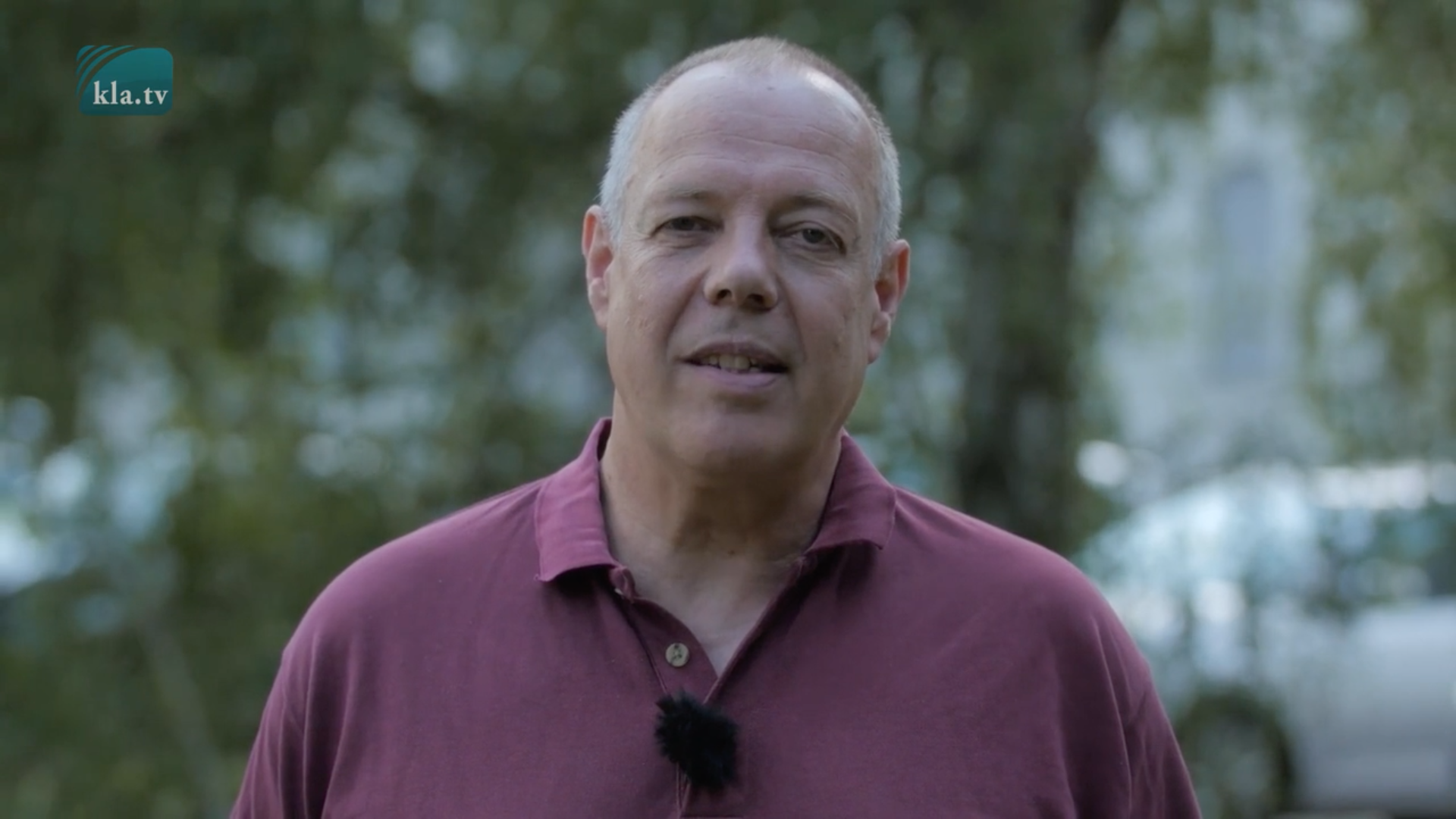
- Born: 1956 (age 69–70); Bremen, West Germany
- Occupations: publicist, political activist
- Political party: The New Centre (since 2017); German Centre (2013–2017)

Christoph R. Hörstel (born 1956) is a German publicist and political activist. Hörstel founded the German Centre (DM) political party which he led until his departure from the party in October 2017 under internal criticism of his leadership style. In November 2017, Hörstel revived a short-lived political party that he had originally founded in 2013, The New Centre (NM), which he leads to this day. Before his political career, Hörstel worked as a journalist for the ARD in Afghanistan, he is now mostly seen as discredited however with many of his views being described as conspiracy theories. Hörstel believes, for example, that 9/11 was in part orchestrated by the CIA and that the Afghanistan War was planned in advance. Hörstel is a critic of Israel and the German foreign policy towards the state.

== Publications ==
- Sprengsatz Afghanistan: Die Bundeswehr in tödlicher Mission. Knaur, München 2007, ISBN 3-426-78116-6.
- Brandherd Pakistan: Wie der Terrorkrieg nach Deutschland kommt. Kai Homilius Verlag, Werder an der Havel 2008, ISBN 3-89706-841-9.
- Afghanistan-Pakistan: Nato am Wendepunkt. Kai Homilius Verlag, Werder an der Havel 2010, ISBN 3-89706-417-0.
