= Alliance of German Democrats =

Alliance of German Democrats Allianz Deutscher Demokraten
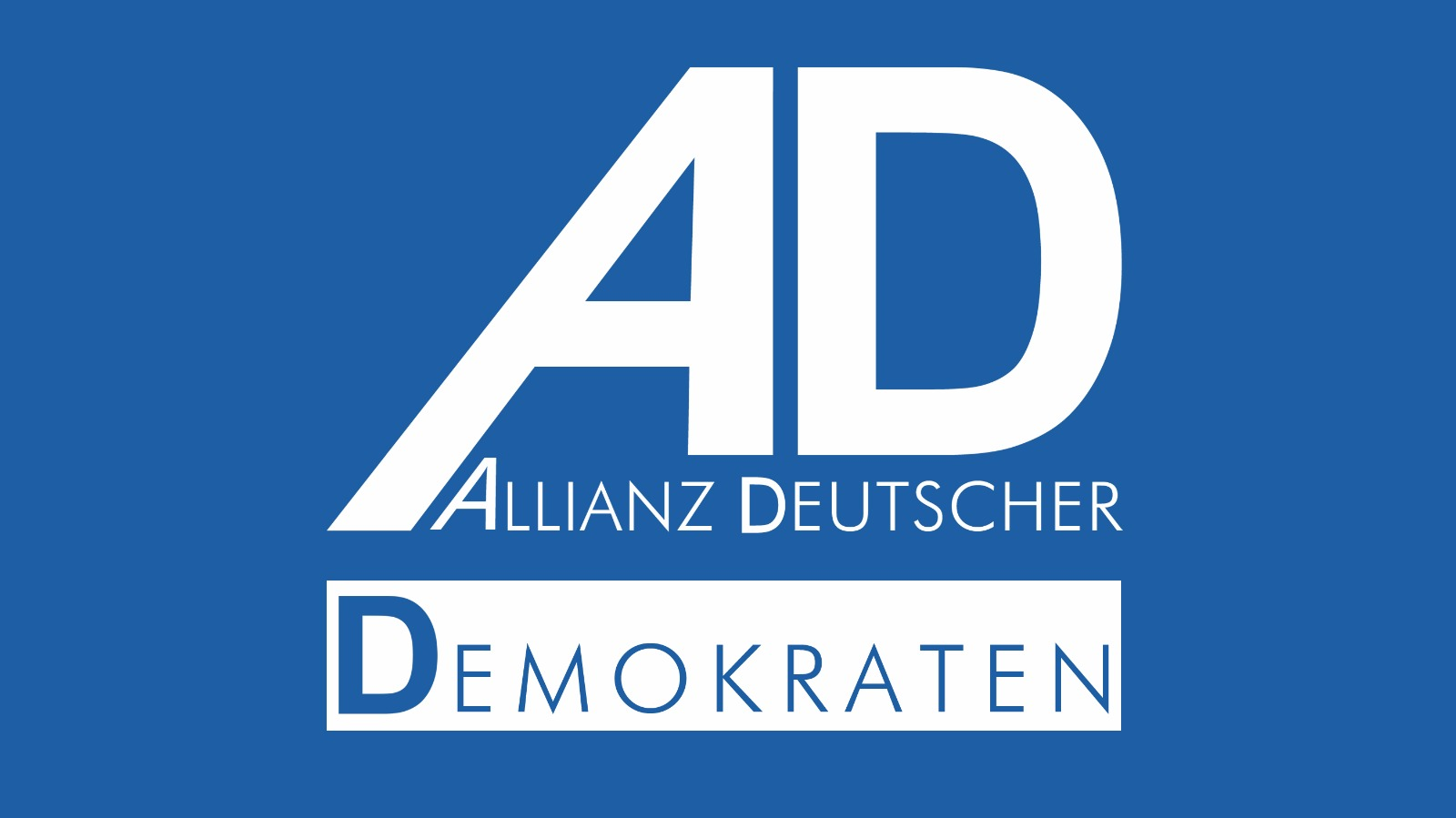
- Abbreviation: AD-D
- Leader: Ramazan Akbaş
- General Secretary: Uğur Karadağ
- Founded: 2 June 2016; 10 years ago
- Headquarters: Zebrafinkweg 8, 13129, Berlin, Germany
- Membership: 2,500
- Ideology: German Turkish interests Erdoğanism
- Colours: Blue
- Bundestag: 0 / 709
- European Parliament: 0 / 96

Website
- ad-demokraten.de

The Alliance of German Democrats (German: Allianz Deutscher Demokraten) is a minor party in Germany aimed primarily at immigrants of Turkish origin.

== History ==
This party was founded by the entrepreneur Remzi Aru in Nuremberg directly after the resolution on the Armenian Genocide. According to him, no party is more eligible for (especially Turkish) migrants in Germany. Experts see a clear proximity to Erdogan and the AKP and a "narrow choice basis", as the party would appeal primarily to Turks - of which only half may vote in Germany. The Alternative for Germany (German: Alternative für Deutschland; AfD) filed a complaint against the abbreviation ADD and won in the first instance.

In mid-December 2017, a regional association of AD-D was founded in Bavaria. The first regional chairman is the industrial engineer Taner Kaplan.

== Elections ==
The party ran for the first time in the state elections in North Rhine-Westphalia in 2017. It achieved 0.15% of the second votes cast.

The state list of the AD-D in North Rhine-Westphalia was approved for the 2017 federal election. During the election campaign, the party posted pictures of Erdogan with a Turkish slogan that translates as "Turkey friends - stand with them! Give them your votes! Grow with them!" Nationwide, it received 0.1 percent of the votes in NRW 0.4%. In a few cities, the party became the strongest party among those parties that did not reach the Bundestag, for example in Herne with 1.2%.

== See also ==
- Democratic Alliance for Diversity and Awakening
- Alliance for Innovation and Justice
