= Thomas Mosmann =

German politician and LGBT rights activist

Leader of the Alliance for Human Rights, Animal and Nature Protection in Baden-Württemberg
- In office 2016–2019
- Preceded by: Office established
- Succeeded by: Office abolished

Leader of the Democratic Gay/Lesbian Party - The People's Party
- In office 10 March 2013 – 1 May 2014
- Preceded by: Office established
- Succeeded by: Ingeborg Hepting (provisional)

Personal details
- Born: 20 December 1972 (age 53) Villingen, Baden-Württemberg, West Germany
- Party: Tierschutzallianz (until 2019)
- Other political affiliations: DSLP (2013–2014); NPD

Thomas Mosmann (born 20 December 1972) is a German LGBT rights activist and former politician. He was the city, district, and state leader of the Alliance for Human Rights, Animal and Nature Protection, as well as the party's lead candidate for the 2017 German federal election in Baden-Württemberg until leaving the party along with 15 other members over disagreements with the federal board.

Before his activities in the Tierschutzallianz, Mosmann was the founder and leader of the minor Democratic Gay/Lesbian Party - The People's Party. Mosmann has also been noted for his former sympathies with far-right groups, such as the National Democratic Party of Germany. He has since repeatedly distanced himself from his previous views and described his political standing in 2014 as "centre-left".

== Personal life ==
Thomas Mosmann was born in Villingen on 20 December 1972 and worked in a hotel as of 2015. Mosmann has described himself as gay, has three children, and lived in Tuttlingen until 2022.

== Political career ==
Mosmann first came to regional prominence through his support of the far-right National Democratic Party of Germany (NPD). He wrote letters to the editor in Schwäbische Zeitung as well as internet forum posts supporting the establishment of a local NPD office in his home town of Tuttlingen. In which, Mosmann had declared himself a sympathisier of the NPD, writing "I myself am the father of three children, gay, and a NPD sympathisier". In another post, Mosmann commented "Do you even know how many gay NPD/DVU sympathizers there are? More than you think". He supported the merger of the National Democratic Party of Germany with the German People's Union in 2010. Mosmann was also a member, not just supporter, of the NPD at the time.

In 2013, Mosmann founded the Democratic Gay/Lesbian Party - The People's Party (DSLP) in the Club 46, one of the oldest gay bars in Germany, in Villingen-Schwenningen and was elected as the party's leader. Upon being asked about his past, Mosmann asked for a second chance, claiming to have been on the wrong path and having changed his ways. Despite this, sources at the time noted nationalist sentiments in the first DSLP party program. On 1 May 2014, Mosmann left the DSLP and laid down all offices in the party.

Upon leaving the DSLP, Mosmann joined the Alliance for Human Rights, Animal and Nature Protection (Tierschutzallianz). On 8 March 2015 Mosmann, along with 34 others, founded the party's district section in Tuttlingen, the first in Baden-Württemberg and was elected its leader at the founding assembly. Mosmann had also been the leader of the party's state section in Baden-Württemberg as well as the city section of Tuttlingen since their respective establishments and until their dissolution. Mosmann was the party's lead candidate in the state of Baden-Württemberg in the 2017 German federal election as well as the 2019 European Parliament election in Germany and the 2016 Baden-Württemberg state election in the constituency of Tuttlingen-Donaueschingen. He also ran for mayor in Eigeltingen in 2015 and Sigmaringen in 2018. Mosmann left the party, along with 15 others, over disagreements with the federal board in 2019, citing an uncompromising and undemocratic party structure as well as the long distance to federal party meetings, which usually took place in Magdeburg.

In 2018, Mosmann was quoted in the Stuttgarter Zeitung, as a participant of a demonstration against racism, saying "It is important to stand up against the right – we need to start being mindful that things go forwards, not backwards!"

Mosmann expressed support for the founding of the political party Bündnis Sahra Wagenknecht on Instagram in October 2023.
