= Democratic Alliance for Diversity and Awakening =

Democratic Alliance for Diversity and Awakening Demokratische Allianz für Vielfalt und Aufbruch
- Abbreviation: DAVA
- Leader: Teyfik Ozcan
- Founded: 16 January 2024
- Membership (2024): 1,000
- Ideology: Minority rights (Muslim, Turkish); Political Islam (alleged); Erdoğanism (alleged)
- Colours: Teal

Website
- https://dava-eu.org/

The Democratic Alliance for Diversity and Awakening (German: Demokratische Allianz für Vielfalt und Aufbruch, DAVA) is a German political party that declares as its goal the protection of Muslim national minorities in Germany. The party has been criticized for its close ties to the Turkish government and its ruling party, with some media calling it the "Erdoğan Party".

== History ==
The party was introduced in January 2024, declaring its intention to participate in the European Parliament elections in June. The leadership of the DAVA party, led by journalist Teyfik Ozcan, also includes lawyer Fatih Zingal, Dr. Ali Ihsan Unlu, Commander of the Order of Merit of the Federal Republic of Germany; and Dr. Mustafa Yoldas.

== Ideology ==
According to the party's founding declaration, DAVA demands that people of foreign origin be given full rights, pointing out that very often "when looking for apartments or jobs, as well as in many everyday situations, such as dealing with authorities, they feel that they are not accepted as full rights members of European society." The party also aims to tackle child poverty and old age problems, demanding more social benefits and calling for a "pragmatic and non-ideological refugee policy."

The Citizenship Modernization Act passed in 2024 would allow the party to draw on a larger voter potential. It is estimated that between 5.3 and 5.6 million Muslims live in Germany, of whom around 2.5 million are of Turkish origin. If they were to vote for DAVA, the party would most likely clear the 5% threshold and enter the Bundestag. However, many Turks and other Muslims do not share similar positions to DAVA on multiple issues, and thus may not vote for DAVA.

== Criticism ==
The German newspaper Bild criticized the DAVA party, calling it Recep Tayyip Erdoğan's Islamist lever of influence in German politics. It is known that all members of the DAVA party leadership were members of the Justice and Development Party or its subsidiaries.

== Election results ==
=== European Parliament ===
Election	List leader	Votes	%	Seats	+/–	EP Group
2024	Fatih Zingal	148,724	0.37 (#19)	0 / 96	New	–

== See also ==
- Turkish-Islamic Union for Religious Affairs
- Alliance of German Democrats
- Alliance for Innovation and Justice
- DENK, a similar party in the Netherlands
- Long arm of Ankara
