= Democratic Party of Germany (2009) =

Democratic Party of Germany Demokratische Partei Deutschlands
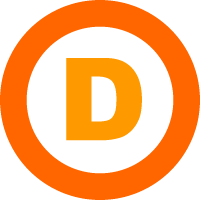
- Leader: Markus Giersch
- Founded: June 20, 2009; 16 years ago
- Dissolved: 2012; 14 years ago
- Newspaper: Sozialismus21
- Ideology: Socialism of the 21st century Grassroots democracy
- Colors: Orange

Website
- www.demokratische-partei.org (archive) www.dpd-partei.de (archive)

The Democratic Party of Germany (German: Demokratische Partei Deutschlands; DPD) was a short-lived minor political party in Germany.

== History ==
The Democratic Party of Germany was founded in Darmstadt on 20 June 2009 under resolution of the minor group Bundesbanner "Schwarz-Rot-Gold" - Bund der Demokraten e.V. (a name in reference to the Reichsbanner) in cooperation with some independents. The party was officially registered with the Federal Returning Officer on 27 August 2009.

The DPD received 0.5% of the vote during the Ortsbeirat election in the Frankfurt borough of Nieder-Eschbach, part of the 2011 Hesse local elections, falling short of winning a seat. During this election, the party ran six candidates, including its leader.

The party was dissolved in 2012 and removed from the Returning Officers' collection in 2015. The Democratic Army Faction (German: Demokratische Armee Fraktion), which succeeded it, attributed the failure of the party to the political system it operated in.

== Ideology ==
The party openly espoused socialism of the 21st century as its official ideology. It called itself "the only party in Germany that fundamentally thinks about the political system" while advocating for the expansion of democracy and wishing to further devolve power to the local level. It also advocated for a variable basic income and criticized local noise pollution.

The party viewed itself as standing in the tradition of those parties with the same name that came before it, especially the 1947 Democratic Party of Germany.

== Election results ==
=== Local elections ===
Year	Nieder-Eschbach	
Year	Votes	%
2011	295	0.5
