= Office for the Protection of the Constitution of Lower Saxony =

The Office for the Protection of the Constitution of Lower Saxony is the state authority for the protection of the constitution of Lower Saxony, based in Hanover. In organizational terms, it is Department 5 in the Lower Saxony Ministry of the Interior and Sport. Its tasks include the prevention of extremism and espionage, for which it also uses intelligence resources. To this end, it had almost 320 full-time staff units and almost 23 million euros at its disposal in 2019. The President of the Office for the Protection of the Constitution is Dirk Pejril..

== Legal basis ==
The general legal basis for the Office for the Protection of the Constitution is the Basic Law and the Federal Constitutional Protection Act. The specific legal basis is the State Constitutional Protection Act in the version announced on August 2, 2021 (Nds. GVBl. p. 564).

== Duties ==
The task of the Office for the Protection of the Constitution is to collect and evaluate information, in particular factual and personal information, news and documents, on

1. Efforts directed against the free democratic basic order, the existence or security of the Federation or a state or aimed at unlawfully impairing the conduct of the constitutional bodies of the Federation or a state or their members,
2. security-endangering or intelligence service activities in the Federal Republic of Germany for a foreign power,
3. Efforts in the Federal Republic of Germany to endanger the foreign interests of the Federal Republic of Germany through the use of violence or preparatory actions aimed at such use,
4. Efforts that are directed against the idea of international understanding (Article 9 paragraph 2 of the Basic Law) or against the peaceful coexistence of peoples (Article 26 paragraph 1 of the Basic Law).

The Office for the Protection of the Constitution informs the Lower Saxony State Parliament and the Lower Saxony State Government about the nature and extent of efforts and activities. On the basis of its evaluation results, it informs the public about efforts and activities through summary reports and other measures and also counteracts such efforts and activities by offering information and opportunities to opt out.

The Office for the Protection of the Constitution is involved in security checks, technical security measures to protect facts, objects or findings that need to be kept secret in the public interest against access by unauthorized persons, in the screening of persons in other cases provided for by law and in the screening of persons in the public interest with their consent.

== Powers ==
The Office for the Protection of the Constitution may use intelligence means to covertly gather information, in particular to covertly collect personal data, which are exhaustively listed in Section 14 of the State Constitution Protection Act. These include the use of informants, undercover employees, surveillance, monitoring of radio traffic, the use of legends, cover documents and identification marks, monitoring of letters, post and telecommunications traffic in accordance with Article 10 of the Act and covert monitoring of the Internet. The Office for the Protection of the Constitution may also inspect files, records and registers kept by public bodies.

== Outline ==
Department 5 (Constitutional Protection) in the Lower Saxony Ministry of the Interior and Sport is structured as follows:

- Section 51 – legal, data protection, G 10
- Section 52 – left-wing extremism/-terrorism, terrorism and extremism with foreign reference connections, cross-departmental principle
- Section 53 – right-wing extremism/terrorism, extremism prevention
- Section 54 – Islamism/Islamic terrorism
- Section 55 – Economic protection, counterintelligence, surveillance, secret protection
- Section 56 – central services

== Control ==
The Office for the Protection of the Constitution is subject to various controls. These include general parliamentary control by the members of the Lower Saxony State Parliament due to the reporting obligations of the Minister of the Interior and Sport in the context of current affairs, minor and major inquiries or petitions. There is also special parliamentary control by the Committee for Affairs of the Office for the Protection of the Constitution of the State Parliament, and the State Parliament can set up investigative committees. The State Commissioner for Data Protection of Lower Saxony monitors compliance with data protection regulations and its right to inspect files. The Lower Saxony State Audit Office has a right of review with regard to the budget. The actions of the Office for the Protection of the Constitution can be judicially reviewed on an ad hoc basis. Ultimately, the Office for the Protection of the Constitution is subject to constant and intensive monitoring by the public and the media, who critically assess its tasks and work.

== History ==
As only became known in 1986, the Lower Saxony Office for the Protection of the Constitution carried out a covert operation in 1978 with the Celler Loch in order to infiltrate an informant into the Red Army Faction under a “false flag”.

In 1999, two Russian spies in the Eurofighter project were discovered by the Lower Saxony Office for the Protection of the Constitution.

=== Internal espionage cases ===
In 1990, statements by the former officer of the Main Directorate for Reconnaissance (HVA) Karl-Christoph Großmann revealed that the two employees of the Lower Saxony Office for the Protection of the Constitution, Hans-Joachim Armborst and Wilhelm Balke, were double agents of the Ministry for State Security (MfS) of the GDR. Armborst's and Balke's information gave the Stasi insight into the activities and plans of the state office for years until the fall of the Berlin Wall. Armborst was head of the methodological counter-espionage department. Among other things, he revealed the method of the travel route search measures. He was often present when the heads of counter-espionage at the state offices for the protection of the constitution met with representatives of Department 4 of the Federal Office for the Protection of the Constitution (BfV), which is responsible for counter-espionage. He was listed as an unofficial employee Maurer (XV 3199/82) and received 40,000 DM annually, a total of about 430,000 DM. 499 source reports are attributed to him. At the beginning of May 1986, he took part in an expert conference on the reorganization of counter-espionage after the defection of Hansjoachim Tiedge and in mid-October 1987 in the discussion of the new framework concept for counter-espionage in the BfV. Armborst was sentenced to seven years imprisonment by the Celle Higher Regional Court on 18 January 1996 after a five-month trial at the age of 52.

In 1977, Balke joined the MfS's Main Directorate for Reconnaissance (HVA). He was frustrated that he had not been promoted appropriately and was convinced of the incompetence of his superiors. The HVA gave him the code name Gräber (XV-2982/78) and an annual salary of 20,000 DM. In return, he provided detailed information on the Federal Republic's border surveillance, but was not directly involved in counter-espionage activities.. From May 1980 to August 1989, he was responsible for 658 pieces of information, mainly relating to the operational work of the Office for the Protection of the Constitution. In 1994, Balke was sentenced by the Celle Higher Regional Court to nine years in prison for treason and bribery.

== Controversies ==
In the 1980s, Hans Dieter Lepzien (NSDAP/AO) constructed the bombs for the assassinations of the “Group Otte” operating in Lower Saxony. He had worked with the bombers on behalf of the Lower Saxony Office for the Protection of the Constitution.

The journalist Andrea Röpke was monitored by the Lower Saxony Office for the Protection of the Constitution from 2006 to 2012. A request by the journalist to the Office for the Protection of the Constitution in 2012 as to whether data about her had been stored was denied. However, this statement was false.

In September 2013, the Lower Saxony Office for the Protection of the Constitution informed sports journalist Ronny Blaschke that he had been illegally placed in an extremism database. As it turned out a short time later, he had only been observed by mistake. It was a case of a mix-up of names. The person in question was Ronald Blaschke, born in 1959, a research assistant to Left Party leader Katja Kipping and spokesperson for the Basic Income Network.

In November 2018, an informant in Göttingen was exposed because a constitutional protection file that had been sent to a court had not been properly cleaned up in the interests of source protection. As a result, the then president had to vacate her post.

== Leadership ==
Period	Name	Notes
1953 - 1959	Karl Hofmann	Founding Director
from 1959	Max Schwarz	Previously a member of the Lower Saxony State Parliament
	Hellmut Jüllig	
1984 - 1987	Peter Frisch	Since 1975 he has been with the Lower Saxony Office for the Protection of the Constitution, which he took over as head of in 1984. The so-called Celle Hole occurred during his time in 1978. In 1987 he moved to the Federal Office for the Protection of the Constitution.
until 1993	Hansjürgen Knoche	Resignation for health reasons
1994 - 2000	Rolf Peter Minnier	Was placed into early retirement at his own request.
2001 - 2006	Volker Homuth	Later became head of the Lower Saxony State Office for Statistics
2007 - 2009	Günter Heiß	He was coordinator of the federal intelligence services from 2010 to 2018.
Januar 2010 bis 4. März 2013	Hans-Werner Wargel	Before his appointment, he was police chief in Göttingen. He was temporarily retired after the state elections in 2013.
5. March 2013 - 31. December 2018	Maren Brandenburger	First woman to hold the presidency, until then responsible for public relations in the agency.
1. January 2019 -October 2022	Bernhard Witthaut	Previously a member of the Lower Saxony police and for a long time released from duty for trade union work
since 23. Dezember 2022	Dirk Pejril	He worked in the field of crime prevention at the Göttingen Police Department and has worked in the Lower Saxony Ministry of the Interior since 2013.
