= Reiner Fuellmich =

German jurist (b. 1958)

- Born: 1958 (age 67–68); Bremen
- Occupation: Ex-Lawyer
- Website: fuellmich.com

Reiner Fuellmich (born 1958 in Bremen) is a German former lawyer and spokesman for the Corona Investigative Committee, a non-governmental investigative committee based in Germany. He allegedly played an important role in proving the Volkswagen emissions scandal according to himself, and successfully sued Deutsche Bank where he previously worked, in a few small mortgage cases. In 2020, Fuellmich and his colleagues began documenting what they consider to be violations of law, medical malpractice, and scientific fraud, in connection with what they refer to as the "COVID-19 scandal."

== Education and career ==
Fuellmich studied law at the University of Göttingen and as an exchange student at the University of California in Los Angeles. He then worked from 1985 to 2001 at the research centre for medical and pharmaceutical law as a research assistant at the chair of Erwin Deutsch at the law faculty of the University of Göttingen, where he also obtained his doctorate. During this time, he was also part of the ethics committees of the University Hospitals of Göttingen and Hanover. He also held positions in corporate banking at Deutsche Bank, first as a trainee in Germany from 1990 and then in Japan until 1992.

In 1993, he founded his own law firm. He was admitted to the State Bar of California in 1993; as of July 2, 2024, he is no longer eligible to practice there. He is a member of the German-American and German-Japanese bar associations. In 2009, Fuellmich's law firm was ranked among the top 20 law firms for investor protection in Germany, especially since 1996 as a specialist for injured parties of so-called junk real estate.

Alongside international lawyers, Fuellmich offered companies the opportunity to join a class action lawsuit in the United States in an attempt to recover damages "caused by mismanagement based on German virologist Christian Drosten's allegedly faulty application of the PCR-test."

== Arrest and detention ==
In September 2022, Viviane Fischer, a partner with Fuellmich on the "Corona Investigative Committee" alleged that Fuellmich had embezzled funds raised for the committee by overbilling for his legal services. Fuellmich denied the allegations and claimed that they were politically motivated in order to sabotage this committee and its investigation of so-called deep state involvement in the global COVID-19 response. An arrest warrant was issued in March 2023, when Fuellmich was in Mexico. Later in October, he was extradited to Germany and then arrested. In April 2025, he was sentenced to three years and nine months in prison. His licence to practise law was revoked.
