= Alliance for Innovation and Justice =

Alliance for Innovation and Justice Bündnis für Innovation und Gerechtigkeit
- Abbreviation: BIG
- Leader: Haluk Yildiz
- Founded: 21 February 2010; 16 years ago
- Headquarters: Peter-Sander-Straße 15, 55252, Wiesbaden
- Membership: 2000
- Ideology: Muslim interests Political Islam (alleged); Erdoğanism (alleged)
- Political position: Right-wing
- European political alliance: Free Palestine Party
- Colours: Orange
- Bundestag: 0 / 630
- European Parliament: 0 / 96

Website
- www.bigpartei.de

The Alliance for Innovation and Justice (German: Bündnis für Innovation und Gerechtigkeit; BIG) is a minor party in Germany aimed primarily at immigrants of Islamic origin. It was founded in the city of Cologne in 2010.

== History ==
BIG was established in Cologne in March 2010 when three regional voters associations from Bonn, Cologne, and Gelsenkirchen merged. Later, BIG was merged with other Muslim-interests political party, Alliance for Peace & Fairness (BFF), and started calling itself "BIG Bonn".

In 2013, the MDU took part in the annual anti-Israel Quds Day demonstration in Berlin with banners and leaflets. The chairman and spokesperson of the MDU, Bilal Uwe Wilbert, a member of the BIG board from 2014, was one of the main speakers at the Al-Quds demonstration in 2013 as well as in 2014 in Berlin.

In March 2014, the Muslim Democratic Union (MDU), Islamist political party that was founded in Osnabrück in 2010 and was mainly active in Lower Saxony joined BIG. Since its founding, BIG has only been able to win a small amount of seats at local level.

== Ideology ==
According to its own statements, BIG wants to campaign for the interests of migrants and wants to change society in Germany by "achieving social justice through multicultural, diverse and innovative solutions". In its 2024 European election manifesto, it supports open migration and refugee policies, it demands that language classes for migrants be made mandatory in order to promote their participation in German society. BIG also demands that asylum procedures be accelerated.

== Controversy ==
BIG is considered by some sources to be a German offshoot of the right-wing Turkish Justice and Development Party. The party leadership, however, claims its independence from AK. After investigation by law enforcement, no evidence could be found that the founders or members of the party were affiliated Turkish government.

== Election results ==
=== Federal Parliament (Bundestag) ===
Election	Constituency		Party list		Seats	+/–	Status
Election	Votes	%	Votes	%	Seats	+/–	Status
2017	2,680	0.01 (#23)	17,743	0.04 (#22)	0 / 709	New	Extra-parliamentary

=== European Parliament ===
Election	Votes	%	Seats	+/–	EP Group	
2019	68,647	0.18 (#23)	0 / 96	New	–	
2024	31,141	0.08 (#29)	0 / 96	0	-	As part of Free Palestine Party
