= K-Groups (Germany) =

Term referring to Maoist organizations in West Germany

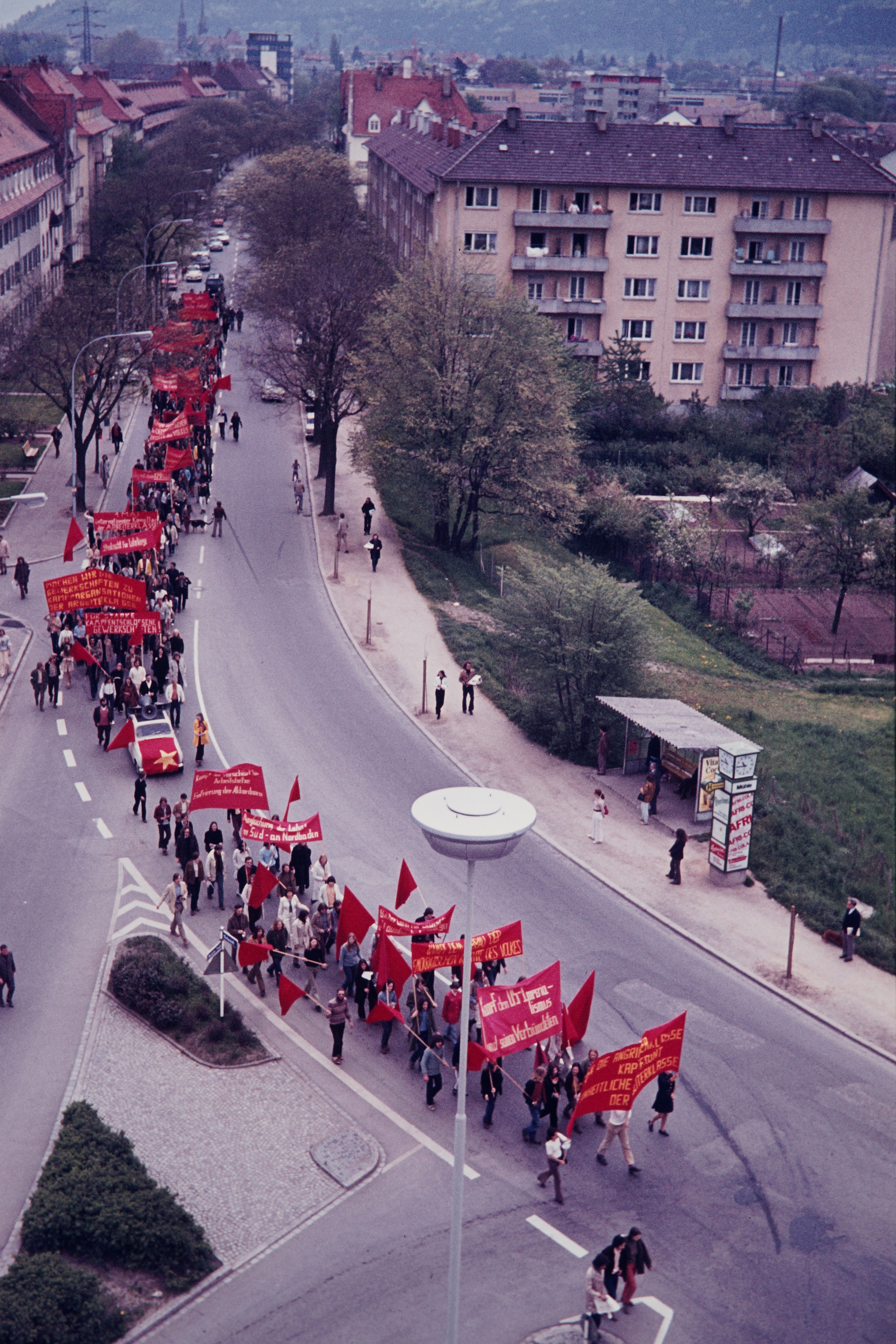
A K-Group in Freiburg at a May Day demonstration (May 1, 1972)

K-Groups (German: Kommunistische Gruppen, lit. 'Communist Groups') is a term referring to various small, Maoist organizations and political parties that sprang up in West Germany at the end of the 1960s, following the collapse of the Socialist German Students' Union (SDS), and general collapse of the West German student movement. K-Groups played a particularly important role within the New Left in West Germany during the first half of the 1970s. The term "K-Group" was used primarily by competing left-wing groups and in the media. It served as a collective term for the numerous, often fiercely divided groups and alluded to their shared self-image as communist cadre organizations.

Various organizations referred to as K-Groups included the Communist Party of Germany/Marxists–Leninists (KPD/ML), the Communist Party of Germany (Organizational Structure) (KPD-AO), the Communist League (KB), the Communist League of West Germany (KBW), the Communist Workers Union of Germany (KABD), and the Bavarian-based Workers League for the Reconstruction of the KPD (AB).

In 1971 the Federal Office for the Protection of the Constitution estimated that Germany had around twenty active Maoist groups, with 800 - 15,000 members between them. Following the death of Mao Zedong in 1976, K-Groups began to fade in membership and salience. Numerous activists subsequently joined the newly formed peace and environmental movement and the resulting Green Party (now Alliance 90/The Greens). Maoist activists from workplace interventions and factory groups, who had initially hoped for immediate revolution, now became long-term active members of workers' council and trade unions. Only the Marxist–Leninist Party of Germany (MLPD) has established itself permanently.

Other contemporary German far-left parties, such as the Socialist Unity Party of West Berlin (SEW) and German Communist Party (DKP), were not considered K-Groups, as they were oriented towards Eastern European "real socialism." Today however, the term is sometimes used somewhat vaguely in German media as a collective term for all small socialist or communist parties/organizations beyond the Social Democratic Party of Germany (SPD) and Die Linke.

== History ==
=== Origins within the Student Movement ===
Previously mentioned, K-groups emerged toward the end of the West German student movement in the late 1960s. Most K-Groups emerged from various regional chapters of the disintegrating Socialist German Students' Union. Although efforts were made to reach out to apprentices, workers, and especially former members of the banned Communist Party of Germany, most K-groups remained dominated by students and intellectuals. Many K-groups were characterized by an elitist attitude among their members. Unlike the student movement, they often propagated an ascetic lifestyle. Culturally, the K-groups often drew inspiration from the proletarian literature of the Weimar Republic, Chinese socialist realism, and Albanian folklore.

According to German Sociologist Gunnar Hincks, he theorized that the adoption of authoritarian power and subjugation techniques by children from middle-class backgrounds was often caused by family disruptions during the war and post-war period and a period of orientation that gave rise to a strong need for recognition and group affiliation, even to the point of sectarianism.

=== Ideological "Role Models" ===
Almost all K-groups viewed themselves as legitimate heirs of the historic Communist Party of Germany. They were united in their rejection of Eastern European socialism following Khrushchev's De-Stalinization campaign in 1956, which they dismissed as "revisionist." K-Groups ideologically referred to Mao Zedong's Chinese model of socialism, or to Joseph Stalin's tenure as General Secretary of the CPSU. After Mao's death and the associated change of course in China, some groups re-oriented themselves toward Albania under Enver Hoxha. Given the ideological breadth of the K-Groups, and a lack of unity, controversy and splits were common and often difficult for outsiders to understand. Critics have therefore often accused the K-groups of a tendency toward ideological "self-flagellation" and political sectarianism. There were, however, attempts to emphasize common themes and overcome fragmentation among themselves. In isolated cases, there was even cooperation with Trotskyist groups that had previously been strongly opposed, which lead to the founding of the United Socialist Party (VSP) in 1986 By this time, however, the K-groups had already lost importance.

=== Reception by the Political Establishment ===
Viewing the K-Groups as an "interface to terrorism," the Christian Democratic Union of Germany demanded that the K-Groups be banned, with specific focus on the KBW, KPD, and KPD/ML.

=== Decline and Transition ===
Following the Decline of the K-Groups in the 1970s, many former members went onto contribute their views to the activities of segments of the new social movements, such as the environmental movement, peace/anti-war movement, and anti-imperialist movement. Through these movements, numerous former K-Group members turned activists later found a new political home within the German Green Party, or the establishment left (SPD/PDS) such as:

- Winfried Kretschmann (KBW)
- Ralf Fücks (KBW)
- Winfried Nachtwei (KBW)
- Krista Sager (KBW)
- Joscha Schmierer (KBW)
- Ulla Schmidt (KBW)
- Jürgen Trittin (KB)
- Andrea Gysi (KB)
- Antje Vollmer (League)

== List of K-Groups ==
In Germany
Organization		Dates	Leaders	Literary Publication(s)	Succeeded By / Merged Into
Marxist-Leninist Party of Germany (1965–1968); Marxistisch-Leninistische Partei Deutschlands (1965–1968)	MLPD (1965)	1965 - 1968	Erich Reimann	Sozialistisches Deutschland; Socialist Germany	-
Free Socialist Party/Marxist-Leninists; Freie Sozialistische Partei/Marxisten-Leninisten	FSP (ML)	1967 - 1968	Günter Ackermann; Werner Heuzeroth	Die Wahrheit; The Truth	Communist Party of Germany/Marxists–Leninists
Communist Party of Germany/Marxists–Leninists; Kommunistische Partei Deutschlands/Marxisten-Leninisten	KPD/ML	1968 - 1986	Ernst Aust; Horst-Dieter Koch	Roter Morgen; Red Morning	United Socialist Party
Communist Party of Germany (Pre-Party Formation); Kommunistische Partei Deutschlands (Aufbauorganisation)	KPD (AO)	1970 - 1980	Dieter Kunzelmann; Horst Mahler	Die Rote Fahne; The Red Flag	-
League against Imperialism; Liga gegen den Imperialismus	League	1971 - 1990	(Front organization of the KPD (AO)): Jochen Staadt	Internationale Solidarität; International Solidarity	
Communist League (West Germany); Kommunistischer Bund	KB	1971 - 1991	Knut Mellenthin	Arbeiterkampf; Workers' Struggle	-
Communist Workers Union of Germany; Kommunistischer Arbeiterbund Deutschlands	KABD	1972 - 1982	Willi Dickhut; Stefan Engel	Rote Fahne; Red Flag	Marxist–Leninist Party of Germany
Workers' League for the Reconstruction of the KPDArbeiterbund für den Wiederaufbau der KPD	AB	1973 -	Helge Sommerrock; Thomas Schmitz-Bender	Kommunistischen Arbeiterzeitung Communist Workers' Newspaper	German Communist Party
Communist League of West Germany Kommunistischer Bund Westdeutschland	KBW	1973 - 1985	Helga Rosenbaum	Kommunistische Volkszeitung Communist People's Newspaper	League of West German Communists
Marxist-Leninists GermanyMarxisten-Leninisten Deutschland	MLD	1976 - 1981	Heiner Hügel	Die Achtziger Jahre The Eighties	-
League of West German Communists Bund Westdeutscher Kommunisten	BWK	1980 - 1995	Martin Fochler; Jörg Detjen	Politische Berichte Political Reports	Party of Democratic Socialism
Popular Front against Reaction, Fascism and WarVolksfront gegen Reaktion, Faschismus und Krieg	VF	1980 - 1994	(Suspected front organization of the XYZ by the Federal Office for the Protection of the Constitution)	Volksecho Popular Response	Association of Persecutees of the Nazi Regime – Federation of Antifascists (Minority)
United Socialist Party Vereinigte Sozialistische Partei'	VSP	1986 - 1991	(Front organization of the GIM and KPD/ML)	Sozialistische Zeitung Socialist Newspaper	Party of Democratic Socialism (Minority) International Socialist Left (Majority)
Marxist–Leninist Party of Germany Marxistisch–Leninistische Partei Deutschlands	MLPD	1982–Present	Stefan Engel	Rote Fahne Red Flag	-

=== Similar Organizations in Europe ===
At the same time in other countries in Western Europe, left-wing extra-parliamentary student movements in the 1960s sprang-up, inspired by the 1966 Cultural Revolution, with ensuing successor and splinter parties comparable to the German K-groups in terms of content and structure emerged, and continued to emerge. Similar parties in Western Europe rejected the Eastern European, Brezhnevite, "real socialism" and were also generally oriented towards Maoist China or Hoxhaite Albania, all generally declining after the death of Mao Zedong.

In Europe
Organization			Dates	Leaders	Literary Publication(s)	Successors
Netherlands	Communist Unity Movement of the Netherlands (Marxist–Leninist)	KEN (ml)	1964 - 1985	Nico Schrevel; Daan Monjé	Rode Vlag	
Ireland	Communist Party of Ireland (Marxist–Leninist)	CPI (ML)	1965 - 2003	Hardial Bains	Red Patriot	-
Austria	Marxist-Leninists of Austria	MLÖ	1966 - 1967	Franz Strobl	Rote Fahne	Marxist–Leninist Party of Austria
Austria	Marxist–Leninist Party of Austria	MLPÖ	1967 - 1968	Franz Strobl	Rote Fahne	Union of Revolutionary Workers of Austria (Marxist–Leninist)
Austria	Union of Revolutionary Workers of Austria (Marxist–Leninist)	VRAÖ (ML)	1966 - 2005	Alfred Jocha	Der Kommunist (1967–1970) Für die Volksmacht (1970 - 1997; 1999 - 2005) Widerspruch (1997 - 1999)	-
Austria	Communist League of Austria	KBÖ	1976 - 1981	(Austrian sect of the KBW)	Klassenkampf	-
Switzerland	Communist Party of Switzerland/Marxist–Leninists	KPS/ML	1969 - 1987	Nils Andersson	Oktober	Liberal-Socialist Party (FSP)
Iceland	Communist Movement M-L	KHML	1972 - 1976	Gunnar Andrésson; Kristján Guðlaugsson	Stéttabaráttan	Communist Party of Iceland (Marxist–Leninist)
Iceland	Communist Party of Iceland (Marxist–Leninist)	KSML	1976 - 1985	Gunnar Andrésson; Kristján Guðlaugsson	Stéttabaráttan	-
Luxembourg	Communist League of Luxembourg	KBL	1972 - 1980	Charles Doerner	Roude Fändel	-
Norway	Workers' Communist Party	AKP	1973 - 2007	Sigurd Allern; Pål Steigan	Klassekampen	Red Party
San Marino	Communist Party (Marxist–Leninist) of San Marino	PCMLSM	1968 - 1974	Giuseppe Fabbri		

== See also ==
- Außerparlamentarische Opposition
- West German student movement
- New Communist Movement
- La Chinoise
- Autonomism
- Workerism
- Proletarian Democracy
- New Left in Japan
