= 1976 West German federal election =

- 3 October 1976

All 496 seats in the Bundestag (Note: As well as the 22 non-voting delegates representing West Berlin, elected by the West Berlin Legislature.) 249 seats needed for a majority
- Registered: 42,058,015 (▲1.5%)
- Turnout: 90.7% (▼0.4pp)
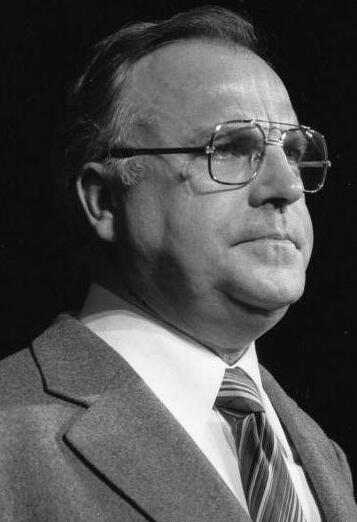

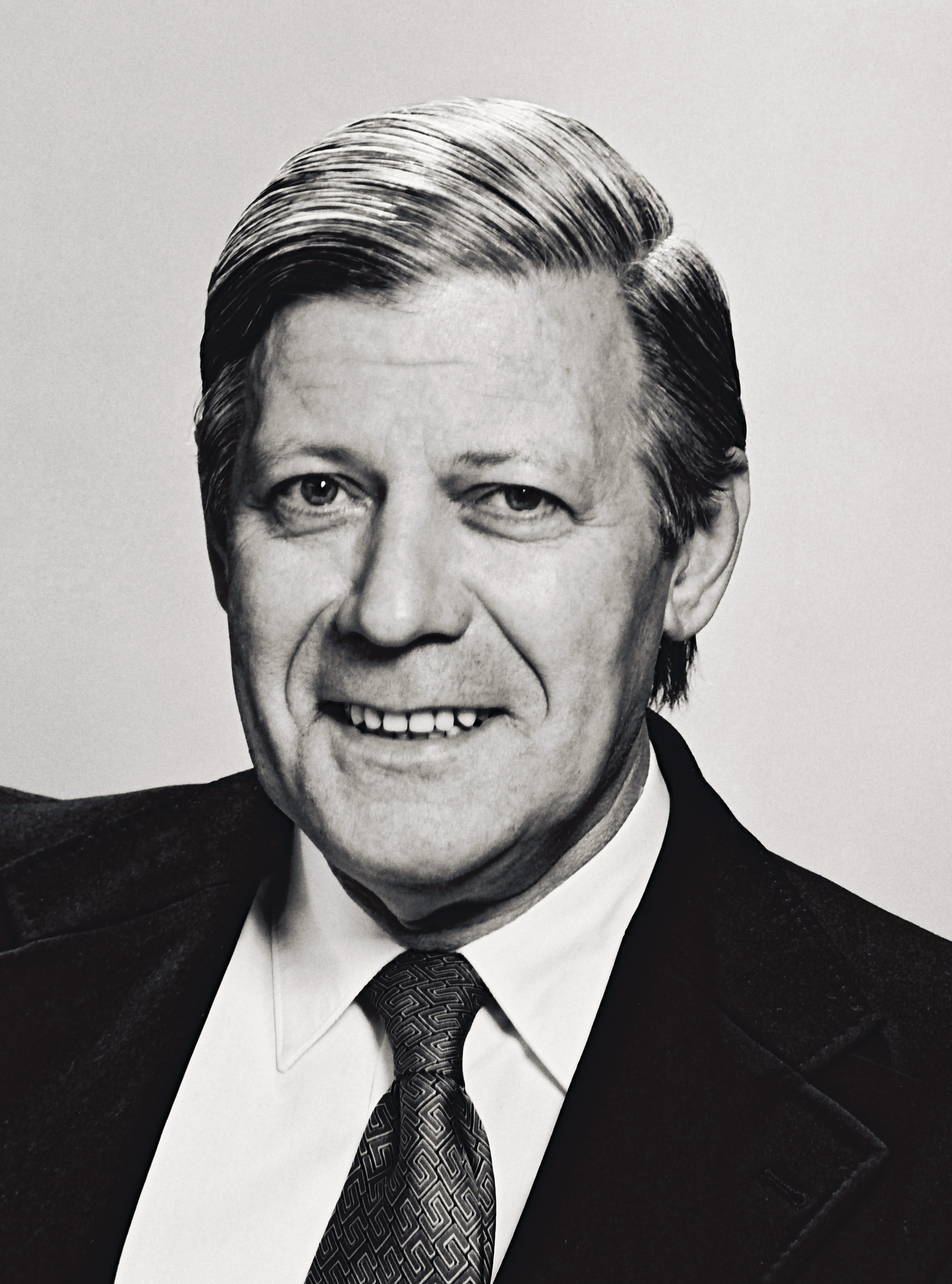

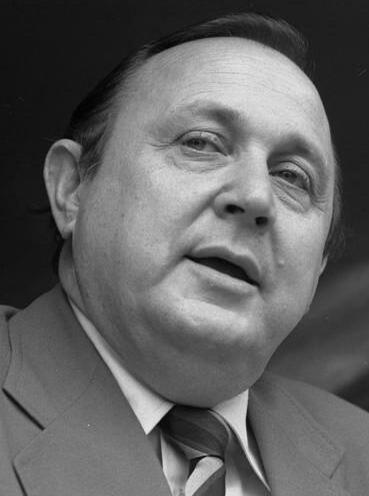
	First party	Second party	Third party
Candidate	Helmut Kohl	Helmut Schmidt	Hans-Dietrich Genscher
Party	CDU/CSU	SPD	FDP
Last election	44.9%, 225 seats	45.8%, 230 seats	8.4%, 41 seats
Seats won	243 (Note: As well as 11 non-voting delegates for West Berlin.)	214 (Note: As well as 10 non-voting delegates for West Berlin.)	39 (Note: As well as 1 non-voting delegate for West Berlin.)
Seat change	▲18	▼16	▼2
Popular vote	18,394,801	16,099,019	2,995,085
Percentage	48.6%	42.6%	7.9%
Swing	▲3.7 pp	▼3.2 pp	▼0.5 pp
- The left side shows constituency winners of the election by their party colours. The right side shows party list winners of the election for the additional members by their party colours.
Government before election
First Schmidt cabinet
SPD–FDP
Government after election
Second Schmidt cabinet
SPD–FDP

A federal election was held in West Germany on 3 October 1976 to elect the members of the 8th Bundestag. Although the CDU/CSU alliance became the largest faction in parliament, Helmut Schmidt of the Social Democratic Party remained Chancellor.

== Campaign ==
The coalition of the SPD and the FDP wanted to be re-elected, with the SPD, since 1974 led by Helmut Schmidt, the party's candidate for Chancellor. The CDU and the CSU tried to achieve an absolute majority of the votes to make CDU chairman Helmut Kohl Chancellor, but they fell six seats short of their target.

=== Opinion polls ===
Polling firm	Fieldwork date	Sample size	Union	SPD	FDP	Others	Abstention	Lead
1976 federal election	3 Oct 1976	–	48.6	42.6	7.9	0.9	9.3	6.1
Emnid for SPIEGEL	Sep 1976	N/A	49	41	8	2	—	8
Emnid for SPIEGEL	Aug 1976	N/A	48	43	7	2	—	5
Emnid for SPIEGEL	Jul 1976	N/A	47	44	8	1	—	3
Emnid for SPIEGEL	Jun 1976	N/A	51	41	8	0	—	10
Allensbach	Nov/Dec 1975	N/A	50.7	39.7	8.6	1.0	—	10.0
Infratest	Nov/Dec 1975	N/A	47	40	11	2	—	7
Emnid	Nov/Dec 1975	N/A	45	43	10	2	—	2
1972 federal election	19 Nov 1972	–	44.9	45.8	8.4	0.6	8.9	0.9

== Results ==
Party	Party-list			Constituency			Seats			
Party	Votes	%	Seats	Votes	%	Seats	Elected	West Berlin	Total	+/–
Social Democratic Party	16,099,019	42.56	100	16,471,321	43.70	114	214	10	224	–18
Christian Democratic Union	14,367,302	37.99	96	14,423,157	38.26	94	190	11	201	+15
Christian Social Union	4,027,499	10.65	13	4,008,514	10.63	40	53	0	53	+5
Free Democratic Party	2,995,085	7.92	39	2,417,683	6.41	0	39	1	40	–2
National Democratic Party	122,661	0.32	0	136,028	0.36	0	0	0	0	0
German Communist Party	118,581	0.31	0	170,855	0.45	0	0	0	0	0
Communist Party of Germany (AO)	22,714	0.06	0	8,822	0.02	0	0	0	0	New
Action Group of Independent Germans	22,202	0.06	0	19,490	0.05	0	0	0	0	New
Communist League of West Germany	20,018	0.05	0	21,414	0.06	0	0	0	0	New
European Workers' Party	6,811	0.02	0	3,177	0.01	0	0	0	0	New
Christian Bavarian People's Party	6,720	0.02	0	4,876	0.01	0	0	0	0	New
International Marxist Group	4,759	0.01	0	2,037	0.01	0	0	0	0	New
Action Community Fourth Party	4,723	0.01	0	2,636	0.01	0	0	0	0	New
5%-Block	2,940	0.01	0	985	0.00	0	0	0	0	New
Independent Workers' Party	765	0.00	0	499	0.00	0	0	0	0	New
United Left	701	0.00	0	217	0.00	0	0	0	0	New
Right and Freedom Party				227	0.00	0	0	0	0	New
Independents and voter groups				3,706	0.01	0	0	0	0	0
Total	37,822,500	100.00	248	37,695,644	100.00	248	496	22	518	0
Valid votes	37,822,500	99.10		37,695,644	98.77					
Invalid/blank votes	343,253	0.90		470,109	1.23					
Total votes	38,165,753	100.00		38,165,753	100.00					
Registered voters/turnout	42,058,015	90.75		42,058,015	90.75					
Source: Bundeswahlleiter

=== Results by state ===
==== Constituency seats ====
State	Total seats	Seats won		
State	Total seats	SPD	CDU	CSU
Baden-Württemberg	36	4	32	
Bavaria	44	4		40
Bremen	3	3		
Hamburg	8	8		
Hesse	22	17	5	
Lower Saxony	30	18	12	
North Rhine-Westphalia	73	45	28	
Rhineland-Palatinate	16	6	10	
Saarland	5	3	2	
Schleswig-Holstein	11	6	5	
Total	248	114	94	40

==== List seats ====
State	Total seats	Seats won			
State	Total seats	SPD	CDU	FDP	CSU
Baden-Württemberg	35	22	6	7	
Bavaria	44	25		6	13
Bremen	2		2		
Hamburg	6		5	1	
Hesse	25	5	16	4	
Lower Saxony	32	11	16	5	
North Rhine-Westphalia	75	25	38	12	
Rhineland-Palatinate	15	7	6	2	
Saarland	3	1	2		
Schleswig-Holstein	11	4	5	2	
Total	248	100	96	39	13

== Aftermath ==
The coalition between the SPD and the FDP remained in government, with Helmut Schmidt as Chancellor. Between the "sister parties" of CDU and Bavarian CSU there emerged a critical conflict, as the CSU leader Franz Josef Strauß wanted to break both the united Bundestag group of the parties and the agreement not to compete against each other in any Land. Later, this attack was withdrawn, while Strauß became candidate for chancellor for the 1980 elections.
