= 1976 Baden-Württemberg state election =

State election in Germany

- 4 April 1976

All 121 seats in the Landtag of Baden-Württemberg 61 seats needed for a majority
- Turnout: 4,596,810 (75.45%) ▼4.55%
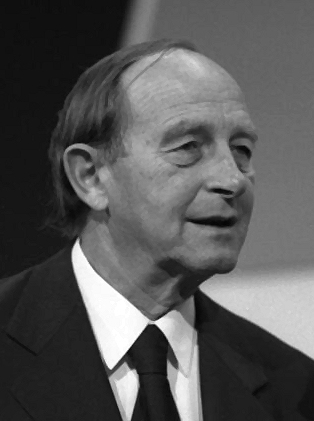

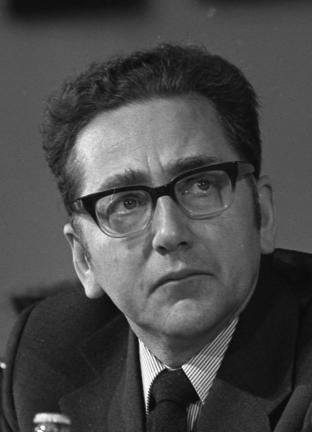

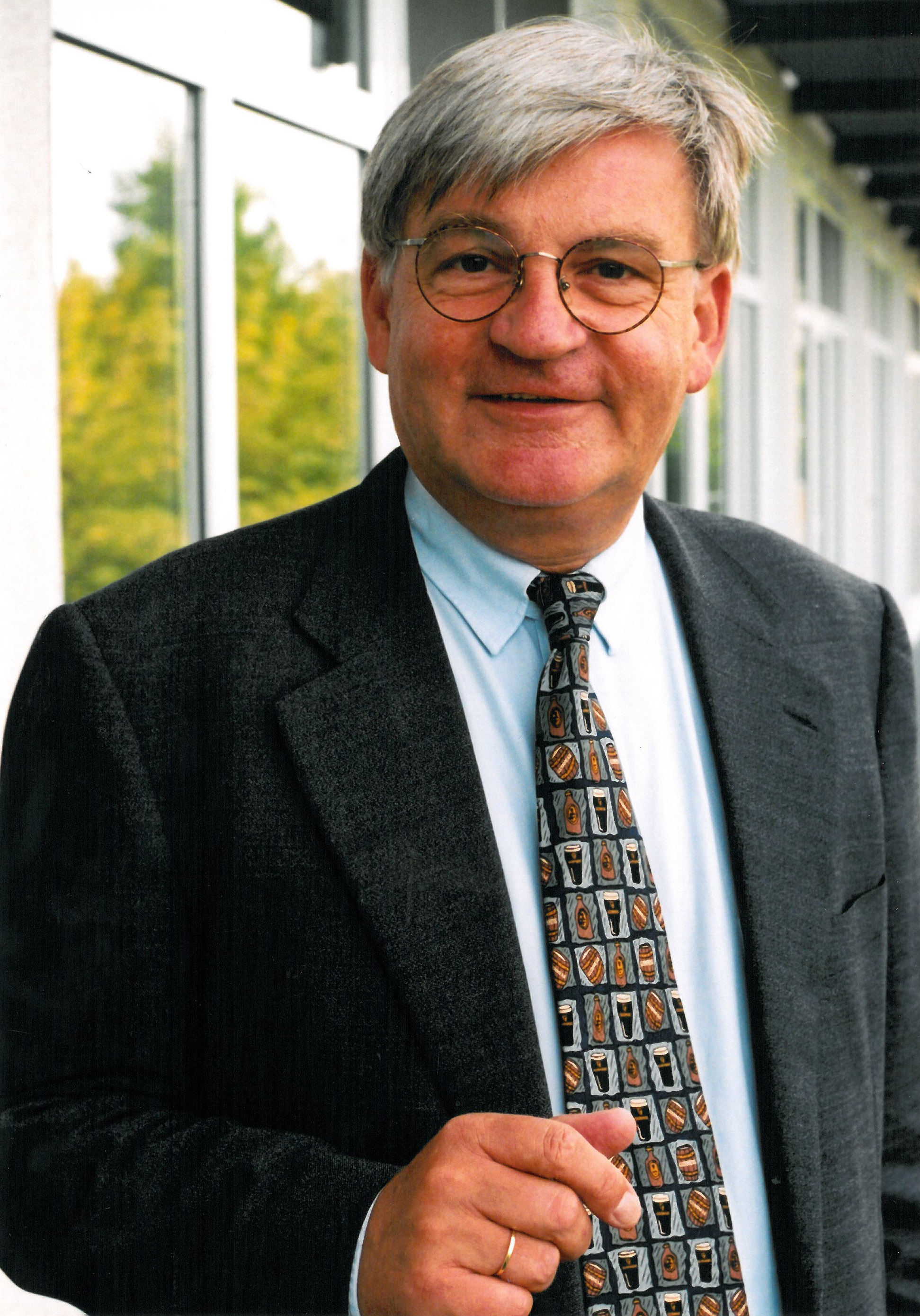
	First party	Second party	Third party
Leader	Hans Filbinger	Erhard Eppler	Jürgen Morlok
Party	CDU	SPD	FDP
Last election	65 seats, 52.92%	45 seats, 37.56%	10 seats, 8.94%
Seats won	71	41	9
Seat change	▲6	▼4	▼1
Popular vote	2,573,147	1,510,012	353,754
Percentage	56.72%	33.29%	7.80%
Swing	▲3.80%	▼4.27%	▼1.14%
- Results for the single-member constituencies
Minister-President before election
Hans Filbinger
CDU
Elected Minister-President
Hans Filbinger
CDU

The 1976 Baden-Württemberg state election was held on 4 April 1976 to elect the members of the 6th Landtag of Baden-Württemberg. The incumbent Christian Democratic Union (CDU) government under Minister-President Hans Filbinger was re-elected, retaining its majority.

== Parties ==
The table below lists parties represented in the previous Landtag of Baden-Württemberg.

Name		Ideology	Leader(s)	1972 result	
Name		Ideology	Leader(s)	Votes (%)	Seats
CDU	Christian Democratic Union of Germany; Christlich Demokratische Union Deutschlands	Christian democracy	Hans Filbinger	52.92%	65 / 120
SPD	Social Democratic Party of Germany; Sozialdemokratische Partei Deutschlands	Social democracy	Erhard Eppler	37.56%	45 / 120
FDP	Free Democratic Party; Freie Demokratische Partei	Classical liberalism	Jürgen Morlok	8.94%	10 / 120

== Results ==
Summary of the 4 April 1976 election results for the Landtag of Baden-Württemberg
Party	Votes	%	+/-	Seats	+/-	Seats %
Christian Democratic Union (CDU)	2,573,147	56.72	▲3.80	71	▲6	58.68
Social Democratic Party (SPD)	1,510,012	33.29	▼4.27	41	▼4	33.88
Free Democratic Party (FDP)	353,754	7.80	▼1.14	9	▼1	7.44
National Democratic Party (NPD)	42,927	0.95	New	0	±0	0
European Federalist Party	29,580	0.65	New	0	±0	0
German Communist Party (DKP)	18,762	0.46	0.00	0	±0	0
Communist League	5,751	0.13	New	0	±0	0
Kommunistische Partei Deutschlands (Aufbauorganisation)	296	0.00	New	0	±0	0
German Peace Union	557	0.00	0.00	0	±0	0
European Workers' Party	191	0.00	New	0	±0	0
Justice Party	178	0.00	New	0	±0	0
Spartacusbund	94	0.00	New	0	±0	0
Total	4,536,515	98.69		121	▲1	
Invalid votes	60,295	1.31				
Voter turnout	4,596,810	75.45	▼4.55			
