= Jungle World =

German left-wing weekly newspaper

- Type: Weekly newspaper
- Format: Berliner
- Owner: Jungle World Verlags GmbH
- Founded: 1997
- Political alignment: Left-Wing
- Headquarters: Berlin
- Circulation: 16,000 (2020)
- Price: €4.00
- Website: jungle.world

Jungle World is a left-wing weekly newspaper based in Germany published in Berlin and in Austria.

== History ==
Initially founded in 1997 by striking editors of the German left-wing daily Junge Welt, it became independent after only a few issues. Today, it is published by the Jungle World Verlags GmbH in the names of over thirty current and former authors, editors, and staff as well as friends of the newspaper.

Jungle World is known for its anti-nationalist and cosmopolitan positions reflect those of the "undogmatic left" in Germany. The articles are published in the weekly's online edition in the days after publication. According to the German Federal Ministry of Family Affairs, the newspaper regularly picks up questions of the far left anti-German spectrum, and contains references to far left activities. The newspaper has regular writers who are anti-Germans.

Since its re-launch on its tenth anniversary in 2007, Jungle World features two sections: the outer concerns mostly political news and analysis on German and international matters, as well as debate, the inner section provides cultural and literary criticism, biting satire, and a longer piece in the form of a dossier. Since April 2008 its website has also run a series of blogs.

On the occasion of the 20th anniversary of this newspaper, its 1,000th edition was published on 7 June 2017, this edition was written entirely by former employees.

== Positions ==
A founder and co-editor of Jungle World referred to the paper in 2007 as "explicitly anti-anti-Zionist, anti-anti-Semitic, and anti-anti-American". Activists who call themselves anti-imperialists have been accused of being nationalistic by the newspaper.

== Design ==
The print edition is divided into a 20-page main section in Berliner format and a 24-page magazine section in half Berliner.

The fonts used by Jungle World are Floris JW and Floris Text, which were designed especially for the newspaper by typographer and typeface designer Lucas de Groot.

A new design was introduced with the 7th edition in 2016. Among other things, the front page was made clearer and the main section was changed from three to five columns. The logo of the print edition is a large "J".

== Circulation and distribution ==
According to the newspaper's information, the newspaper was published nationwide on a weekly basis in 2015 with a circulation of 16,000 copies, with the paid circulation in 2011 being 11,585 copies, of which around 6,300 were subscriptions. These are crucial for financing the newspaper.

Jungle World is distributed by the Carnivora publishing service and is available at numerous train stations as well as in selected kiosks and bookstores in Germany and Austria.

== Reception ==
Texts published in Jungle World are regularly presented in the feuilleton overview Heute in the feuilletons of Perlentaucher and Spiegel-Online.

When, after the terrorist attacks of 11 September 2001, Jungle World also published articles approving of military action by Western states against al-Qaida or the Taliban, the newspaper was criticized by Alfred Schobert in the anti-militarist magazine Graswurzelrevolution. The newspaper received a large amount of criticism among the left in Germany due to its opaque stance on the upcoming Iraq War in 2002 and its criticism of then-Chancellor Gerhard Schröder's use of anti-war politics in his re-election campaign of the same year. A strong point of contention among the German left is its pro-Israel position.

Authors who belong to the anti-German political spectrum also regularly have their say. On the one hand, Jungle World has been criticized by the magazine Bahamas, which is generally classified as "anti-German". On the other hand, the Brandenburg Office for the Protection of the Constitution categorized the newspaper as one of the most important publications of the anti-German milieu.
