= Matthias Küntzel =

German political scientist, author and historian (born 1955)

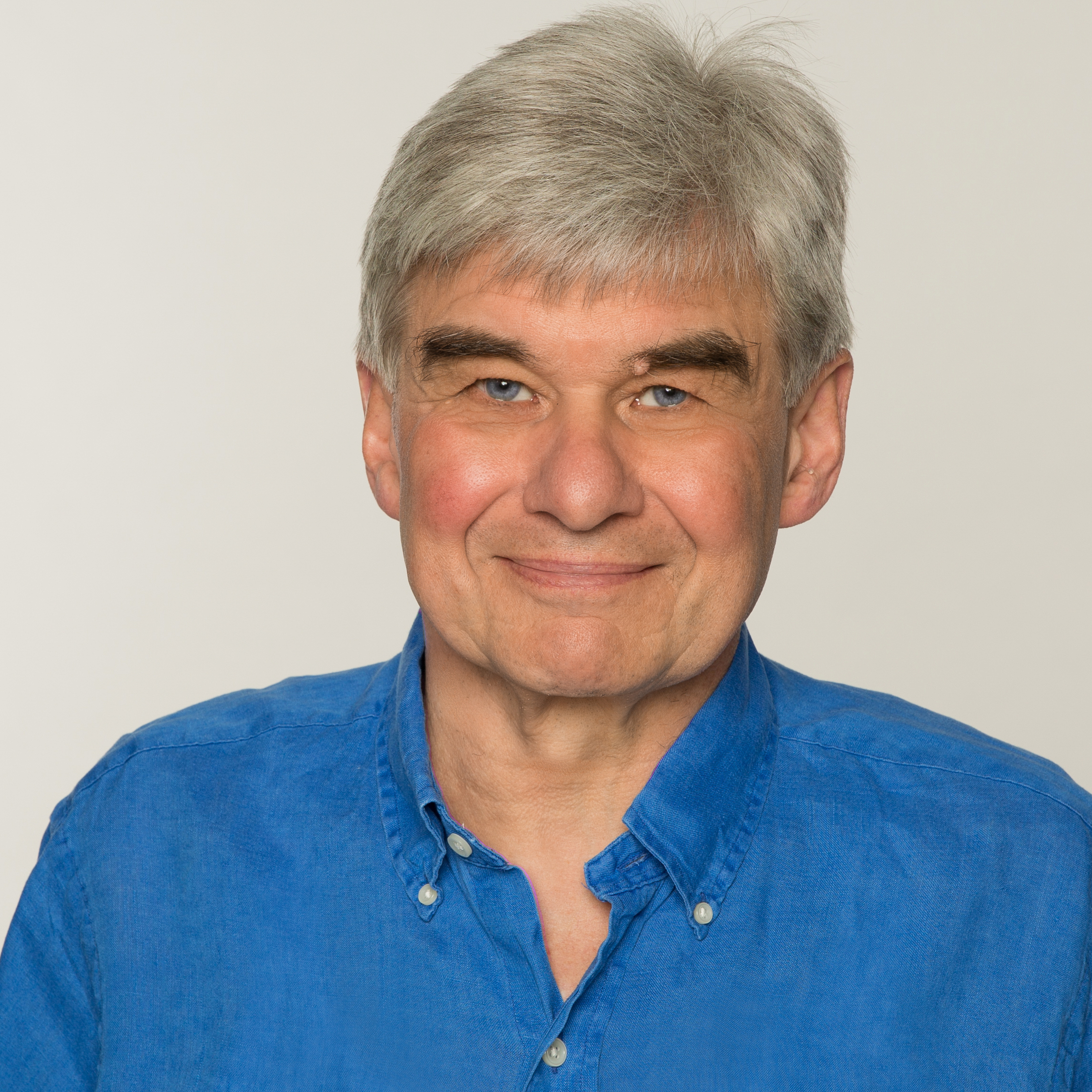
- Born: 1955 (age 70–71)
- Board member of: United Against Nuclear Iran (UANI), German Council on Foreign Relations
- Awards: Paul Ehrlich-Günther K. Schwerin Human Rights Award (2011); Theodor Lessing Prize (2022)

Academic background
- Education: University of Hamburg
- Thesis: Bonn & the Bomb. German Politics and the Nuclear Option (1991)

Academic work
- Discipline: Political science, History
- Sub-discipline: Antisemitism, Islamism, International relations
- Institutions: Hebrew University of Jerusalem; German Green Party (Bundestag caucus); Technical college in Hamburg
- Main interests: Antisemitism in Islamic thinking, Islamism and National Socialism, Iran, Western Middle East policy

Matthias Küntzel (born 1955) is a German political scientist and historian. He was an external research associate at the Vidal Sassoon Center for the Study of Antisemitism (SICSA) at the Hebrew University of Jerusalem from 2004 to 2015. Currently, he is a member of the German Council on Foreign Relations DGAP and of the advisory board of UANI (United Against Nuclear Iran).

== Career ==
From 1984 to 1988, Küntzel served as a senior advisor for the German Green Party caucus in the Bundestag. He was member of the Communist League (Kommunistischer Bund, KB) and part of the Anti-Germans movement. After the KB split in 1991, he belonged to the Anti-German editorial minority, which thereafter called itself Gruppe K and published the Bahamas magazine. Between 1992 and 2021 he held a tenured part-time position as a teacher of political science at a technical college in Hamburg, Germany.

In 1991, he received his doctorate in Political Science at the University of Hamburg. His thesis Bonn & the Bomb. German Politics and the Nuclear Option (London: Pluto Press) was published in English in 1995.

Since 2001, his main field of research and writing have been anti-Semitism in current Islamic thinking, Islamism, Islamism and National Socialism, Iran, German and Western policies towards the Middle East and Iran. His essays and articles have been translated into sixteen languages and published inter alia in The New Republic, The Wall Street Journal, The Israel Journal of Foreign Affairs, The Weekly Standard, Telos, Policy Review, The Jerusalem Post, Der Standard, Spiegel Online, Die Welt, Die Zeit and Internationale Politik.

== Work ==
In 2003, he delivered the keynote address at the "Conference on "Genocide and Terrorism – Probing the Mind of the Perpetrator". 20 March 2003. at Yale University. In 2005, he discovered antisemitic tracts at the Iranian stands at the Frankfurt Book Fair, an incident he wrote about in the Wall Street Journal. In 2007, he co-founded the German section of the Scholars for Peace in the Middle East and was a member of its board until March 2013. According to its own statement, SPME aims to counter antisemitism, anti-Zionism and anti-Israelism through “information and persuasion work” conducted over the long term.

In 2007, Telos Press (New York, NY) published his book Jihad and Jew-Hatred. Islamism, Nazism and the Roots of 9/11. In 2008, he presented "Jihad and Jew-Hatred in the USA" at numerous universities (Stanford University, Columbia University, UCLA, UC-Santa Cruz, UC-Irvine, SUNY-Buffalo, University of Maine, and the Cooper Union).

He also spoke at conferences organized inter alia by the American Enterprise Institute, the Israel Project, the Anti-Defamation League, and the Jewish Institute for National Security Affairs, and at the "Global Forum For Combating Antisemitism" at Israel's Ministry of Foreign Affairs. He participated in an international academic workshop on "Antisemitism in the 21st Century: Manifestations, Implications and Consequences", organized by the Center for Advanced Holocaust Studies of the United States Holocaust Museum. In December 2008, Küntzel’s criticism of the Berlin Center for Research on Antisemitism triggered a controversy over the equation of hostility toward Jews with hostility toward Muslims.

In 2009, he spoke at the "London Conference on Combating Antisemitism", organized by the Foreign and Commonwealth Office of the United Kingdom, and published his book The Germans and Iran: The Past and Present of a Fateful Friendship (German publisher: Wolf Jobst Siedler, Berlin). 2012 the Persian translation of this book by Michael Mobasheri was published in Cologne-Germany (Forough-Publishing Cologne). In 2010 he became a guest commentator on Germany's main public radio station, Deutschlandradio Kultur, and addressed the "Second Conference of the Interparliamentary Coalition on Combating Antisemitism" in Ottawa, Canada. In 2011, he received the ADL's Ehrlich-Schwerin Human Rights Prize and spoke at the international scholars conference on "Resurgent Antisemitism: Global Perspectives", organized by the Institute for the Study of Contemporary Antisemitism at Indiana University.

In 2012, he spoke on behalf of the Henry Jackson Society to Britain's House of Commons on the 70th anniversary of the Wannsee Conference, and at the Konrad Adenauer Foundation in Brussels on the current meaning of the Auschwitz day of remembrance. He was the main speaker at a rally against the award of the Adorno Award to Judith Butler, held in front of St. Paul's Church in Frankfurt. The Germans and Iran was republished in Persian Translation by Michael Mobasheri. He also published Germany, Iran and the Bomb (LIT, Münster), which was also a reply to Günter Grass.

His book "Nazis and der Nahe Osten. Wie der islamische Antisemitismus entstand" (Nazis and the Middle East: How Islamic antisemitism came into being) was published in 2019. According to the reviewer Philip Henning Küntzel has become the most important German voice on this topic. For Küntzel a different position than pro-Israel is impossible. In his book Küntzel according the review selectively displays how NS-propaganda spread in Arabic countries, while and he ignores the many Arabic enemies of the Nazis. The influence of colonialism in the region is not a topic of the book either. However Hennig writes the book an overdue contribution to the awareness of a topic which plays too little a role in scientific and general public discourse. In 2023, Routledge published "Nazis, Islamic Antisemitism and the Middle East. The Arab War against Israel and the Aftershocks of World War II", an expanded English version of "Nazis und der Nahe Osten“.

== Reception ==
=== Supportive reviews ===
Küntzel's writings have been positively received by scholars and authors such as Henryk M. Broder, Jeffrey Herf, Robert S. Wistrich, Walter Laqueur, Bassam Tibi and Pierre-André Taguieff. His book Jihad and Jew-Hatred was also positively reviewed in The Washington Times. Jeffrey Goldberg reviewing the book in the New York Times called it a "bracing, even startling, book" and an "invaluable contribution" about an explosion of anti-Jewish hatred. "Küntzel makes a bold and consequential argument: the dissemination of European models of anti-Semitism among Muslims was not haphazard, but an actual project of the Nazi Party, meant to turn Muslims against Jews and Zionism. [...] Küntzel marshals impressive evidence to back his case, but he sometimes oversimplifies." J. Peter Pham described the book in American Foreign Policy Interests as a “salutary reminder”, while Amnon Lord praised it in Jewish Policy Studies Review as “perhaps the most important work written in the wake of 9/11”. In Deutschlandfunk, Ralph Gerstenberg described The Germans and Iran: The Past and Present of a Fateful Friendship as "worth reading and illuminating". Handelsblatt wrote that the abundance of facts would "not only impress but also unsettle any interested reader", while Wolfgang G. Schwanitz praised the book in the Süddeutsche Zeitung as "dramatic" and "stirring".

=== Negative reviews ===
"Jihad and Jew-Hatred in the USA" was criticized by Gilbert Achcar as "a fantasy-based narrative pasted together out of secondary sources and thirdhand reports; it aims to demonstrate that there is a direct line of descent from Amin al-Husseini and Hassan al-Banna through Gamal Abdel-Nasser to Osama bin Laden." Alexander Flores has critiqued the book for lacking context about Palestinians' relationship to Zionism: "he draws a grotesquely distorted picture of the general strike and subsequent rebellion of the Palestinians from 1936 to 1939. According to this picture, the rebellion was brought about by the machinations of the mufti who just followed his lust for power and his anti-Semitic leanings and who already at that time colluded with the Nazis. The real background of the revolt, the Palestinians' apprehension at enhanced Jewish immigration, accelerated Zionist upbuilding and the possible loss of their homeland, is absent from this picture." Bernhard Schmid criticized Küntzel’s analysis of Islamism in analyse & kritik, writing that it consisted "above all in reading traits of German National Socialism into Islamism" and that Küntzel did not undertake the effort to analyze Islamism together with its social context. René Wildangel counted Küntzel among authors who imputed "collective sympathies for the Nazis" to Arabs and, for lack of knowledge of Arabic and regional sources, took one-sided positions. Katajun Amirpur judged on Deutschlandradio that Küntzel was demonstrably wrong in some cases to such an extent that it was difficult for the reader to believe him where he might be right. Küntzel published a reply, followed by a response from Amirpur on NEFAIS (Network of Specialist Journalists on the Islamic World) and a rejoinder by Küntzel. Fahimeh Farsaie wrote in der Freitag of a "distortion of facts" and stated that the author wanted at all costs to recognize "the grimace of the Nazis" in Islamism. The German Islamic studies scholar Michael Kiefer criticized what he called an "alarmist tone", "terminological missteps" and allegedly false Nazi comparisons and exaggerations in Küntzel’s work.

Küntzel’s adverse assessment of the Kosovo War was criticized for being blind to what the Kosovo Albanian population would have had to endure without NATO’s victory over Serbia. Despite his analysis that was at times astute, the book was described as a "left-dogmatic political reader and ideological manifesto".

=== Controversy over cancelled lecture at the University of Leeds ===
On 14 March 2007 Küntzel was due to address University of Leeds in England on the topic ‘Hitler’s Legacy: Islamic Antisemitism in the Middle East.’ The university's student Islamic society complained about what they called the lecture's "provocative" title and the university removed the words "Hitler" and "Islamic" with the title amended to read: "The Nazi Legacy: The Export of Anti-Semitism to the Middle East." However, several hours before the talk was due to take place, the talk was unexpectedly cancelled due to "security concerns," following protest e-mails from some of the university's Muslim students claiming the lecture was an "open racist attack". Küntzel and the university’s German department described it as censorship and a sell-out of academic freedom.

Küntzel said he had given similar addresses (at Yale University, as well as universities in Jerusalem and Vienna) around the world and there had been no problems. "I know this is sometimes a controversial topic," he said, "but I am accustomed to that and I have the ability to calm people down. It's not a problem for me at all. My impression was that they wanted to avoid the issue in order to keep the situation calm. My feeling is that this is a kind of censorship." Dr. Küntzel also said that the contents of emails described to him did not overtly threaten violence but "they were very, very strongly worded". He added: "It's stupid, because I also talk about Christian anti-semitism." Members of the German department at Leeds accused the university of "selling-out" academic freedom.

== Awards and honors ==
In December 2007, Küntzel won the London Book Festival for his book Jihad and Jew-Hatred: Islamism, Nazism, and the Roots of 9/11. In May 2008, Jihad and Jew-Hatred received the Gold Medal in the religion category from the Independent Publisher Book Awards. In May 2008, Jihad and Jew-Hatred received the Gold Medal in the religion category from the Independent Publisher Book Awards.In 2011, Matthias Küntzel was presented with the Anti-Defamation-League's (ADL) Paul Ehrlich-Günther K. Schwerin Human Rights Award.

In 2011, Matthias Küntzel was (together with Colin Meade) the recipient of the Best Book Review Award of the Journal for the Study of Antisemitism.

In 2022, the German-Israeli Society in Hanover awarded him the Theodor Lessing Prize for enlightened thinking and acting.

== Books ==
- Nazis, Islamic Antisemitism and the Middle East. The Arab War against Israel and the Aftershocks of World War II, Routledge 2024
- Nazis und der Nahe Osten. Wie der islamische Antisemitismus entstand, Hentrich & Hentrich 2019
- Germany and Iran: From the Aryan Axis to the Nuclear Threshold, New York, 2014.
- Deutschland, Iran und die Bombe, , LIT Verlag 2012.
- آلمانی‌ها و ایران- تاریخ گذشته و معاصر یک دوستی بدفرجام ترجمه مایکل مبشری (Germany and Iran: The Past and Contemporary History of an Unhappy Friendship) 2012. Paris: Khavaran. ISBN 978-3-943147-18-6. OCLC 829906934. Translated by Michael Mobasheri.
- Die Deutschen und der Iran, wjs-Verlag 2009.
- Islamischer Antisemitismus und deutsche Politik, LIT Verlag 2007
- Jihad and Jew-Hatred: Islamism, Nazism and the Roots of 9/11, New York, 2007.
- Djihad und Judenhaß: über den neuen antijüdischen Krieg, Ça Ira, Freiburg, 2002
- Der Weg in den Krieg. Deutschland, die Nato und das Kosovo (The Road to War. Germany, Nato and the Kosovo), Elefanten Press, Berlin, 2000
- Goldhagen und die deutsche Linke oder: Die Gegenwart des Holocaust (Goldhagen and the German Left or: The Presence of the Holocaust), ed. Matthias Küntzel, Ulrike Becker, Klaus Thörner et al., Elefanten Press, Berlin, 1997
- Bonn & the Bomb: German politics and the nuclear option, Transnational Institute (TNI), Pluto Press, London; Boulder, Colorado, 1995.
- Bonn und die Bombe: deutsche Atomwaffenpolitik von Adenauer bis Brandt, Campus-Verlag, Frankfurt/Main; New York, 1992
