= Communist League (West Germany) =

1971–1991 political party in northern Germany

The Communist League (German: Kommunistischer Bund, KB) was a radical left-wing organisation active in West Germany from 1971 until 1991. The KB emerged from the protests of 1968 and initially had a Maoist orientation. Later in the 1980s it became a leading organisation of the "undogmatic left" (undogmatische Linke). It was one of several competing minor communist groups in West Germany collectively known as the "K groups".

== History ==
The KB was created by the merger of the Hamburg Socialist Workers' and Apprentices' Center (Sozialistisches Arbeiter- und Lehrlingszentrum; SALZ) with the Communist Workers' Confederation (Kommunistischer Arbeiterbund, KAB) of Hamburg, SALZ Bremerhaven, SALZ Frankfurt, the Communist Construction Group (Kommunistische Aufbaugruppe, KAG) Oldenburg and the Communist League/Marxists-Leninists (Kommunistischer Bund/Marxisten-Leninisten, KB/ML) in Flensburg and Eutin.

The KB originated from the late sixties' youth movement, with early Marxist-Leninist forces that developed from the banned Communist Party of Germany (KPD) like the small cadre group KAB Hamburg led by Knut Mellenthin merging with the SALZ that had emerged from the Hamburg apprentices' movement. They were joined by a majority of the Communist League of High School Students (KOB), but only a minority of the SALZ's sympathisers among university students while most of them joined the Socialist Students' Group that became part of the Communist League of West Germany (KBW), a rival Maoist organisation. This split can be seen as a reason for the bitter enmity between KB and KBW that competed for a similar circle of supporters, first in Northern Germany and after c. 1975 in all of West Germany.

== Structure ==
The KB dissociated itself strictly from the Communist League of West Germany (KBW) and the Communist Party of Germany/Marxists–Leninists (KPD/ML) and used less dogmatic language than the two latter groups. The Hamburg Green-Alternative List (GAL or AL) was essentially supported by KB activists after 1984. With the rise of the GAL, KB lost its importance. A spin-off was the Group Z that later joined The Greens and included many future Green politicians like Thomas Ebermann, Rainer Trampert, and Jürgen Trittin.

The KB's newspaper Arbeiterkampf (AK; "workers' struggle") reached its highest circulation numbers during the heyday of anti-nuclear protests in the late 1970s. At this time, the KB had an estimated 2,500 members, 1500 of them in Hamburg. Arbeiterkampf differed from other left-wing parties' papers as it not only propagated the KB's party line, but was open to controversial discussions and presented a variety of standpoints. Therefore AK played the role of a left-wing alternative press in Hamburg.

In the field of legal assistance, the KB briefly cooperated with the Hamburg Rote Hilfe ("Red Aid"), but stopped collaboration as KB (unlike the Rote Hilfe) distanced itself clearly from the Red Army Faction's (RAF) terrorist violence. Instead, KB started its own legal office, called "Initiative Committee Workers' Assistance Hamburg" (Initiativkomitee Arbeiterhilfe Hamburg, IKAH).

== Positions ==
The theoretical core of KB's positions–and a pivotal difference vis-à-vis other "K" groups' ideologies–was the assumption of a "fascisation" of the West German state and society. While other Marxist–Leninist groups assumed that the growing economic crisis of capitalism would lead to a leftist politicization of the population and a revolutionary mass movement, the KB held the view that—because of Germany's historical peculiarities—the crisis would rather trigger a swing to the right and lead to a resurgence of fascism. This view was rebuked as "pessimistic" and "defeatist" by rivaling leftists.

Another distinction from other Maoist organizations was that the KB conceded that the Soviet Union and its allies had a rather progressive role on a global scale (despite criticism of their domestic policies) and rejected the Chinese theory of "Soviet social imperialism". Thus the KB defended the existence of East Germany, while many other Maoists demanded German reunification. It strongly rejected rival organisations' line of "fatherland defencism" against the purported "social imperialism". On the contrary, in 1972 the KB accused West Germany of seeking domination over its European neighbours under the guise of European integration. The KB claimed that the West German-dominated European Economic Community (EEC) was designed to antagonise Eastern European and developing countries of the Global South (which they called the "Tricont") as well as rivalry with the United States. KB's claim of the "particular level of aggressiveness" of West German imperialism was a significant determiner of KB's fascisation theory.

After an intensive discussion of China's foreign policy, the KB renounced its former ideological reference model. Moreover, the group criticised the internal developments in China after Mao's death as a "right-wing coup".

== Schisms and decline ==
Over the 1980s differences within the shrinking group became manifest, first concerning the Arab–Israeli conflict. The Anti-Zionism of large portions of the radical left, including parts of the KB, that even compared Israel's policies with those of the Nazis (AK once headlined: "Final Solution to the Palestinian Question", alluding to the Nazi terminology of the Final Solution to the Jewish Question) was opposed by some, particularly by Jewish KB members. KB's Frankfurt chapter was especially vocal in this position, warning of subtextual antisemitism within the left.

After the 1989 Peaceful Revolution in East Germany and in view of the looming German reunification, the differences within the KB turned out to be irreconcilable. The majority of KB concluded that given the inevitability of German reunification, it should focus on the social question arising from the restoration of capitalism in East Germany, and sought collaboration with the East German Party of Democratic Socialism (PDS). The minority, on the other hand, went for fundamental opposition against the restoration of the German nation state, participated in the "Radical Left Alliance", and supported the "Germany Never Again" demonstration in Frankfurt in May 1990. This minority formed the Gruppe K publishing the anti-German Bahamas magazine.

== Dissolution ==
The KB disbanded in April 1991. The Arbeiterkampf newspaper continued to be published monthly until mid-1992, serving as a last link between the two opposing currents of KB. Then it renamed itself to analyse & kritik ("Analysis and Criticism"), keeping the acronym ak. It carried on the pro-PDS line of KB's former majority. It still exists, with younger editors, having evolved towards a pluralist debate organ of the undogmatic radical left without party affiliation.

== Notable former members ==
- Angelika Beer, joined The Greens in 1980, chairman of Alliance 90/The Greens (2002–04), member of the Bundestag (1987–90; 1994–2002); member of the European Parliament (2004–09), joined the Pirate Party Germany in 2009
- Jürgen Elsässer, journalist for the left-wing konkret magazine 2003, then turned to radical right-wing populist positions, seeking a Third Position strategy that unites anti-imperialist leftists and anti-capitalist rightists
- Ulla Jelpke, joined the GAL/The Greens in 1981, resigned in 1990, non-partisan member of the Bundestag in the PDS's quota (1990–2002), joined the PDS in 2005, again member of the Bundestag (since 2005)
- Matthias Küntzel, political scientist and journalist, mainly publishing about Islamism, Antisemitism and Iran in German and international papers
- Hans-Georg Stümke, LGBT activist
- Rainer Trampert, co-founder of The Greens in 1980, resigned in 1990
- Jürgen Trittin, co-founder of The Greens in 1980, leader of Alliance 90/The Greens (1994–98), federal minister of the environment (1998–2005)

== Sources ==
- Michael Steffen (2002). Geschichten vom Trüffelschwein: Politik und Organisation des Kommunistischen Bundes 1971 bis 1991 (PDF). Berlin: Assoziation A. ISBN 3-935936-07-9.
