= BWK =

BWK is the abbreviation of:

- Berwick-upon-Tweed railway station, a railway station in Northumberland, England, National Rail station code
- Bol Airport or Brač Airport, an airport on the Croatian island of Brač, close to the town of Bol, IATA code
- Brandon Wheat Kings, a Western Hockey League team based in Brandon, Manitoba.
- Brian Wilson Kernighan, a computer scientist
- Brillouin–Wentzel–Kramers approximation, a method for approximating many common differential equations in physics.
- Brunswick, Georgia
- Brunswick railway station, Melbourne
- Bund Westdeutscher Kommunisten, see League of West German Communists, was a Maoist communist political organization in the Federal Republic of Germany, active between 1980 and 1995
- Cold desert climate or cool arid climate
