= REBELL =

Youth organization of the Editing Marxist–Leninist Party of Germany

REBELL Jugendverband REBELL
- Leader: Anna Vöhringer
- Founded: 1992
- Membership: ~600 (2023)
- Mother party: Marxist–Leninist Party of Germany
- Website: www.rebell.info

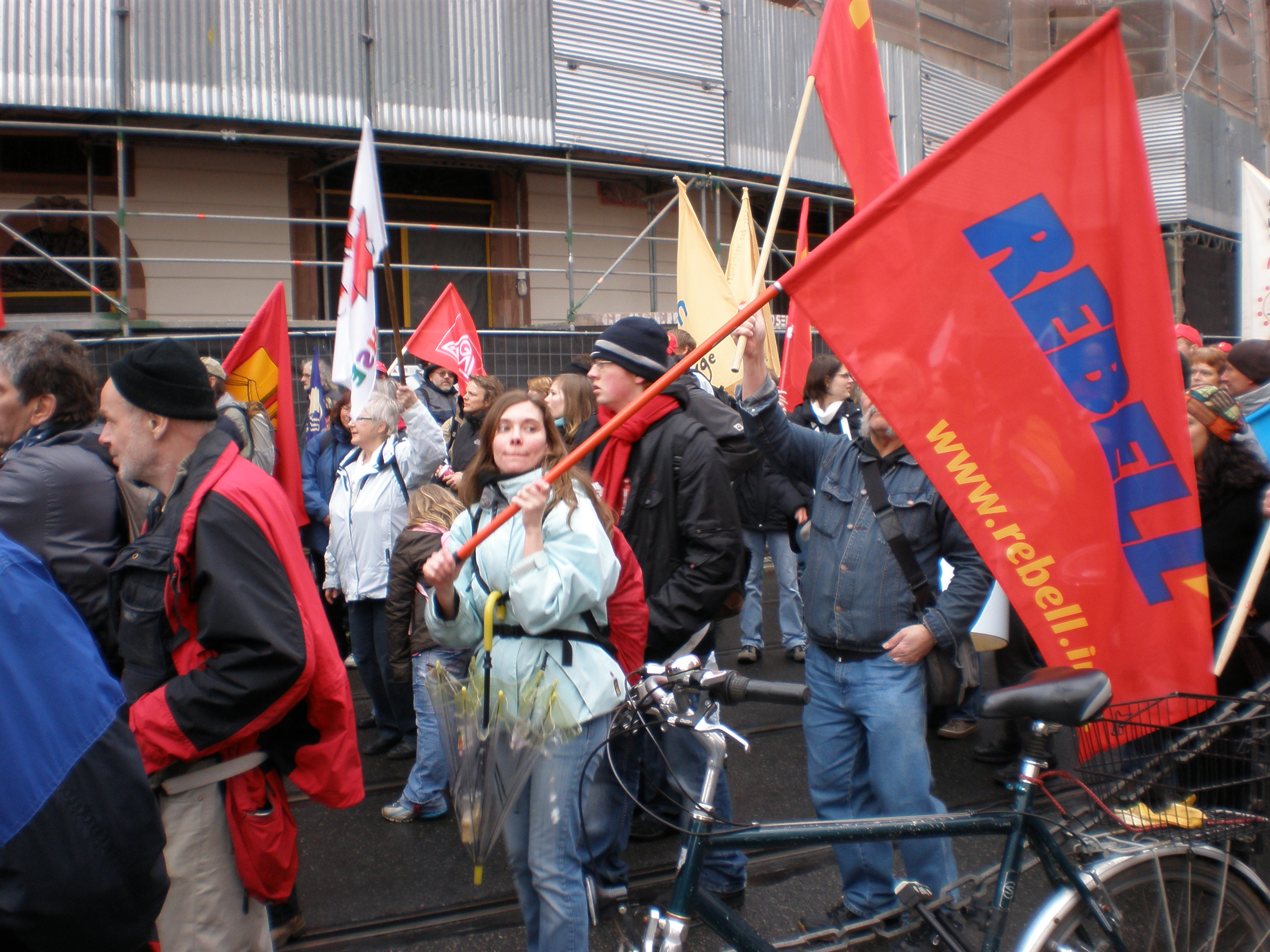
REBELL at a demonstration in Frankfurt, 2009

Jugendverband REBELL, (German: Youth League "Rebel") is a political youth organization in Germany. It is the youth wing of the Marxist–Leninist Party of Germany (MLPD). The organization was created in the summer of 1992 as a merger of the Workers' Youth Association/Marxists-Leninists (AJV/ML), the Marxist-Leninist Pupils' and Students' Association (MLSV), and the Revolutionary Youth League of Germany (RJVD), which was the predecessor to the MLDP's youth wing. The organization is active in over 60 cities in Germany. According to a report from the Federal Office for the Protection of the Constitution, REBELL has around 600 members. REBELL operates a children's wing, the Red Foxes (Rotfüchse), which is open to all children over the age of 6. The Red Foxes operate in 21 of the 60 cities REBELL is present in. REBELL also operates an annual summer camp in the Thuringian Forest.
