= Anti-German =

Anti-German may refer to:

- Anti-Germans (political current), a branch of anti-nationalist ideology in Germany
- Anti-German sentiment, suspicion or hostility towards Germany or the German people
