= Analyse & kritik =

German monthly newspaper

analyse & kritik
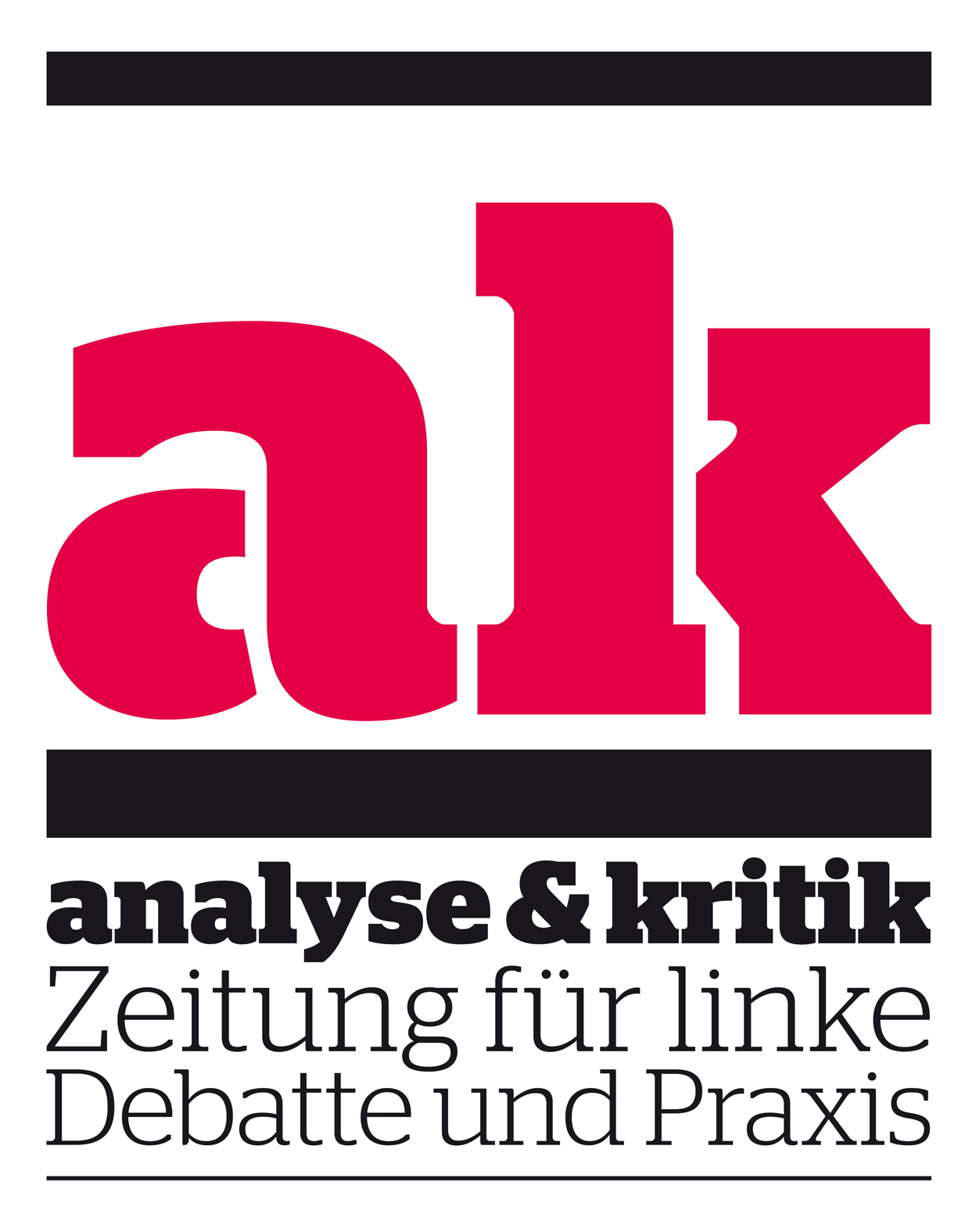
- Type: Alternative weekly
- Format: Tabloid
- Owner(s): Hannah-Maria Eberle and Jan Ole Arps
- Publisher: Verein für politische Bildung, Analyse und Kritik e. V.
- Founded: 1992
- Language: German
- Headquarters: Hamburg
- Circulation: 5400 copies
- ISSN: 0945-1153
- Website: akweb.de

analyse & kritik (ak) (full German title: "analyse & kritik – Zeitung für linke Debatten", in English, analysis & critics – Newspaper for left debates) is a monthly newspaper in Germany. Published in Hamburg it is one of the best known left magazines in Germany. It is published by the Verein für politische Bildung, Analyse und Kritik e.V., with a circulation of 5400 as of December 2019. The newspaper was founded in 1971 by the initially Maoist orientated Communist League (German: Kommunistischer Bund, KB) in West Germany.

== History ==
ak - analyse & kritik is the successor to Arbeiterkampf (AK), the newspaper of Kommunistischer Bund, which was originally a Maoist K-Group. The KB emerged from the protests of 1968. In the 1980s KB was the leading organisation of the "undogmatic left" (undogmatische Linke). The first edition of AK was published in December 1971. The newspaper remained when the KB disbanded in 1991. For a little longer than a year, until summer 1992, it was produced conjointly by both the majority and the minority fraction of the KB as an umbrella organization. From August 1992 (issue no. 345) the former majority of the KB was the sole publisher, and the newspaper received its current unaltered name: ak - analyse & kritik. In 1999, the Verein für politische Bildung, Analyse und Kritik e.V. became publisher and the newspaper focus since then has been left, but in a broader sense.

== Content ==
On the occasion of its 40-year-long existence, the newspaper was restructured in December 2011. Since then it consists of four "books": Politik, Thema, Bewegung, Gesellschaft. Thematical sections are Aktion, Deutschland, Diskussion, Gender, Geschichte, International, Kultur, Rechte, Wirtschaft & Soziales. ak publishes articles from a Marxist, feminist, radical-leftist, or reformist perspective. It covers social movements and poses them critical questions. Antifascist and anti-racist topics are discussed frequently. Every issue contains a leading article of three to five pages. The main topics of 2018 were Imperiale Lebensweise, Black History Month, 1968, China, Sexarbeit, Fußball-WM, Lagersystem, Solidarität, Klima, Novemberrevolution, Über den Wolken. Additionally, there are series of articles, the last of which was published in 2018 as a book.

== The ak-Project ==
As of 2019, the editorial team consisted of nine people, with additional staff working in graphics, layout, proofreading, IT, accounting and marketing. In total, over 350 authors from Germany and abroad have written for ak over the past four years. The editorial team has political ties to the Interventionist Left as well as numerous movements and grassroots organizations. There is a women's quota for each issue: currently, at least 35 percent of the texts should be written by women. Since December 2012, a quota of 30 percent has been in place. From April 2002 to summer 2008, a themed issue and half-yearly magazine of ak was published in 13 issues under the name Fantômas.
