= Never again Germany =

Left-wing slogan against German reunification

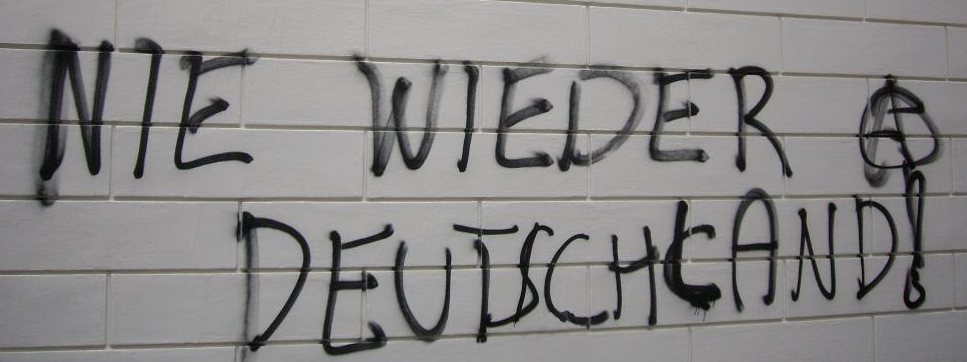
Anti German graffiti in Vienna

Never again Germany! (German: Nie wieder Deutschland) was the political motto of the "radical left" (RL), with which this nationwide alliance positioned itself from November 1989 against German reunification and its feared consequences, against German antisemitism, racism, nationalism and fascism.

The alliance was initiated in November 1989 by a group around the magazine konkret, eco-socialists and communist federation and supported by autonomous, anti-fascist activists and other left-wing groups. This reaction to the resurgence of German nationalism, neo-Nazism and historical revisionism. They warned of a "Fourth Reich" and a renewed German imperialism or world power striving.

The alliance disintegrated during the Gulf War in 1991. As a result, the German radical left split into "anti-German" and "anti-imperialists" in the dispute over the Israel-Palestine conflict and left-wing anti-Zionism.

== See also ==
- Never again
