= Communist Workers Union of Germany (1972) =

Communist party in Germany, 1972–1982

Communist Workers Union of Germany Kommunistischer Arbeiterbund Deutschlands
- Abbreviation: KABD
- Chairperson: Stefan Engel
- Founded: 5 August 1972
- Dissolved: 1982
- Split from: Communist Party of Germany/Marxists–Leninists
- Succeeded by: Marxist–Leninist Party of Germany
- Newspaper: Red Flag
- Youth wing: Revolutionary Youth League of Germany
- Membership: ~900
- Ideology: Communism; Marxism–Leninism; Anti-revisionism

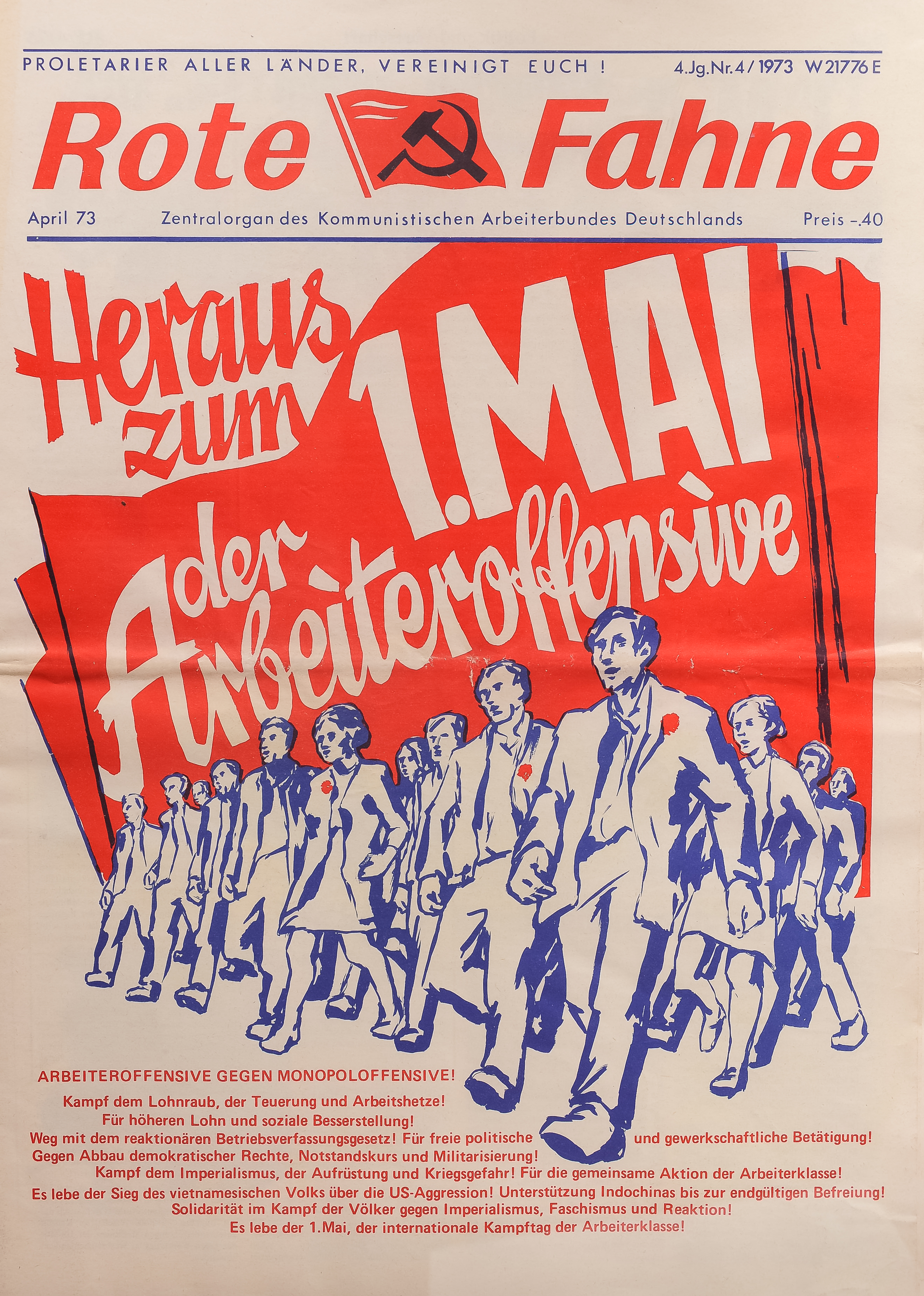
"Rote Fahne", April 1973

The Communist Workers Union of Germany (German: Kommunistischer Arbeiterbund Deutschlands, KABD) was a K-Gruppe, and a Communist party in West Germany. The party was founded on August 5, 1972, through a split from the Communist Party of Germany/Marxists–Leninists.

== History ==
The organization reportedly "fully supported" the works of Marx, Engels, Lenin, Stalin, and Mao. The declared aim of the KABD was to build "a new Marxist-Leninist party" away from the "revisionist degeneration" of the German Communist Party (DKP). Willi Dickhut, one of the initiators of the split, was expelled from the DKP in 1966.

Dickhut served as the editor of the party's theoretical organ Revolutionary Way: Problems of Marxism-Leninism (Revolutionärer Weg: Probleme des Marxismus-Leninismus). The organization's central organ was the "Red Flag" (Rote Fahne), which exists today as the MLPD's "Red Flag Magazine" (Rote Fahne Magazin). The organization's youth wing was the Revolutionary Youth League of Germany. The party's membership hovered around 900 people.

On January 17, 1981, the leadership of the federation announced the prospect of founding a party. This was realized in 1982 with the formation of the Marxist–Leninist Party of Germany (MLDP).

== Former Members ==
- Robert Kurz
- Berthold Huber
- Heide Rühle

== See also ==
- West German student movement
- K-Gruppen
