= Union of Revolutionary Workers of Austria (Marxist–Leninist) =

- Leader: Alfred Jocha
- Founded: June 22, 1968
- Dissolved: 2005
- Split from: MLPÖ
- Ideology: Communism; Marxism-Leninism
- Political position: Far-left

The Union of Revolutionary Workers of Austria (Marxist–Leninist) (German: Vereinigung Revolutionärer Arbeiter Österreichs (Marxisten-Leninisten)) was a communist group in Austria.

It was founded on June 22, 1968, created through a split of the MLPÖ. The principal leader of the VRAÖ was Alfred Jocha. It published the monthly magazine Der Kommunist 1967-1970, Für die Volksmacht (For People's Power) from 1970 to 1997 and again from 1999, and Widerspruch 1997-1999.
