= League of West German Communists =

League of West German Communists Bund Westdeutscher Kommunisten
- Abbreviation: BWK
- Founded: September 20, 1980
- Dissolved: March 1995
- Split from: Communist League of West Germany
- Merged into: PDS
- Succeeded by: AG BWK (faction)
- Headquarters: Cologne
- Newspaper: Politische Berichte
- Student wing: Kommunistische Hochschulgruppen
- Ideology: Communism; Marxism–Leninism–Maoism
- Political position: Far-left
- National affiliation: Volksfront gegen Reaktion, Faschismus und Krieg

The League of West German Communists (German: Bund Westdeutscher Kommunisten, abbreviated BWK) was a Maoist communist political organization in the Federal Republic of Germany, active between 1980 and 1995 and one of the last surviving "K Groups" established in the aftermath of the German student movement. Following the German reunification, it merged into the Party of Democratic Socialism.

== Foundation ==
BWK was founded in Mannheim on September 20, 1980, following a split from the Communist League of West Germany (KBW). The split in KBW occurred in the midst of the 1980 Bundestag election campaign. BWK was led by Jörg Detjen (de) and Martin Fochler (de). Around 600 KBW militants took part in founding BWK. BWK published the bi-weekly Politische Berichte. The organization had its headquarters in Cologne. In 1980 BWK founded the publishing house Gesellschaft für Nachrichtenerfassung und Nachrichtenverbreitung mbH (GNN) in Cologne.

== In West German politics ==
By the late 1980s, BWK was one of few remaining "K-Groups" in West Germany. As of 1988 BWK reported it was active in seven of the ten States of West Germany. Politische Berichte had a circulation of 1,300, and the pamphlet-review Nachrichtenhefte with a circulation of around 1,000. BWK was a dominant force in the Cologne-based People's Front against Reaction, Fascism and War (Volksfront gegen Reaktion, Faschismus und Krieg, de).

== Entry into PDS ==
On June 5, 1993 BWK set up a Working Group of the League of West German Communists with the Party of Democratic Socialism/Left List (Arbeitsgemeinschaft Bund Westdeutscher Kommunisten bei der PDS/LL) in Hamburg. By the end of the year, BWK was active in all West German states, setting up Working Groups in the PDS. BWK was dissolved in March 1995. Its members joined PDS. BWK was the first West German left group to dissolve itself and merge into PDS. The AG BWKs continued to exist within PDS, and later evolved into Forum of Communist Working Groups (Forum kommunistischer Arbeitsgemeinschaften). The Forum of Communist Working Groups was dissolved on December 2, 2007 and replaced in January 2008 by a new association, the Association for Political Education, Left Criticism and Communication (Verein für politische Bildung, linke Kritik und Kommunikation). The board of the new association consisted of Brigitte Wolf, Christoph Cornides, Rüdiger Lötzer, Christiane Schneider, Jörg Detjen, Martin Fochler and Alfred Küstler.
