= Willi Dickhut =

Willi Dickhut (29 April 1904 – 8 May 1992) was a German communist and cofounder of the Marxist–Leninist Party of Germany (Marxistisch–Leninistische Partei Deutschlands).

== Life ==
Willi Dickhut was born in Schalksmühle, the son of a haulage contractor and completed an apprenticeship as a fitter and turner. He was involved early in the labor movement. Dickhut participated in the 1920 general strike against the Kapp Putsch; in 1921 he joined the German Metalworkers' Federation Deutscher Metallarbeiter-Verband (DMV)) in 1926 the Communist Party of Germany (Kommunistische Partei Deutschlands (KPD)). After cleavage of Solingen branch of the DMV Dickhut was a member of the communist trade union Unity Association of Metal Workers (Einheitsverband der Metallarbeiter). In 1928–29 he spent eight months in the Soviet Union as a skilled worker in a factory making hair clippers. On his return he was more active for the Communist Party and was elected in March 1933 to the city council of Solingen.

In 1933 he was arrested and taken to "protective custody" (Schutzhaft) until 1935 by the new Nazi regime. Dickhut was temporarily interned with prison stays in the concentration camps Börgermoor and Esterwegen. During this time he was subjected to severe ill-treatment by the Gestapo. After his release he resumed his work for the enfeebled and illegal Communist Party in Solingen. In 1938 he was convicted by the Sondergericht (Special Court) in Hamm to one year and nine months in prison. This judgment was not enforced due to its "protective custody" and a nine-month detention. In August 1944 Dickhut was arrested again and faced then with a death sentence. During a heavy bombing of Solingen in November 1944, he managed to escape from prison.

After the end of World War II Dickhut was a functionary of the Communist Party again, having been Deputy Head of the personnel department within the party executive. In 1966 he was expelled from the illegal party, as he criticized the conditions in the Soviet Union. His work The restoration of capitalism in the Soviet Union was first published in 1971. In it Dickhut developed a fundamental critique of the changes in the Soviet Union after the seizure of power by Khrushchev, which he saw as a betrayal of socialism and the cause of the failure of the Soviet Union.

After his expulsion from the Communist Party, he became involved in the foundation of the Communist Party of Germany/Marxists–Leninists (KPD / ML) and promoted by the division in 1970 in a leading position the union of the resulting KPD / ML (Revolutionary Way) with the Communist Workers' Federation (ML) for Communist Workers Union of Germany (Kommunistischer Arbeiterbund Deutschlands (KABD)) 1972 who prepared the founding of the MLPD in 1982. Dickhut was, since he founded it in 1969, responsible for the theoretical organ of the party, the Revolutionärer Weg. Probleme des Marxismus-Leninismus (Revolutionary Way. Problems of Marxism-Leninism, short: Revolutionärer Weg).

Dickhut is considered within the MLPD as "Workers' theorist and visionary pioneer of genuine socialism". MLPD stresses that Dickhut's particular concern was to develop cadres that were critical, self-critical and independently thinking and acting, as a dam against dogmatism, revisionism or even a degeneration of the party.

He died on 8 May 1992 in Solingen.

Dickhut was married to Luise, born Holuch. She was a candidate for the KPD at the 1950 North Rhine-Westphalia state election. In 1966 the party expelled her together with her husband. Luise Dickhut is the author of the autobiographical book Die Horbachs: Erinnerungen für die Zukunft.

== Writings in German ==
- So war's damals (How things were then), Verlag Neuer Weg, Stuttgart 1979, ISBN 3-88021-042-X (Erster Band der Biographie)
- Der staatsmonopolistische Kapitalismus in der BRD (State-monopolistic capitalism in the GDR) (2 volumes), Verlag Neuer Weg, Stuttgart 1979, ISBN 3-88021-041-1
- Lenin, der geniale Führer des Proletariats (Lenin, the ingenious leader of the proletariat), Verlag Neuer Weg, Stuttgart 1984 (Nachdruck eines Artikels aus der Roten Fahne 2/1982)
- Krieg und Frieden und die sozialistische Revolution (War and peace and the socialist revolution), Verlag Neuer Weg, Stuttgart 1983, ISBN 3-88021-059-4
- Briefwechsel über die Fragen der Theorie und Praxis des Parteiaufbaus (Correspondence on the theory and practice of party organization), Verlag Neuer Weg, Stuttgart 1984, ISBN 3-88021-141-8
- Krisen und Klassenkampf (Crises and class struggle), Verlag Neuer Weg, Stuttgart 1985, ISBN 3-88021-136-1
- Proletarischer Widerstand gegen Faschismus und Krieg (Proletarian resistance against fascism and war) (2 volumes), Verlag Neuer Weg, Düsseldorf 1987, ISBN 3-88021-059-4
- Materialistische Dialektik und bürgerliche Naturwissenschaft (Materialist dialectic and civic science), Verlag Neuer Weg, Düsseldorf 1987, ISBN 3-88021-161-2
- Die Restauration des Kapitalismus in der Sowjetunion (The restoration of capitalism in the Soviet Union), Verlag Neuer Weg, Düsseldorf 1988, ISBN 3-88021-166-3
- Die Dialektische Einheit von Theorie und Praxis (The dialectic unity of theory and practice), Verlag Neuer Weg, Essen 1988, ISBN 3-88021-163-9
- Gewerkschaften und Klassenkampf (Trade unions and class warfare), Verlag Neuer Weg, Essen 1988, ISBN 3-88021-169-8
- Was geschah danach (What happened next), Verlag Neuer Weg, Essen 1990, ISBN 3-88021-205-8 (second volume of his biography)
- Sozialismus am Ende? (Socialism at an end?), Verlag Neuer Weg, Essen 1992, ISBN 3-88021-220-1
- Ich habe mein Leben lang gekämpft (I have fought my whole life – documentary on Dickhut's life and works), Verlag Neuer Weg, Essen 2002, ISBN 3-88021-328-3
