= Communist Party of Iceland (Marxist–Leninist) =

Communist Party of Iceland (Marxist-Leninist) Kommúnistaflokkur Íslands (marxistarnir-lenínistarnir)
- Abbreviation: KFÍ (m-l)
- Chairperson: Gunnar Andrésson
- General Secretary: Kristján Guðlaugsson
- Founded: April 1976
- Dissolved: 1979
- Preceded by: Kommúnistasamtökin marxistarnir-lenínistarnir
- Merged into: Kommúnistasamtökunum
- Newspaper: Stéttabaráttan
- Ideology: Communism; Marxism–Leninism; Maoism; Anti-revisionism; Hoxhaism
- Political position: Far-left

Communist Party of Iceland (Marxist–Leninist) (in Icelandic: Kommúnistaflokkur Íslands (m-l)), was a political party in Iceland. It was established in April 1976 by 30 delegates. Initially known as Communist Movement M-L (Kommúnistahreyfingin M-L; KHML), from 1972 until 1976 Kommúnistasamtökin marxistarnir-lenínistarnir (KSML). Published Stéttabaráttan (Class Struggle). Publication was initiated in 1972 and ceased in 1980. Chairman was Gunnar Andrésson and General Secretary Kristján Guðlaugsson.

The party was linked to the Swedish, KPML(r).

It recognized the Albanian Party of Labor as the leader of the world communist movement.

== See also ==
- List of anti-revisionist groups

== Publications ==
- Rauði fáninn 1972 (KSML) - 7.1979
- Stéttabaráttan 1972 (KHML/KSML) - 9.1980
- Programme of the Communist Party of Iceland Marxist-Leninist, Reykjavík: Central Committee of CPI M-L, July 1976
