= Marxist–Leninist Party of Austria =

- Chairman: Franz Strobl
- Founded: 1963/1967
- Succeeded by: VRAÖ
- Ideology: Communism; Marxism-Leninism; Maoism; Anti-revisionism
- Political position: Far-left

The Marxist–Leninist Party of Austria (German: Marxistisch-Leninistische Partei Österreichs, MLPÖ) was founded in 1967 by members and activists of Marxists-Leninists of Austria. The central organ Rote Fahne ('Red Flag') was founded in 1963 by Franz Strobl the later chairman of MLPÖ.

== See also ==
- List of anti-revisionist groups
