= Winfried Nachtwei =

German politician (born 1946)

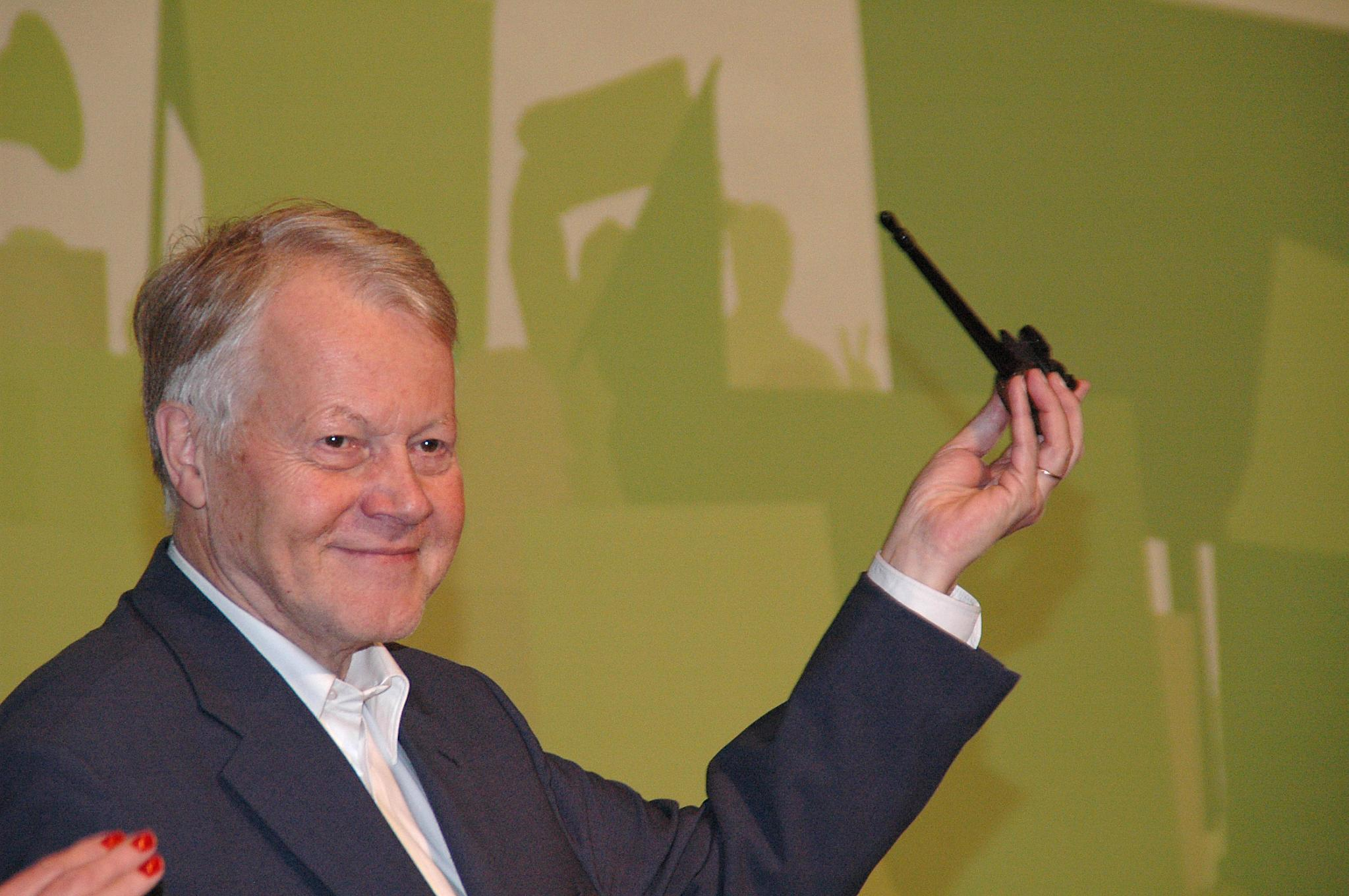
- Nachtwei in 2008

Member of the Bundestag
- In office 1994–2009

Personal details
- Born: 15 April 1946 (age 80) Wulfen, Dorsten
- Party: Alliance '90/The Greens
- Education: University of Münster

Winfried Nachtwei (born 15 April 1946) is a German politician and former member of Alliance '90/The Greens in the Bundestag. He is an expert on the Afghanistan conflict and works as a peace and conflict consultant since leaving the Bundestag. His nickname is "Winni".

== Political career ==
Nachtwei was a member of the Communist League of West Germany (Kommunistischer Bund Westdeutschland; KBW) in the 1970s.

Nachtwei first became a member of the German Bundestag in the 1994 elections, representing the electoral district of Münster. Throughout his time in parliament, he was a member of the Defence Committee.

In addition to his committee assignments, Nachtwei served as member of the Parliamentary Friendship Group for Relations with the SADC States; the Parliamentary Friendship Group for Relations with the Baltic States; and the German-Belarusian Parliamentary Friendship Group.

Nachtwei did not run for office again in the 2009 elections.

== Other activities ==
- CARE Deutschland-Luxemburg, Member of the Board of Trustees
- Center for International Peace Operations (ZIF), Member of the Supervisory Board (until 2009)
- Gegen Vergessen – Für Demokratie, Member of the Board
- Heinrich Böll Foundation, Member of the Europe/Transatlantic Advisory Board
- Internationales Bildungs- und Begegnungswerk, Member of the Board of Trustees
- Education and Science Workers' Union (GEW), Member

== Works ==
- Namibia : Von der antikolonialen Revolte zum nationalen Befreiungskampf; Geschichte der ehemaligen deutschen Kolonie Südwestafrikas, Mannheim: Sendler, 1976 (Book series Nationale Befreiung; 7) ISBN 3-88048-029-X
