= Heide Rühle =

German politician and former Member of the European Parliament (born 1948)

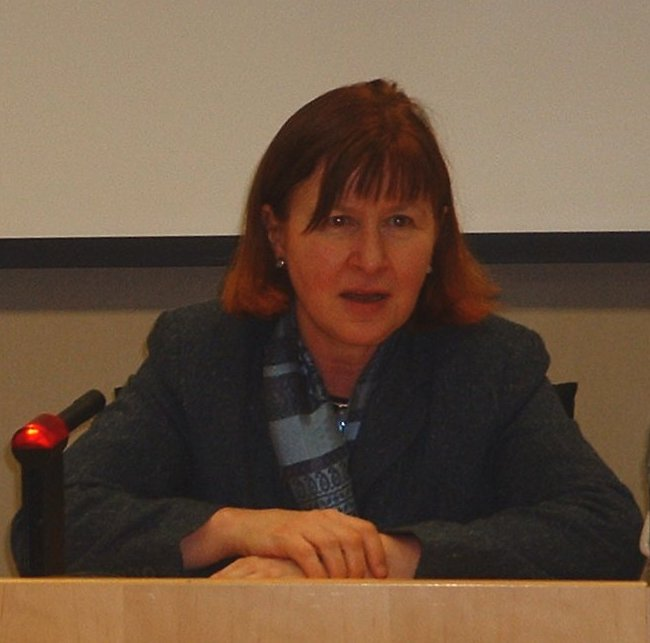
- Rühle in 2007

Member of European Parliament
- In office 1999–2014

Personal details
- Born: November 5, 1948 (age 77) Heilbronn, American Occupation Zone
- Party: Alliance '90/The Greens (1984–); Communist Workers’ League of Germany (1970s)
- Education: University of Tübingen
- Awards: Order of Merit of the Federal Republic of Germany; Order of Merit of Baden-Württemberg

Heide Rühle (German: [ˈhaɪdə ˈʁyːlə]; born 5 November 1948, in Heilbronn) is a German politician and former Member of the European Parliament for Alliance '90/The Greens, part of the European Greens.

She put forward proposals for harmonising member states' rules regarding inter-country transfers of military equipment in 2008.
