= Joscha Schmierer =

German politician and writer

Hans-Gerhard Schmierer
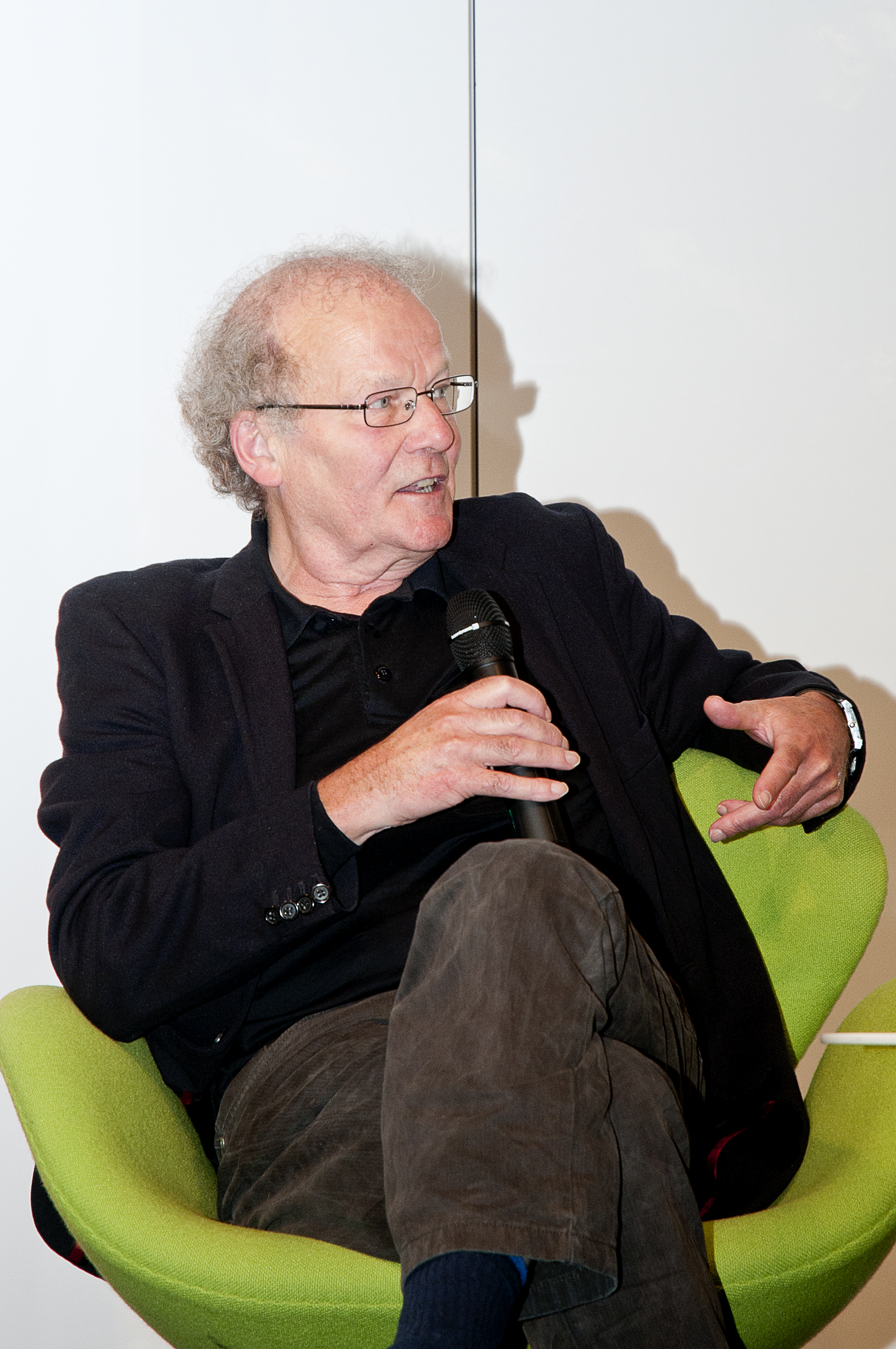
- Schmierer in 2011
- Born: 1 April 1942 (age 84); Stuttgart, Germany
- Other name: Joscha Schmierer
- Known for: Involvement in politics

Hans-Gerhart "Joscha" Schmierer (born 1 April 1942) is a German politician, author, and former radical activist. He has been a significant figure in left-wing politics and later transitioned into roles in international relations and policy advisory.

== Life ==
Joscha Schmierer was born in Stuttgart. He initially aimed for an academic career and planned to earn a Ph.D. under the mentorship of historian Werner Conze. However, in a 1969 public forum, Schmierer dramatically hurled eggs at Conze to protest his defense of the Wehrmacht's actions in Eastern Europe. This act not only made headlines but also terminated his academic pursuits.

In the late '60s, Schmierer was active in student politics, serving on the national board of the Socialist German Student Union (SDS) in 1968. He rose to prominence in 1973 as a co-founder of the Communist League of West Germany (KBW), a Maoist organization. Schmierer was a guiding force in the KBW until its disbandment in 1985. In a controversial move, he led a KBW delegation to Cambodia in December 1978 to express solidarity with dictator Pol Pot.

Schmierer found himself behind bars for two-thirds of an eight-month sentence in 1975, due to "serious breach of the peace" during a 1970 protest. During his incarceration, Martin Fochler assumed his role as secretary of the KBW's Central Committee.

Throughout the turbulent '70s, Schmierer and his KBW often clashed ideologically with more anarchist-leaning groups. One such group was the Revolutionary Struggle, which included notable figures like Joschka Fischer and Daniel Cohn-Bendit.

While Schmierer has evolved over the years, he's never completely disavowed his radical past. Instead, he's reinterpreted his early stances, positioning them within a broader framework advocating for democracy.

== Works ==
=== Books ===
- "Die Verfassung der BRD und das demokratische Programm der Kommunisten" (The Constitution of the Federal Republic of Germany and the Democratic Program of the Communists) - 1974
- "Sozialfaschismusthese und politische Programmatik der KPD 1928–33" (Thesis on Social Fascism and the Political Program of the KPD 1928–33) - 1975
- "Die neue Alte Welt oder wo Europas Mitte liegt: Essay" (The New Old World or Where the Center of Europe Lies: Essay) - 1993
- "Mein Name sei Europa. Einigung ohne Mythos und Utopie" (Let My Name Be Europe: Unification Without Myth or Utopia) - 1996
- "Keine Supermacht, nirgends: Den Westen neu erfinden" (No Superpower Anywhere: Reinventing the West) - 2009

=== Articles/Contributions ===
- "Der Zauber des großen Augenblicks. 1968 und der internationale Traum" (The Magic of the Grand Moment: 1968 and the International Dream)
- "Grüner Neuansatz und linke Sammlungsbewegung" (Green New Approach and Leftist Gathering Movement)
- "Staatenwelt als Medium der Staatsbildung. Prekäre Staatlichkeit in der postimperialen Konstellation" (World of States as Medium of State Formation: Precarious Statehood in the Post-Imperial Constellation)
