= Marxist–Leninist Party of Germany =

Marxist-Leninist Party of Germany Marxistisch-Leninistische Partei Deutschlands
- Leader: Gabi Fechtner
- Founded: 1982; 44 years ago
- Preceded by: Communist Workers Union of Germany
- Headquarters: Gelsenkirchen, North Rhine-Westphalia
- Newspaper: Rote Fahne Magazin
- Youth wing: REBELL
- Membership (2018): 2,800
- Ideology: Communism; Marxism–Leninism; Maoism; Stalinism
- Political position: Far-left
- European affiliation: ICOR Europe
- International affiliation: ICOR
- Colours: Red and yellow

Party flag

Website
- mlpd.de

The Marxist–Leninist Party of Germany (German: Marxistisch–Leninistische Partei Deutschlands, MLPD) is a Marxist-Leninist party political party in Germany. It was founded in 1982 by members of the Communist Workers Union of Germany (Kommunistischer Arbeiterbund Deutschlands; KABD) and is one of the minor parties in Germany.

The MLPD advocates for the establishment of a seizure of power through the proletariat, overthrowing current capitalist relations of production and replacing them with a new social order of socialist orientation. It sees this as a transitional stage to the creation of a classless, communist society. In doing so, it refers to the theory and practice of Karl Marx, Friedrich Engels and Vladimir Lenin. It rejects the terms "Stalinism" and "Maoism" as anti-communist fighting terms that divide the Marxist–Leninist movement. Whilst criticizing particular aspects of the political works of Stalin and Mao, MLPD openly defends those works, standing in contrast to most left-wing groups in Germany.

Until 2017 it participated in the International Conference of Marxist–Leninist Parties and Organizations (ICMLPO). In 2010 MLPD joined the International Coordination of Revolutionary Parties and Organizations (ICOR). Representatives from the party have attended congresses of other communist parties around the world.

== Political profile ==
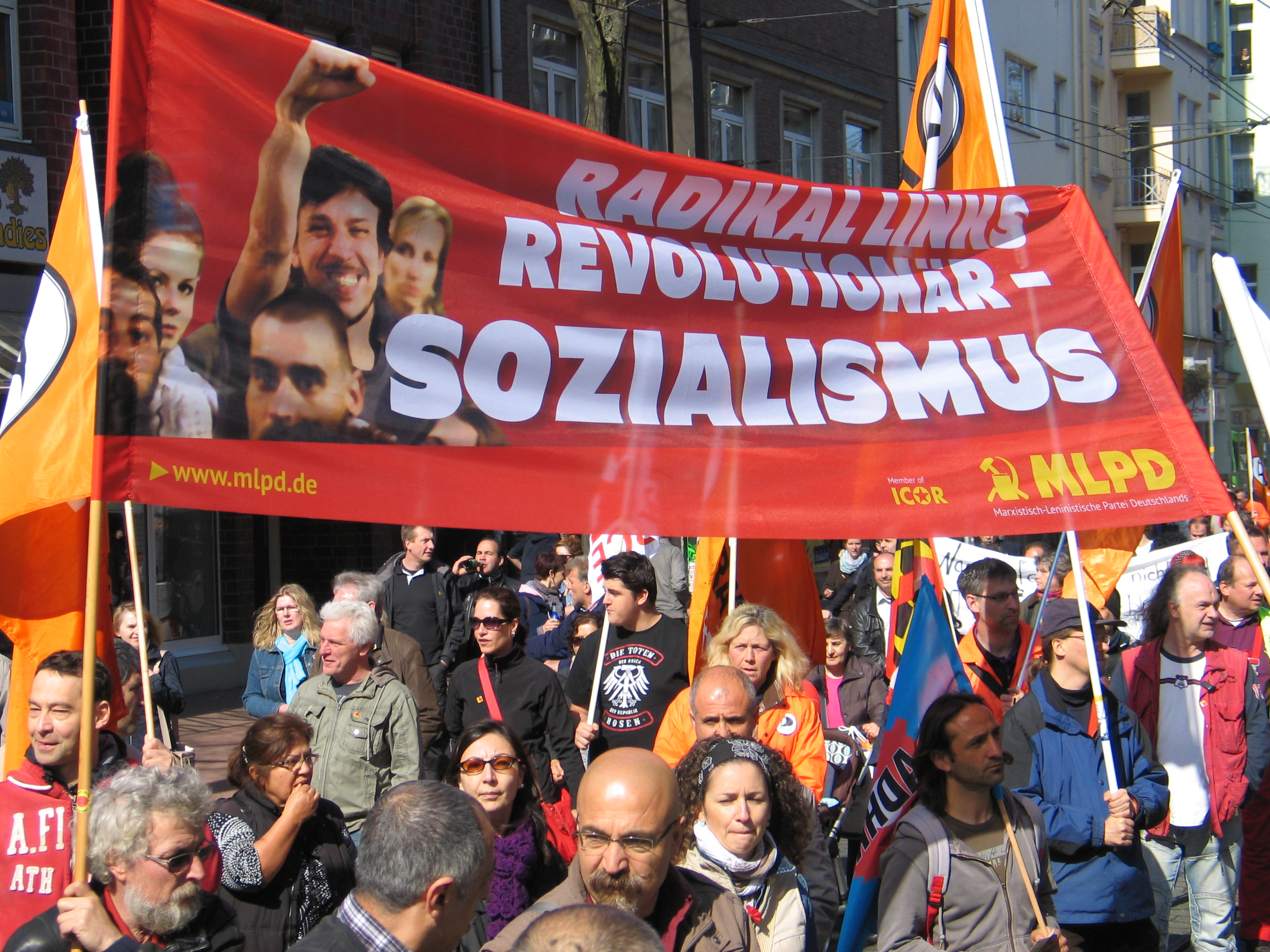
MLPD banner at a 2013 demonstration

The MLPD calls its political orientation "Echter Sozialismus" ("Genuine Socialism”). The party says that the augmentation "Echt" ("Real") has the tactical purpose "to distinguish itself from the various distortions of modern revisionism and reformism", like Trotskyism, which the MLPD calls a "petty-bourgeois divergence from Marxism". In this way the party distinguishes itself from other left parties, like the German Communist Party, The Left or the Socialist Equality Party.

Additionally, MLPD describes the current governments People's Republic of China and North Korea as "bureaucratic-capitalist" countries.

== History ==
The MLPD promotes Marxism–Leninism and Mao Zedong Thought. The party openly promotes critical literary works of Willi Dickhut, Vladimir Lenin, Friedrich Engels, Joseph Stalin, Mao Zedong and Karl Marx on their websites as well as in their meetings. Only part of the MLPD's membership originates from the 1960s students' movement. Willi Dickhut, the party's founder, had been expelled from the Communist Party of Germany in 1966 for criticizing the change of social conditions in the Soviet Union. His book on the restoration of capitalism in the Soviet Union was published in 1971 and is a fundamental part of the MLPD's ideology. The MLPD describes the political and economic changes in most of the Eastern European countries after the 20th Party Congress of the Communist Party of the Soviet Union as treason to socialism. From 1976, when the economic changes provided by Deng Xiaoping were taking place, the MLPD's predecessor organizations criticized those changes as China's restoration of capitalism.

In the 1998 federal elections, the party gained only 0.01 percent of the votes. In 2002, the MLPD did not participate in the federal elections and called on people to boycott. The MLPD participated in the 2005 federal elections, generally positioning itself in campaigns as a radical alternative to the Left Party. The MLPD won 0.1 percent of the total votes cast. This marked a tenfold increase compared to the result of 1998, despite the competition with the Left Party. Its strongest showing was in the states of Saxony-Anhalt and Thuringia, where it garnered 0.4 percent of the vote. MLPD also participated in 2009 federal elections and has announced its participation in the 2013 federal elections.

Still, some trade unions in Germany have a policy of expelling members of the MLPD. An example of this is when the former chairman of the party, Stefan Engel, was forced to leave the IG Metall and became a member of Ver.di, which does not take a stance against the MLPD.

For the 2017 federal election, the MLPD formed the Internationalistischen Bündnis (Internationalist Alliance) coalition. The coalition is made up of different local electoral groups, migrant organizations (such as ATIF, ADHK and the German section of the Communist Party of Iran) and labor union groups.

Although the party has seen little success in national or state elections, the party has managed to gain a number of local councils seats. However these party are contested under a different local label and not with an explicit communist program. However these parties are all members of the MLPD-led electoral coalition Internationalist Alliance.

== Election results ==
=== Federal Parliament (Bundestag) ===
| Year | First Vote | Second Vote | % of Second Vote |
|---|---|---|---|
| 1987 | 596 | 13,422 | 0.04% |
| 1994 | 4,932 | 10,038 | 0.02% |
| 1998 | 7,208 | 4,731 | 0.01% |
| 2005 | 16,480 | 45,238 | 0.10% |
| 2009 | 17,512 | 29,261 | 0.10% |
| 2013 | 12,904 | 24,219 | 0.10% |
| 2017 | 35,835 | 29,928 | 0.10% |
| 2021 | 22,754 | 17,994 | 0.04% |
| 2025 | 24,208 | 19,876 | 0.04% |

=== European Parliament ===
| Election | Votes | % | Seats | +/– | EP Group |
|---|---|---|---|---|---|
| 1989 | 10,134 | 0.04 (#21) | 0 / 81 | New | – |
| 1994 | Did not contest | | 0 / 81 | 0 | – |
| 1999 | Did not contest | | 0 / 81 | 0 | – |
| 2004 | Did not contest | | 0 / 81 | 0 | – |
| 2009 | Did not contest | | 0 / 81 | 0 | – |
| 2014 | 18,198 | 0.06 (#23) | 0 / 81 | 0 | – |
| 2019 | 18,340 | 0.05 (#38) | 0 / 81 | 0 | – |
| 2024 | 13,553 | 0.03 (#34) | 0 / 81 | 0 | – |

=== Local Elections of Alliances with MLPD Participation ===
| City | Election Year | Seats | % | Label |
|---|---|---|---|---|
| Albstadt | 2024 | 1 / 32 | 3.3% | zukunftsorientiert unabhängig gemeinsam (ZUG) |
| Bergkamen | 2025 | 2 / 44 | 5.9% | Bergauf Bergkamen |
| Eisenach | 2024 | 0 / 36 | 1.8% | Eisenacher Aufbruch |
| Esslingen am Neckar | 2019 | 1 / 40 | 2.7% | Fortschrittlich – Überparteilich – Rege (FÜR) |
| Gelsenkirchen | 2025 | 1 / 66 | 0.9% | Alternativ – Unabhängig – Fortschrittlich (AUF) |
| Neukirchen-Vluyn | 2025 | 3 / 38 | 7.9% | Neukirchen-Vluyn AUF geht's |
