= Ralf Fücks =

German politician (born 1951)

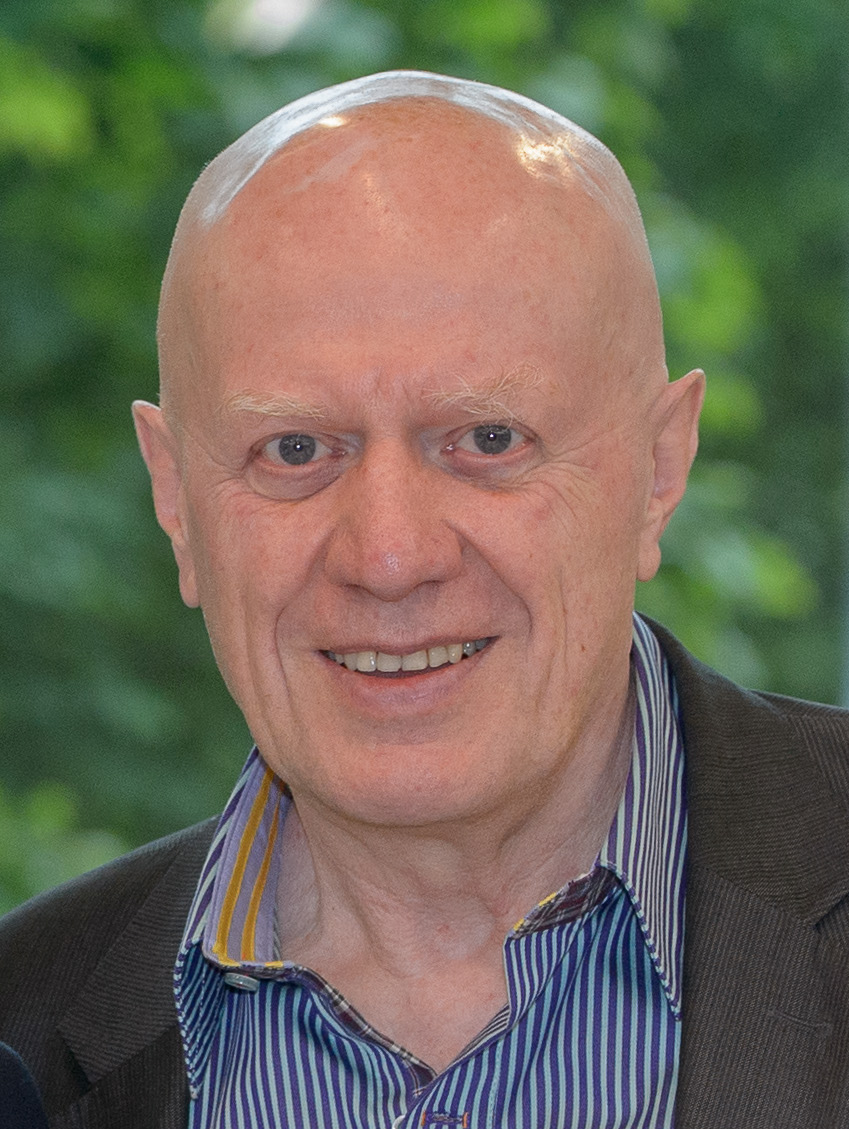
Fücks in 2015

Ralf Fücks (German: [fʏks]; born 3 August 1951) is a German politician. He was born in Edenkoben and has been a member of the Green Party of Germany since 1982 and has been Mayor of Bremen. He is a member of the Green European Foundation and Heinrich Böll Foundation. Since 2006 he is married to green politician Marieluise Beck, they have two daughters.
