= Bahamas (magazine) =

German political magazine

- Logo
- Frequency: about 3 times a year
- First issue: 1992
- Country: Germany
- Based in: Berlin
- Website: www.redaktion-bahamas.org
- ISSN: 1614-7057

Bahamas is a post-leftwing German political magazine with a leading role in the anti-German movement. Bahamas is published in Berlin with three issues per annum.

== Background ==
Bahamas was founded in 1992 in Hamburg by the minority fraction of the dissolved Communist League (KB), named "group K". It emerged from the 1990s dispute within the KB about the position on the emerging reunification of Germany. While KB's majority current merged with the Eastern German Communist Party renamed Party of Democratic Socialism (PDS), focusing on social opposition to the consequences of the expected restoration of capitalism, the KB minority expected a renewed German nationalism, the resurgence of racism, anti-Semitism and historical revisionism, which would lead to new German power ambitions and therefore focused on radically opposing reunification of the German state.

Their pessimistic outlook led them to suggest they would "emigrate to the Bahamas", in an argument to Knut Mellenthin, a prominent spokesman for the majority faction. "Bahamas" quickly became the name of their main publication organ.

== History ==
In the first years of publication, Bahamas presented a pluralistic debate organ for forces of the radical left from different backgrounds, with a common focus on opposition to nationalism, racism and anti-Semitism, and the trivialization of those topics among the traditional far left. Gradually the authors started a tendency towards the positions of Freiburg Initiative Socialist forum - relying on critical theory, especially that of Theodor W. Adorno. Over time, this led to a further distancing from traditional positions of the Left, and the magazine's focus today is on anti-Semitism. Most of the former KB members left the magazine.

The core values of the magazine are that criticism of capitalism is only "emancipatory" if it is based on a theoretical insight into the "fetishism" of the capitalist relations of production and if the progressive achievements of liberal bourgeois society, namely the emancipation of the individual from primitive life forms and collectives, is affirmed and carried further. Fetishised critique of capitalism, which attacks the sphere of circulation (questions of distributive justice, moral protest against exploitative behavior, the pursuit of values of solidarity within communities), on the other hand, is criticized as "racist" and "anti-Semitic." Germany is considered the epitome of the "nationalist" principle (citizenship on the basis of descent). As a positive counter-model in Bahamas' republican France was chosen because it is based on civil rights rather founded on a community of descent nation. Above all, unconditional solidarity with Israel was defined as the highest principle.

The intensification of the conflict in the Middle East led to the Bahamas' editorial board increasingly representing Islamists as "jihadist" enemies of modern civilization, comparing Islamic thought structures and organizations with those of fascism and Nazism, eventually resulting in open endorsement of the United States and the war on terror.
