= Communist League of West Germany =

Maoist communist organization in West Germany, 1973–1985

Logo of the Communist League of West Germany

Front cover of the Kommunistische Volkszeitung, newspaper of the Communist League of West Germany from 1974

The Communist League of West Germany (Kommunistischer Bund Westdeutschland; KBW) was a Maoist organization in West Germany which existed from 1973 until 1985. The KBW contested the general elections in 1976 and 1980 in West Germany and was rated as the strongest of the German Maoist parties from 1974 until 1981. After 1982 the KBW was virtually inactive and was finally dissolved completely in 1985.

A number of the former KBW members became more conservative politicians ("Realos") in The Greens: Reinhard Bütikofer, Winfried Kretschmann, Ursula Lötzer, Krista Sager, Ralf Fücks und Ulla Schmidt.

== History ==
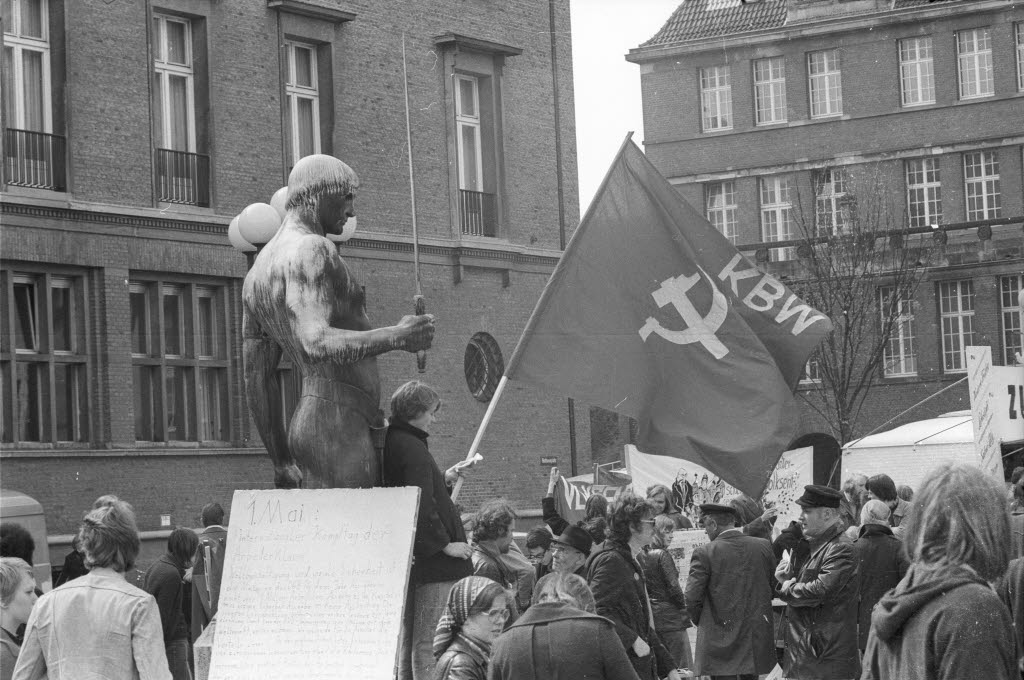
KBW flag at a 1976 demonstration

The KBW was formed at a conference held in Bremen in June 1973 as a fusion of various local communist groups from Heidelberg, Bremen, Göttingen, Freiburg etc. At its inaugural conference the KBW adopted a programme advocating the revolutionary overthrow of capitalism and the bourgeois state and the establishment of the dictatorship of the proletariat in order to achieve a classless society and communism. In its programme the KBW demanded the arming of the people (”Allgemeine Volksbewaffnung“).

One of the main efforts of the KBW was the struggle against the Bundeswehr (Federal Armed Forces). It organized youth camps dedicated to ideological and practical training for the revolutionary struggle. Members of the KBW participated in violent demonstrations against nuclear power plants in West Germany (Brokdorf, Grohnde).

On September 21, 1975, the KBW and his Committees against § 218 organized a demonstration of 25,000 people in Bonn against the West German law prohibiting abortion.

The KBW contested the general elections in 1976 and 1980 and several state (German Bundesland) and local elections. The organization obtained 20,018 votes or 0,1% in the 1976 elections (8,285 votes 1980). It won one seat in the Heidelberg city council in 1975 which was lost later. Strongholds of the KBW were university towns.

The KBW headquarters moved from Mannheim to Frankfurt am Main in April 1977. When the Minister-President of Lower Saxony, Ernst Albrecht, proposed a ban on three maoist groups in 1977, KBW, the maoist Kommunistische Partei Deutschlands (KPD/AO) and the Communist Party of Germany/Marxist-Leninist (KPD/ML) demonstrated together in Bonn with about 16,000 supporters.

The Zimbabwe African National Union (ZANU) was supported in its armed struggle by contributions from the KBW. ZANU politicians Ndabaningi Sithole, Robert Mugabe and Edgar Tekere visited West Germany several times at invitation of the KBW.

The organization split in the summer of 1980 when about a quarter of the membership formed the League of West German Communists (Bund Westdeutscher Kommunisten; BWK), which continued to work on the basis of the KBW programme of 1973.

In 1982, the KBW abandoned its objective of establishing the dictatorship of the proletariat and started to infiltrate The Greens (Die Grünen). The official weekly KVZ and the theoretical organ KuK ceased publication at the end of 1982. Their successor, the monthly Kommune, was no longer a KBW magazine.

== Structure ==
The organizational principle of the KBW was democratic centralism. Since 1977 the organization was divided into three regional (Nord, Mitte, Süd) and 40 district units. It had in the beginning a 13-member (later expanded) Central Committee and a five-member Standing Committee (Ständiger Ausschuss).

The KBW had 900 members in 1973 and about 5,000 (with affiliated organizations) in 1977. Membership declined later due to the high demands the party made on their members, lack of success and the dramatic changes in the politics of the People's Republic of China.

Secretary of the Central Committee's Standing Committee from 1973 until 1982 was Joscha Schmierer.

== Activity ==
For a KBW activist, a normal week looked as follows: Monday from 5.30am-7.30am the selling of the weekly Communist Peoples Newspaper (KVZ) in front of a factory gate or at the railway station, followed by a branch meeting on Monday evening. Tuesday started early again with KVZ sales, as did Wednesday. On Wednesday evening there was usually a training course based on an article from the theoretical organ "Communism and Class Struggle". On Saturday there was various public activity (mostly information stands with newspaper sales), and the whole of Sunday was devoted to the study of Marxist-Leninist classics. On free afternoons leaflets were distributed and more extensive training courses took place.

== Electoral work ==
The KBW also took part in elections. In general elections, the KBW only got around 0.1 percent of the votes. More important was the actual number of people voting for the KBW (20,018). This gave a relative good indication of how many people of the time actually approved of the violent overthrow of the capitalist system. Other smaller revolutionary parties also got about 25,000 votes at this time (1976).

The KBW had its biggest success in the communal elections of Baden-Württemberg on April 20, 1975, when they received 83,418 out of 2,316,648 (3.6%) votes in the university city of Heidelberg (German municipal elections use panachage or cumulative voting). It went largely unnoticed by the local newspaper Rhein-Neckar-Zeitung (RNZ), only a statement by one candidate - "KBW for armed subversion" (KBW für bewaffneten Umsturz) caused a major stir. Helga Rosenbaum, a 32-year old chemical laboratory technician, received about 6,000 votes, as KBW voters made ample use of the opportunity to cast and accumulate votes, and thus was elected to the Heidelberg city council. Already at the council's first meeting, RNZ reported "tumult at the pledge in the town hall", when she refused to take an oath to uphold the German constitution's Liberal democratic basic order. In her capacity as a city councillor, she called for demonstrations against fare increases on the municipal transport company Heidelberger Straßen- und Bergbahn, as well as for the violent overthrow of the Federal Republic. She had to be expelled from the council meetings several times for disruption, and had criminal charges filed against her for various offenses, such as calling Heidelberg's Lord Mayor Reinhold Zundel (SPD) a "friend of American war criminals" ("Freund der amerikanischen Kriegsverbrecher") and a "symbol of perfidy and exploitation" ("Symbol der Niedertracht und Ausbeutung").

Rosenbaum attempted to run in the May 9, 1976, mayoral election, but was disqualified by the municipal election committee on April 26, 1976, because she made no secret of the fact that she did not support the liberal-democratic basic order, which however, is a requirement under Section 46 of Baden-Württemberg municipal code. On September 16, 1976, she was expelled from this body by a unanimous vote of other parties. Her seat remained vacant, and was then gradually taken by other KBW candidates, who caused similar disruptions. She then left Heidelberg for party's northern regional leadership in Hanover. While there, she was arrested for trespassing and insulting the state, and sentenced to two years and ten months imprisonment at the women's penitentiary in Vechta at the beginning of 1980. While incarcerated, she was included on KBW's Lower Saxony state list at 1980 federal elections, but was not granted leave, as the prison enforcement chamber feared she would misuse her release from prison or leave to commit crimes.

== Finances ==
Contrary to most political parties, KBW had no major financial problems, with KVZ and other publications giving the party a healthy income. Another important factor was financial contributions from party members. There were no set party dues as such, rather, in each cell it was specified, what the individual member had to pay. Members in employment generally contributed one-third of their income. Added to that were the various donations that came in. Individual members brought in entire fortunes and inheritances. In the mid-1970s annual contributions and donations amounted to around 5 million DM and the income from the sales of the various publications was a further 2 million DM.

== Orientation ==
The KBW subscribed to the ideas of Karl Marx, Friedrich Engels, Vladimir Lenin, Joseph Stalin and Mao Zedong, whose writings were distributed through KBW bookshops (or later party offices). It sided with the politics of the Chinese Communist Party until 1980. Condolences and greetings of KBW secretary Hans-Gerhart "Joscha" Schmierer were published frequently since 1976 in the Peking Review (later Beijing Review). It sent delegations to China several times and to the Democratic Kampuchea of Pol Pot in late 1978.

== Party slogan ==
Vorwärts im Kampf für die Rechte der Arbeiterklasse und des Volkes - Vorwärts im Kampf für den Sieg des Sozialismus (Forward in the struggle for the rights of the working class and the people - Forward in the struggle for the victory of socialism)

== Affiliated organizations ==
- Gesellschaft zur Unterstützung der Volkskämpfe, (GUV), (Society for Support of People's Struggles) for intellectuals
- Komitees und Initiativen gegen den § 218 (Committees against the [German abortion law] § 218)
- Kommunistische Hochschulgruppe (KHG), Kommunistischer Studentenbund (KSB) for university students
- Kommunistischer Jugendbund (KJB), the 1976 merger of Kommunistische Schülergruppe (KSG), Kommunistischer Oberschülerbund (KOB) and Kommunistischer Arbeiterjugendbund (KAJB), for young people
- Soldaten- und Reservisten Komitees (SRK), (Soldiers' and Reservists' Committees) for the antimilitaristic struggle
- Vereinigung für revolutionäre Volksbildung - Soldaten und Reservisten (Association of revolutionary People's education - Soldiers and Reservists) was the 1979 merger of GUV, § 218 Komitees and SRK following the substantial membership losses in the auxiliary organizations of the KBW

== Publications ==
- Kommunistische Volkszeitung [Communist Peoples Newspaper], KVZ, 1973, July — 1982, biweekly, later weekly official organ of KBW central committee
- Kommunismus und Klassenkampf [Communism and Class Struggle], KuK, 1972 — 1982, monthly theoretical organ
- Kommune, 1983, January ff., monthly (individual editors)
- Programme of the Kommunistischer Bund Westdeutschland, Mannheim 1975 (English translation of Programm und Statut des Kommunistischen Bundes Westdeutschland, 1973)

== Former members of the KBW ==
- Jörg Baberowski
- Reinhard Bütikofer
- Ralf Fücks
- Winfried Kretschmann
- Winfried Nachtwei
- Frieder Nake
- Sven Regener
- Heidi Schelhowe
- Ulla Schmidt
- Joscha Schmierer

== Literature ==
- Verfassungsschutzbericht, issues 1973 until 1985
- Yearbook on International Communist Affairs, ed. by Hoover Institution, 1973 ff.
- Political parties of the world; Compiled and edited by Alan J. Day and Henry W. Degenhardt, Harlow: Longman, 1980 (p. 126)
- Ulrich Probst: The communist parties in the Federal Republic of Germany, Frankfurt/Main: Haag + Herchen, 1981 (German: Die kommunistischen Parteien in der Bundesrepublik Deutschland)) ISBN 3-88129-451-1
- Communist and Marxist parties of the world; comp. and written by Charles Hobday, Harlow: Longman, 1986 (pp. 71–72)
- Robert J. Alexander: Maoism in the developed world; Westport, Conn.: Praeger, 2001 (pp. 84–86)
