= Anti-Germans (political current) =

Theoretical and political trend in the left and liberals mainly in Germany and Austria

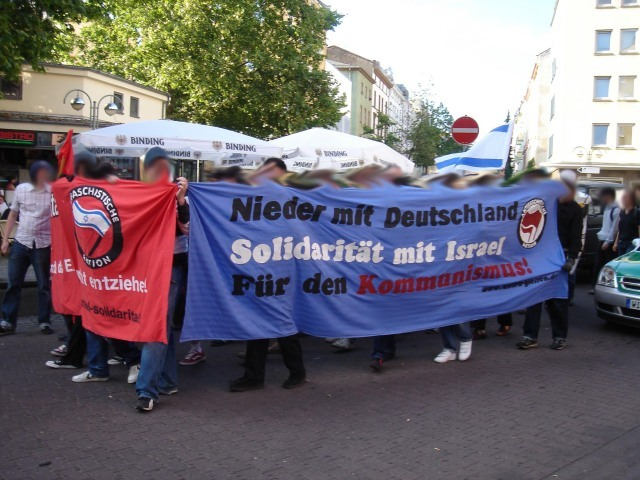
Anti-German communist protesters in Frankfurt in 2006. The banner reads "Down with Germany/Solidarity with Israel/For Communism!".

"Anti-German" (German: Antideutsch; also Antideutsch(e) movement) is a collective term applied to a variety of theoretical and political tendencies within the left mainly in Germany and Austria. The anti-Germans form one of the main camps within the broader Antifa movement, alongside the anti-Zionist anti-imperialists, after the two currents split between the 1990s and the early 2000s as a result of their diverging views on Israel.

The anti-Germans are a fringe movement within the German left. In 2006 Deutsche Welle estimated the number of anti-Germans to be between 500 and 3,000.

The basic standpoint of the anti-Germans includes opposition to German nationalism, a critique of mainstream left anti-capitalist views, which are thought to be simplistic and structurally antisemitic, and a critique of antisemitism, which is considered to be deeply rooted in German cultural history. As a result of this analysis of antisemitism, support for Israel and opposition to anti-Zionism is a primary unifying factor of the anti-German movement. The critical theory of Theodor Adorno and Max Horkheimer is often cited by anti-German theorists.

== Emergence ==
The rapid collapse of the German Democratic Republic and the looming reunification of Germany triggered a major crisis within the German Left. The anti-German tendency first developed in a discussion group known as the Radical Left, which consisted of elements of the German Green Party, Trotskyists, members of the Communist League (Kommunistischer Bund), the journal konkret, and members of Autonome, Libertarian and Anarchist groups, who rejected plans by other segments of Leftist political organisations to join a governing coalition. This circle adopted a position developed by the Kommunistischer Bund, a decidedly pessimistic analysis with regard to the potential for revolutionary change in Germany. Known as the "fascization" analysis, this theory held that due to the particularity of German history and development, the endemic crisis of capitalism would lead to a move towards the far right and to a new Fascism.

During an internal debate, representatives of the majority tendency said that the minority current, due to its bleak analysis and unwavering pessimism, might as well just emigrate to the Bahamas. The minority tendency, in an ironic gesture, thus named their discussion organ Bahamas. In 2007 Haaretz described Bahamas as "the leading publication of the hardcore pro-Israel, anti-German communist movement." The phrase Nie wieder Deutschland ("Germany, Never Again"), which became a central anti-German slogan, originated in demonstrations against reunification, the largest of which attracted a crowd of approximately 10,000 people. This early alliance dissipated shortly after the process of reunification was complete.

== Development in the 1990s ==
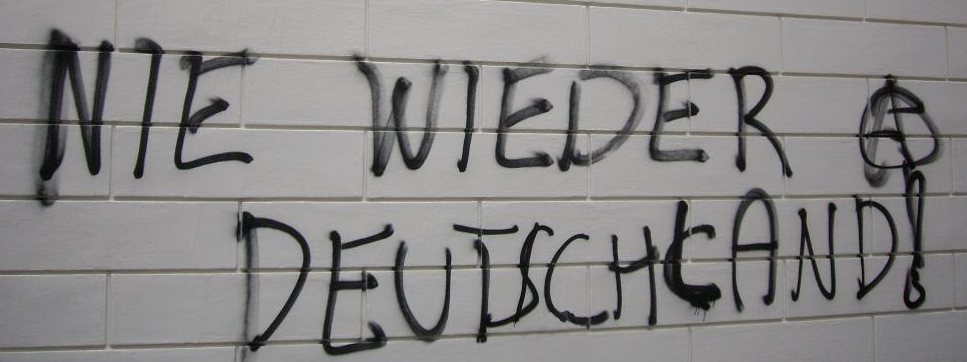
Never again Germany graffiti in Vienna, 2009

The notion of a revival of German nationalism and racism as a result of the reunification seemed to confirm itself over the course of the 1990s, as shown by such events as the Rostock-Lichtenhagen riots and a murderous attack on a Turkish family in the West German town of Solingen. This wave of anti-immigrant violence led to tightening of Germany's hitherto liberal asylum laws.

As a result of these conflicts, through the 1990s, small groups and circles associated with anti-German ideas began to emerge throughout Germany, refining their ideological positions by dissenting from prevailing opinions within the German Left. These positions became particularly prominent within "Anti-fascist" groups. The Gulf War in 1990 consolidated the Anti-German position around a new issue, specifically criticism of the broader Left's failure to side with Israel against rocket attacks launched into civilian areas by the regime of Saddam Hussein. Left-wing writers such as Eike Geisel and Wolfgang Pohrt criticised the German peace movement for failing to appreciate the threat posed by Ba'athism to left-wing movements through the Middle East, in particular around the Iraqi regime's use of poison gas.

The outbreak of the Second Intifada provided another focal point for the emerging Anti-German movement. According to Assaf Moghadam, the Anti-German movement's unconditional support for Israel, in contrast to the position of most left-wing organizations, was further intensified by the September 11 attacks on America, with anti-Germans strongly criticising other leftist positions that claimed that Al-Qaeda's assault on the United States was motivated by anti-imperialist or anti-capitalist resistance against American hegemony, instead claiming that Al-Qaeda and their attacks represented what Patrick Hagen characterised as a modern form of fascism that needed to be stringently opposed. Osama bin Laden, al Qaeda's leader, had written in the preceding years about various grievences against the United States and their allies, including Western military presence in Saudi Arabia (his home country and the location of Mecca and Medina) and mass killings of Muslims in numerous other countries.

In 1995, the fiftieth anniversary of the bombing of Dresden, anti-Germans praised the bombing on the grounds that so many of the city's civilians had supported Nazism. Kyle James points to this as an example of a shift towards support for the United States that became more pronounced after 9/11. Similar demonstrations are annually held, the slogans "Bomber Harris, do it again!" and "Deutsche Täter sind keine Opfer!" ("German perpetrators are no victims!") have become common.

The reasons the German government gave to legitimize the war – from an anti-German perspective – marked a turning point in the discourse of governmental history-policy. The war was not justified "despite but because of Auschwitz". This judgment is often combined with the analysis of the genesis of a new national self as the "Aufarbeitungsweltmeister" or "Weltmeister der Vergangenheitsbewältigung" (world champion in dealing with and mastering one's own past evil deeds).

Later anti-German focal points included the Stop The Bomb Coalition, active in both Germany and Austria, to maintain sanctions against Iranian attempts to obtain nuclear weapons.

The anti-Germans (and the Deutsch-Israelische Gesellschaft) have produced many of the anti-antisemitism commissioners hired by German institutions after the 2015 European migrant crisis.

== Positions and self-understanding ==
The anti-German current is a heterogeneous but, in key aspects, consistent political tendency within the radical left that emerged in the wake of German reunification and in response to global conflicts such as the Gulf War. At its ideological core lies a fundamental rejection of German nationalism, a radical critique of antisemitism, anti-Zionism, and anti-Americanism, and an unwavering solidarity with Israel as a refuge for Jewish life after the Holocaust.

Adherents often view themselves as a continuation of the leftist tradition, particularly in addressing what they see as the failure of classical leftist movements to adequately confront and combat antisemitism. They criticize large parts of the radical left for supporting or excusing authoritarian or reactionary regimes under the banner of anti-imperialism.

Typical features of Antideutsche critique include:

- radical solidarity with Israel, including a consistent defense of its right to self-defense and existence as a Jewish state, even when this leads to controversial positions on Israeli military actions;
- criticism of structural antisemitism within leftist, anti-imperialist, and Islamist discourses;
- rejection of German patriotism and national identity as potentially fascistic;
- opposition to anti-Western and anti-American rhetoric, which is viewed as a gateway for coded antisemitism;
- suspicion of regressive forms of anti-capitalism, especially when invoking antisemitic tropes such as the "parasitic financier" or "rootless capital."

The Antideutsche milieu is primarily characterized by its publishing activities rather than formal political organizations. Its discourse is strongly theory-driven, often influenced by Critical Theory (e.g., Theodor W. Adorno, Max Horkheimer), but also shaped by a polemical and essayistic style.

== Criticisms ==
Zionist leftists that are linked to the Antideutsche movement in Germany and Austria have been accused of targeting left-wing German Jews and Austrian Jews.

According to Haaretz writer Ofri Ilany, "Incensed Germans, some of them descendants of Nazis, don't hesitate to attack Jewish and Israeli left-wingers" and "besmirch Jews" and violate their freedom of expression "under the banner of the struggle against anti-Semitism." Left-wing Austrian-Jewish activist Isabel Frey said that "Jews are fetishized in this pseudo-tolerant way and assumed to have unified interests" by the political mainstream in Austria and Germany. According to Frey, "Jewish leftists are being accused of antisemitism by non-Jewish leftists. To me, these accusations are a way of denigrating our Jewish identities, of saying that we’re the “wrong kind” of Jew. I keep asking myself, are these accusations themselves a kind of antisemitism?" Michael Sappir, an Israeli-born German-Jewish anti-Zionist activist affiliated with Jewish-Israeli descent in Leipzig, has said in +972 Magazine that the experience of being an anti-Zionist Jewish leftist in Germany can be disempowering and "very isolating" because the German left is often associated with the Antideutsch movement. According to Sappir, Jewish leftists and other pro-Palestinian voices are marginalized in part because "Antideutsch groups have managed to bully them into silence" and that Jewish leftists "felt very insulted by the idea of calling this struggle 'antisemitic'".

The Anti-Deutsch movement has faced criticism for its perceived unconditional support of the State of Israel. Critics argue that this position often leads to the marginalization of Palestinian perspectives and struggles. Some sources note that Anti-Deutsch groups have defended Israeli government actions including the Gaza genocide. These positions have sparked debate within the German and international left, with opponents asserting that the movement's stance may conflict with broader anti-imperialist and human rights principles.

Critics have argued that sections of the Antideutsche movement have increasingly abandoned their original opposition to nationalism and imperialism in favour of an uncritical identification with the Israeli state. In a 2024 article published in the academic journal Historical Materialism, political researcher Leandros Fischer argued that parts of the movement had developed what he described as a form of "substitute nationalism" centred on Israel. He criticised the celebration of Israeli military violence as anti-fascism and the tendency to portray muslims as inherently antisemitic. Fischer further argued that the movement had contributed to shifting political discourse within the German left towards more pro-Israel positions, while making solidarity with Palestinian liberation increasingly controversial within left-wing circles.

== See also ==
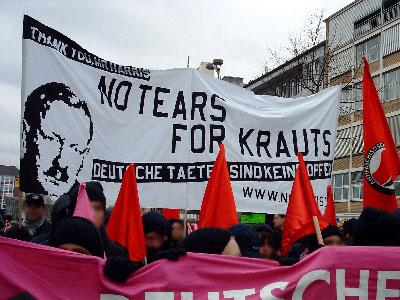
Anti-German banner expressing support for Air Chief Marshal Arthur Harris, who is associated with the area bombing of German cities

- New Antisemitism
- Henryk Broder
- Egotronic
- Matthias Küntzel
- Andrei Markovits
- Moishe Postone
- Anti-Japaneseism
- White guilt
- I Apologize campaign
- German collective guilt
- Anti-Palestinianism
- Haavara Agreement
- Euston Manifesto
- Anti-antisemitism in Germany
- Antifa (Israel)
- Neoconservatism

== Primary sources ==
- Harald Bergdorf and Rudolf van Hüllen. Linksextrem – Deutschlands unterschätzte Gefahr? Zwischen Brandanschlag und Bundestagsmandat. Schöningh, Paderborn and others (2011), ISBN 978-3-506-77242-8.
