= Kommunistische Partei Deutschlands (Aufbauorganisation) =

West German Maoist group (1970–1980)

The Kommunistische Partei Deutschlands (Aufbauorganisation) (KPD (AO), Communist Party of Germany (Pre-Party Formation)) was a West German Maoist group founded in 1970. It changed its name to the Kommunistische Partei Deutschlands (KPD) a year later.

In 1973 KPD members occupied and vandalized Bonn's city hall to protest a visit by South Vietnam's Prime Minister. By 1974 it was West Germany's most significant Maoist party, with 5,000 members. About a quarter of its members were women. It dissolved in 1980.

Jörg Immendorff illustrated some of their publications.

== Members ==
- Dieter Kunzelmann
- Horst Mahler
