= Impact of the COVID-19 pandemic on education =

Learners affected by school closures caused by COVID-19 as of February 2021 Full school closures Partial school closures Academic break Online learning No school closures No data

The COVID-19 pandemic affected educational systems across the world. The number of cases of COVID-19 started to rise in March 2020 and many educational institutions and universities underwent closure. Most countries decided to temporarily close the educational institutions in order to reduce the spread of COVID-19. UNESCO estimates that at the height of the closures in April 2020, national educational shutdowns affected nearly 1.6 billion students in 200 countries: 94% of the student population and one-fifth of the global population.

Closures are estimated to have lasted for an average of 41 weeks (10.3 months). They have had significant negative effects on student learning, which are predicted to have substantial long-term implications for both education and earnings, with disproportionate effects. The lockdowns more highly affected already disadvantaged students, and students in low and middle income nations.

During the pandemic, education budgets and official aid program budgets for education had decreased. Scarcer education options impacted people with few financial resources, while those with more found education. New online programs shifted the labor of education from schools to families and individuals, and consequently, people everywhere who relied on schools rather than computers and homeschooling had more difficulty. Early childhood education and care as well as school closures impacted students, teachers, and families, and far-reaching economic and societal consequences are expected.

School closures shed light on various social and economic issues, including student debt, digital learning, food security, and homelessness, as well as access to childcare, health care, housing, internet, and disability services. The impact was more severe for disadvantaged children and their families, causing interrupted learning, compromised nutrition, childcare problems, and consequent economic cost to families who could not work.

In response to school closures, UNESCO recommended the use of distance learning programmes and open educational applications and platforms that schools and teachers can use to reach learners remotely and limit the disruption of education. In 2020, UNESCO estimated that nearly 24 million will dropout, with South Asia and Western Asia being the most affected.

As of early 2025, academic recovery from pandemic-related disruptions remained slow and uneven across many regions. While some data indicated modest gains in mathematics proficiency since 2022, progress in reading often lagged significantly or showed continued decline in certain areas. Experts noted that, at current rates, full academic recovery could take several more years, with average student achievement still behind pre-pandemic levels.

== Past school closures ==
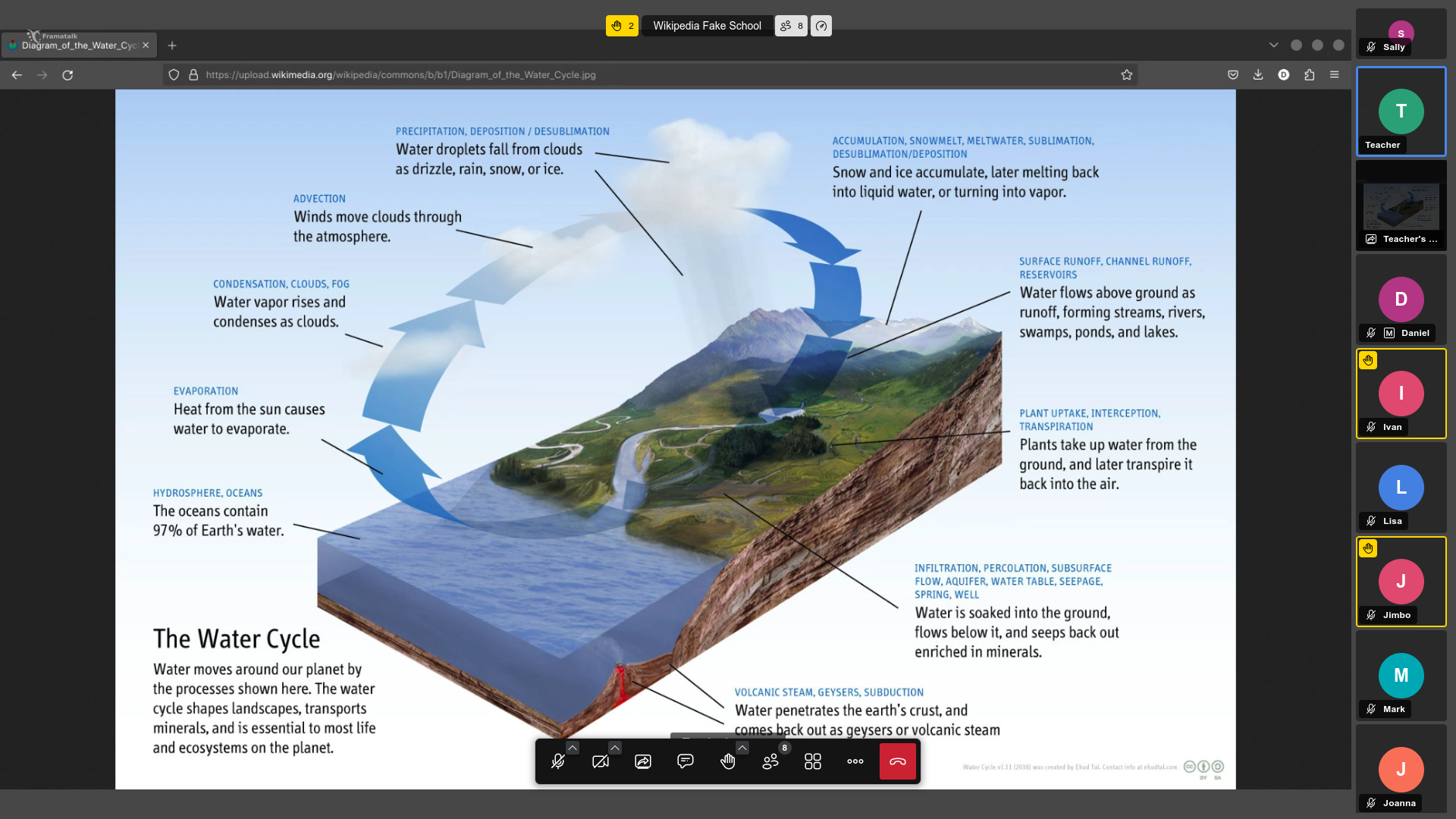
A staged example of an online classroom using Jitsi, where the teacher is sharing their screen

Efforts to slow the spread of COVID-19 through non-pharmaceutical interventions and preventive measures such as social-distancing and self-isolation have prompted the widespread closure of primary, secondary, and tertiary schooling in over 100 countries.

Previous outbreaks of infectious diseases have prompted, widespread school closings around the world, with varying levels of effectiveness. Mathematical models have shown that transmission may be delayed by closing schools. However, effectiveness depends on the contacts children maintain outside of school.

School closures appear effective in decreasing cases and deaths, particularly when enacted promptly. If school closures occur late relative to an outbreak, they are less effective and may not have any impact at all. Additionally, in some cases, the reopening of schools after a period of closure has resulted in increased infection rates. As closures tend to occur concurrently with other interventions such as public gathering bans, it can be difficult to measure the specific impact of school closures.

During the 1918–1919 influenza pandemic in the United States, school closures and public gathering bans were associated with lower total mortality rates. Cities that implemented such interventions earlier had greater delays in reaching peak mortality rates. Schools closed for a median duration of 4 weeks according to a study of 43 US cities' responses to the Spanish Flu. School closures were shown to reduce morbidity from the Asian flu by 90% during the 1957–58 outbreak, and up to 50% in controlling influenza in the US, 2004–2008.

Multiple countries successfully slowed the spread of infection through school closures during the 2009 H1N1 Flu pandemic. School closures in the city of Oita, Japan, were found to have successfully decreased the number of infected students at the peak of infection; however closing schools was not found to have significantly decreased the total number of infected students. Mandatory school closures and other social distancing measures were associated with a 29% to 37% reduction in influenza transmission rates. Early school closures in the United States delayed the peak of the 2009 H1N1 Flu pandemic. Despite the overall success of closing schools, a study of school closures in Michigan found that "district level reactive school closures were ineffective."

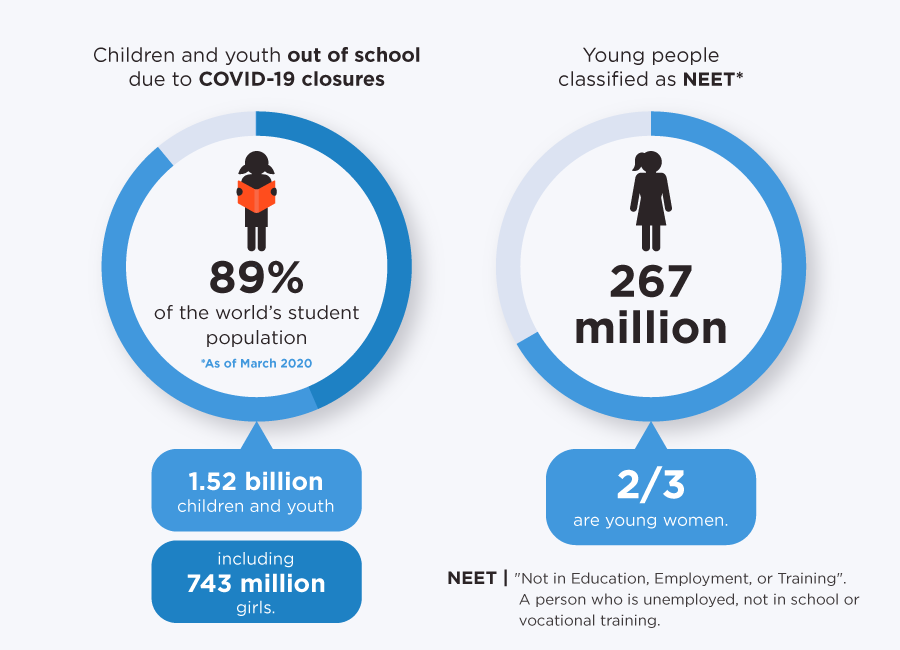
Children and youth out of school due to COVID-19 closures and young people classified as NEET

During the swine flu outbreak in 2009 in the UK, in an article titled "Closure of schools during an influenza pandemic" published in the Lancet Infectious Diseases, a group of epidemiologists endorsed the closure of schools in order to interrupt the course of the infection, slow further spread and buy time to research and produce a vaccine.

Having studied previous influenza pandemics including the 1918 flu pandemic, the influenza pandemic of 1957 and the 1968 flu pandemic, they reported on the economic and workforce effect school closure would have, particularly with a large percentage of doctors and nurses being women, of whom half had children under the age of 16. They also looked at the dynamics of the spread of influenza in France during French school holidays and noted that cases of flu dropped when schools closed and re-emerged when they re-opened. They noted that when teachers in Israel went on strike during the flu season of 1999–2000, visits to doctors and the number of respiratory infections dropped by more than a fifth and more than two fifths respectively.

== Hazard controls ==
Students in Indonesia went back to schools located in low-risk areas on the first day of school in 2021 under tight health protocols after the closure of education facilities for months due to the COVID-19 pandemic.

For schools and childcare facilities, the U.S. Centers for Disease Control and Prevention recommends short-term closure to clean or disinfect if an infected person has been in a school building regardless of community spread. When there is minimal to moderate community transmission, social distancing strategies can be implemented such as postponing or cancelling field trips, assemblies, and other large gatherings such as physical education or choir classes or meals in a cafeteria, increasing the space between desks, staggering arrival and dismissal times, limiting nonessential visitors, and using a separate health office location for children with flu-like symptoms. When there is substantial transmission in the local community, in addition to social distancing strategies, extended school dismissals may be considered.

As the pandemic progresses, schools may continue with remote learning or decide to reopen. Strategies such as cohorting, rotating schedules, eating lunch in the classroom, and utilizing outdoor spaces are some ways to minimize close contact. Additional precautions include face masks, hand sanitizer stations, rearranging classrooms to enable physical distancing, and frequent cleaning. The CDC made a School Decision Tree to aid administrators in the planning process for reopening. The American Academy of Pediatrics urges re-entry policies need to be flexible and responsive as new information about the virus emerges.

The National Academies of Sciences, Engineering, and Medicine states that in-person instruction for grades K-5 and students with special needs should be prioritized to prevent children from falling behind. Younger children are at higher risk of suffering from long-term academic consequences and developmental deficits without in-person learning.

== Academic integrity ==
The impact on academic integrity has been observed around the world. A rise in contract cheating, academic file-sharing, and exam cheating were identified as particularly problematic. With remote learning, cheating has become far easier for students. There is no remorse from students who would rather succeed in class than learn. Online education has also exposed various as yet unresolved legal issues, including copyright and unapproved misuse of lectures.

Many institutions turned to commercial services to take over exam proctoring, but almost immediately concerns were raised about student privacy, surveillance, and the impact on student mental health.

The lack of student to teacher interaction also led some students to feel less passionate about the integrity of their work. Some students turned in half-completed assignments, got the answers from friends in class, or turned in nothing at all simply because education became less important due to COVID-19.

Due to COVID-19, many students had problems with staying focused and lost their sense of routine. Many researchers believe this is not due to the school closures, but to "brain fog" caused by the disease itself.

Engagement and focus are vital to the learning process, and some students feel they focus better in in-person classes.

Students may interpret that lack of structure to mean that they do not have to do anything, or they may find themselves overwhelmed with too much to do and an inability to determine what order to do it in. However, some students thrived in this new environment with test scores that went up during online learning.

== Gender disparities ==
The COVID-19 lockdowns has widened the gender gap in education between females and males. The rapid spread of COVID-19 lockdowns forced many females into the traditional roles as caretakers. Common gender disparities that impact a female's education during the pandemic are finances enabling higher dropout rates, domestic violence, child marriage, early pregnancy, and exploitation of child labour.

Female caretakers drop out of schools to provide care for sick family members or become a source of income for their families. In settings with gender disparities in rates of school completion, girls are at increased risk of not returning to school after lockdown if tasked with income-generating activities or caretaking or they become pregnant. There is a correlation between increased unemployment rates with higher female school dropout rates. Malala Fund research estimates that as a result of the pandemic, 20 million girls in developing countries may never return to the classroom. Consequently, there is a decreased level of women returning to school, particularly in nations with poverty.

Out of the total population of students enrolled in education globally, UNESCO reported as of 31 March 2020 that over 89% were out of school because of COVID-19 closures. This represented 1.54 billion children, and youth enrolled in school or university, including nearly 743 million girls. During the pandemic, females attending school reported encountering technical challenges with remote learning. Using data from the National Study STEM faculty and students (NSSFS) collected 2020, the report describes gender disparities in experiences of transitioning to remote teaching/learning among US STEM faculty and students. According to the survey, females reported higher technical challenges in remote learning against their male counterparts. The two main areas that females found challenging in remote learning were adaptability to the course design and transitioning from face-to-face school to remote online learning curriculums.

Countries with poverty reported increased gender disparities as families could not afford internet usage in low-income households to pay for female education. Additionally, there was a preference in male over female education as they were seen as sole providers. Over 111 million of these girls are living in the world's least developed countries where getting an education is already a struggle. These are contexts of extreme poverty, economic vulnerability, and crisis where gender disparities in education are highest. In Mali, Niger, and South Sudan — 3 countries with some of the lowest enrolment and completion rates for girls — closures have forced over 4 million girls out of school.

The broadened gap in gender disparities impacts female education that will exceed beyond the pandemic and seep into their futures. There have been several efforts by UNESCO and other organizations to raise funds for female education, but due to the financial hardships of the pandemic, those efforts have fallen short. Lack of government involvement in the issue and inability to address the increasing concerns of gender disparities in education during the pandemic has limited educational opportunities for females globally.

The COVID-19 pandemic has had a considerable impact on female education. Female education relates to the unequal social norms and the specific forms of discrimination that girls face. In 2018, 130 million girls worldwide were out of school, and only two out of three girls were enrolled in secondary education. The COVID-19 pandemic may further widen the gaps and threatens to disrupt the education of more than 11 million girls. In addition, girls are less likely to have access to the Internet and online learning.

== Racial disparities ==
The impact of COVID-19 lockdowns on racial disparities in online learning during the pandemic has received research attention. A recent study from the Urban Institute covers some of these findings. Urban's study points to issues in access to a computer and internet. A 2018 survey of households showed that 48% of surveyed households of Alaskan Natives did not have access to computers compared to 35% of Black households, 35% Latino, and 19% White. Minimal access to computers and the internet was found in 1.3 to 1.4 times as many Black and Hispanic households with school-aged children as it was in white households, with more than two out of five low-income households having just limited access.

A 2021 report from the Black Education Research Collective analyses the impact of COVID-19 lockdowns on Black education. It evaluates how Black students, parents, educators and community members experience systemic racism during COVID. The study seeks to show how the pandemic has interrupted education across the country, highlighting existing racial and economic inequities. The study also argues that even before the outbreak, students in vulnerable neighborhoods, primarily Black, Indigenous, and other majority-minority areas, faced disparities in everything from resources (ranging from books to counselors) to student-teacher ratios and extracurricular activities.

== Timeline ==
- 26 January: China was the first country which instituted measures to contain the COVID-19 outbreak including extending the Spring Festival holiday and became the first to close all universities and schools around the country.

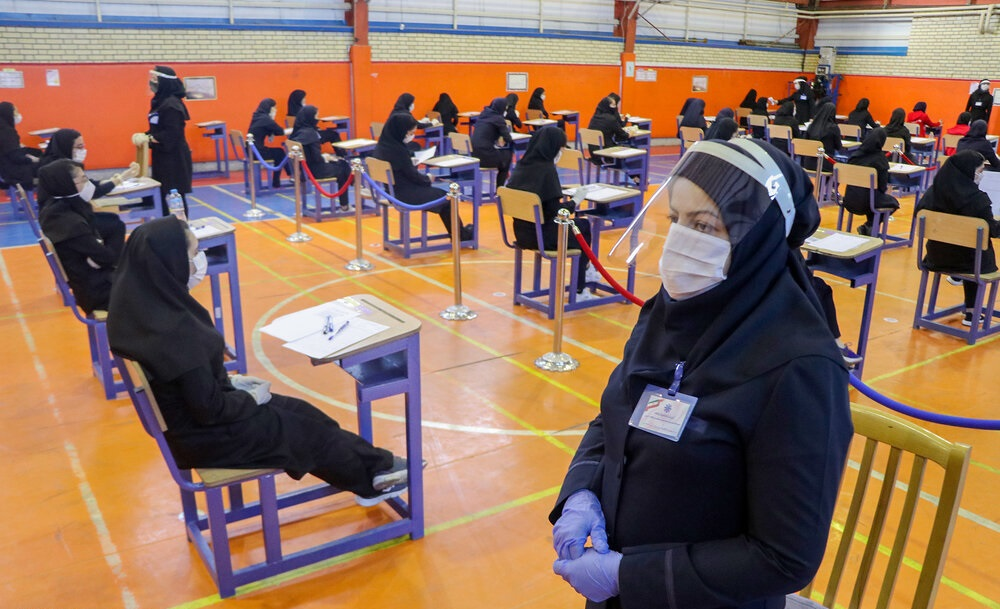
Students take end-of-year exams in Tabriz, Iran, 6 June 2020.

- 4 March: UNESCO released the first global numbers on school closures and affected students on 3 March. It reported that 22 countries on three continents had enacted preventive measures including the temporary closure of schools and universities, impacting 290.5 million students around the world. In reaction, UNESCO called on countries to support affected students and families and facilitate large-scale inclusive distance learning programmes.
- 5 March: The majority of learners affected by COVID-19 emergency measures were located in China, with 233 million learners affected, followed by Japan at 16.5 million and Iran at 14.5 million.
- 10 March: One in five students worldwide was "staying away from school due to the COVID-19 crisis" while another one in four was barred from higher education institutions, according to UNESCO.
- 13–16 March: National governments in 49 countries announced or implemented school closures on 13 March, including 39 countries which closed schools nationwide and 22 countries with localised school closures. By 16 March, this figure increased to 73 countries according to UNESCO.
- 19 March: A total of 50% of the students worldwide were affected by school closures, corresponding to nationwide closures in 102 countries and local closures in 11 countries affecting 1 billion people.
- 20 March: Over 70% of the world's learners were impacted by closures, with 124 country-wide school closures.
- 27 March: Nearly 90% of the world's student population was out of class.
- 29 March: More than 1.5 billion children and other students were affected by nationwide school closures. Others were disrupted by localized closures.
- Mid-April: A total of 1.58 billion students globally had been affected by the closure of schools and higher education institutions in response to the COVID-19 pandemic. Based on UNESCO Monitoring Reports, 200 countries implemented national closures, affecting about 94% of the world's student population. The percentage of students affected was as high as 99% for low and lower-middle income countries.
- 30 June: The CDC revised its guidelines for institutes of primary, secondary, and tertiary education, in which it expressly did not recommend the universal testing of students and staff. Rather, the CDC only recommended testing people who are exhibiting COVID-19 symptoms or who have come into contact with a known COVID-19 case.

== Consequences of school closures ==
School closures in response to the COVID-19 pandemic have shed a light on numerous issues affecting access to education, as well as broader socio-economic issues. As of 12 March, more than 370 million children and youth are not attending school because of temporary or indefinite country wide school closures mandated by governments in an attempt to slow the spread of COVID-19. As of 29 March, nearly 90% of the world's learners were impacted by closures.

According to the United Nations International Children's Fund (UNICEF), the COVID-19 pandemic has affected more than 91% of students worldwide, with approximately 1.6 billion children and youngsters unable to attend physical schools due to temporary closures and lockdowns.

Even when school closures are temporary, it carries high social and economic costs. The disruptions they cause affect people across communities, but their impact is more severe for disadvantaged children and their families including interrupted learning, compromised nutrition, childcare problems and consequent economic cost to families who cannot work. According to Studi Economici Dell'Ocse (OECD) studies, school performance hinges critically on maintaining close relationships with teachers. This is particularly true for students from disadvantaged backgrounds, who may not have the parental support needed to learn on their own. Working parents are more likely to miss work when schools close in order to take care of their children, incurring wage loss in many instances and negatively impacting productivity. Localised school closures place burdens on schools as parents and officials redirect children to schools that are open.

=== Strain on healthcare workforce ===
Women make up almost 70% of the healthcare workforce, exposing them to a greater risk of infection. They often cannot attend work because of childcare obligations that result from school closures. In fact, in the U.S., the healthcare sector has one of the highest rates of childcare obligations in the broader economy, with approximately 28.8% of the workforce responsible for providing care to children aged 3–12. At best, this means that school closures put pressure on health workers in systems already strained by COVID-19 caseloads. At worst, this means that some medical professionals may miss work at health facilities altogether.

=== Online learning ===
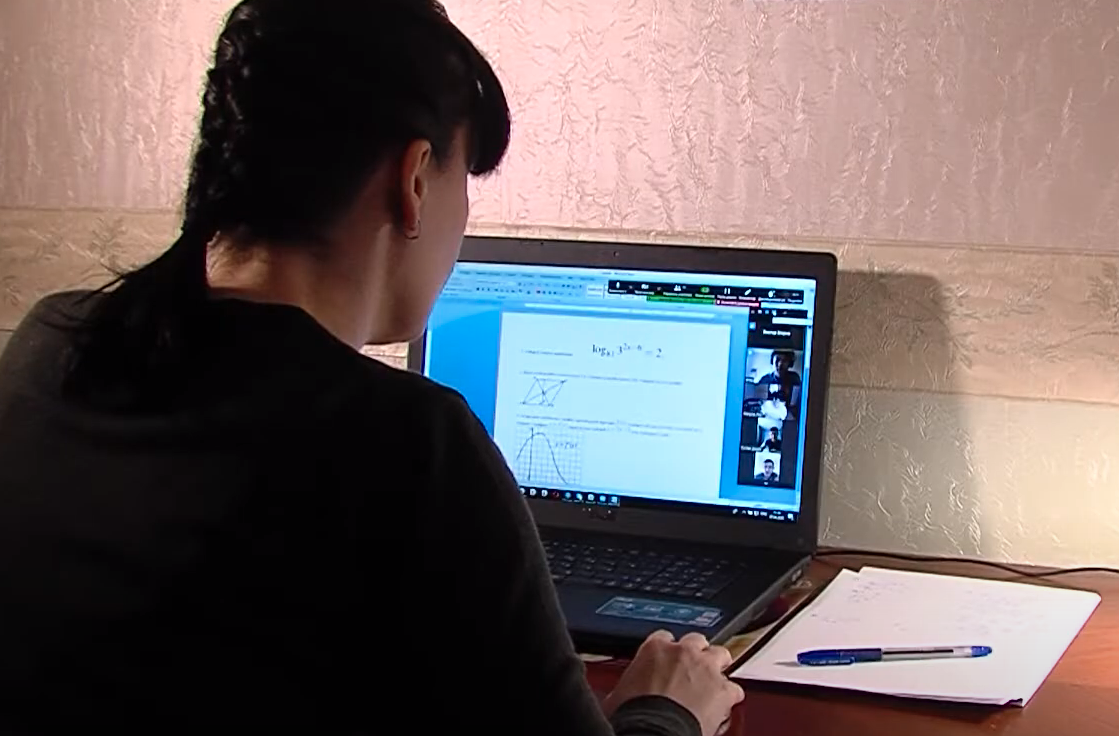
A math distance lesson over a video conference during the COVID-19 pandemic in Russia

Online learning has become a critical lifeline for education, as institutions seek to minimize the potential for community transmission. Technology can enable teachers and students to access specialized materials well beyond textbooks, in multiple formats and in ways that can bridge time and space. Digital media in education can take many forms, including high-tech solutions such as tablet-based adaptive learning software or low-tech solutions such as radio, sms, and instructional television. Teachers may operate in dual mode, teaching local and remote learners simultaneously.

Due to the COVID-19 pandemic, many schools across the world began conducting classes via videotelephony software such as Zoom, Google Classroom and/or Google Meet. The Organisation for Economic Co-operation and Development has created a framework to guide an education response to the COVID-19 pandemic for distance learning. Whenever this was possible, the ability to teach in real time significantly helped educators handle the transition, in comparison with their colleagues who had to rely on asynchronous instruction. In addition, studies have shown that online learning led to more proactive learning strategies for students, rather than passive learning at the urging of a teacher. By examining students' online learning behaviors, including student practices, students' perceptions of social belonging, and perceptions of the online learning learning climate, the results suggest that successful online learning can be achieved through a positive learning climate and strategies, as positive learning strategies create communication between students and between students and teachers.

Some online learning solutions like Coursera expanded their accessibility by offering more free online courses during the pandemic.

==== Unequal access to technology ====
Lack of access to technology or fast, reliable internet access can prevent students in rural areas and from disadvantaged families. Lack of access to technology or good internet connectivity is an obstacle to continued learning, especially for students from disadvantaged families. Teachers have reported that students are more likely to complete assignments if they have access to internet at home. In response to school closures caused by COVID-19, UNESCO recommends the use of distance learning programmes and open educational applications and platforms that schools and teachers can use to reach learners remotely and limit the disruption of education. However, in regions where online learning is not feasible, due to a lack of access to distance learning tools such as smart phones and internet connectivity, some parents have resorted to child labour or early marriage as a means to cope with the financial stress placed on them by the pandemic.

To aid in slowing the transmission of COVID-19, hundreds of libraries have temporarily closed. In the United States, numerous major cities announced public library closures, including Los Angeles, San Francisco, Seattle, and New York City, affecting 221 libraries. For students without internet at home, this increases the difficulty of keeping up with distance learning.

Yale economist Fabrizio Zilibotti co-authored a January 2022 study with professors from the University of Pennsylvania, Northwestern University and the University of Amsterdam, showing that unequal access to technology during "the pandemic is widening educational inequality and that the learning gaps created by the crisis will persist."

==== Copyright ====
Lack of limitations and exceptions to copyright can also have an impact on the ability of students to access the textbooks and materials they need to study. Several initiatives were taken to grant that students and teachers can have access to open educational resources, or understand copyright limitations. The International Council for Open and Distance Education issued a special website to provide webinars, tips for online teaching and resources for teachers.

In New Zealand, a group of publishers agreed to allow for virtual public readings of their materials from libraries and classrooms. A similar agreement took place in Australia, where the Australian Publishers Association, the Australian Library and Information Association and the Australian Society of Authors agreed on a set of exceptional measures to allow libraries to provide educational content. The Australian organization AMCOS agreed to give a gratis license for all their music sheets to all schools across Australia.

An advocacy organization in Netherlands launched a website to allow teachers use free-licensed music and video for their classes.

A coalition of over 500 civil society organizations and individuals issued a letter to Francis Gurry, Director of the World Intellectual Property Organization, asking, among other things, a special set of limitations and exceptions to copyright for the duration of the pandemic.

Several organizations are also working to explain to teachers how to navigate complex copyright scenarios. The National Copyright Unit of Australia, a specialist copyright team responsible for copyright policy and administration for Australian schools and TAFE, issued a set of recommendations to follow on copyright issues while doing remote learning and a set of recommendations for using openly licensed content, specially aimed to parents supporting students. Centrum Cyfrowe in Poland is holding open calls to support the work of teachers and educators leading in the open education sector. The Program on Information Justice and Intellectual Property at the American University is holding a set of webinars for different educators to guide them through copyright issues when delivering online teaching and how to address best practices for fair use.

=== Childcare ===
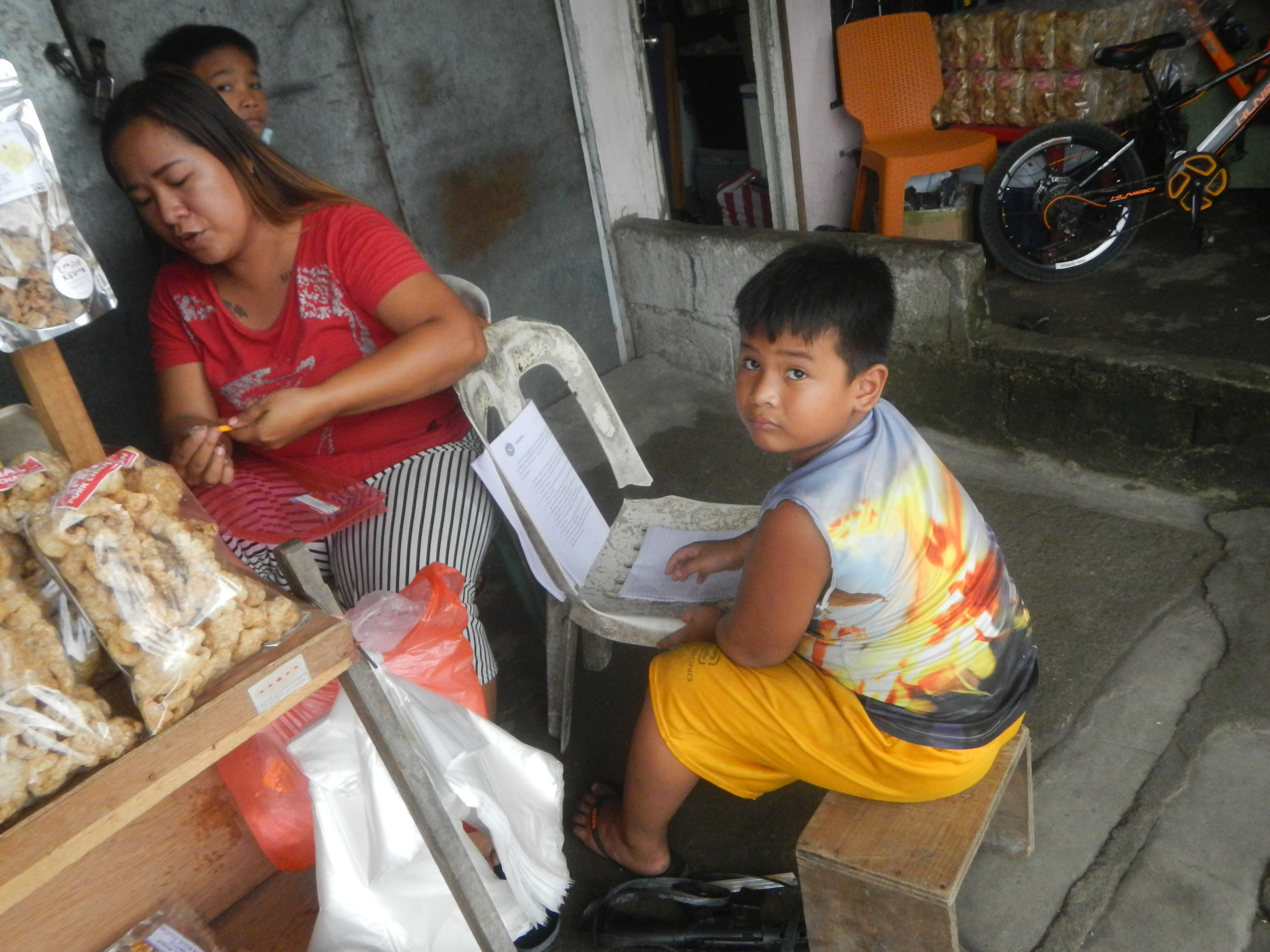
Filipino homeschooling students - blended (printed-digital modular) distance learning with self-learning materials during the 2020 COVID-19 pandemic in San Miguel, Bulacan

Closures of early childhood education and care as well as schools increases work-family conflicts particularly for parents with younger children who are in more need of care and supervision of distance learning. School closures puts a strain on parents and guardians to provide childcare and manage distance learning while children are out of school. In the absence of alternative options, working parents often leave children alone when schools close and this can lead to risky behaviours, including increased influence of peer pressure and substance abuse. Alternatively, in some emerging economies, parents may resort to bringing their children to work and engaging them in menial labour, as has been the case in Maharashtra, India, where some out-of-school teenagers have been working in sugar cane fields alongside their day labourer parents.

In the United States, as of early April, more than half of existing childcare programs had shut down at least temporarily and were not serving any children.

=== Women in the workforce ===
Many working mothers dropped out of the labour force to take care of their children during school closures and online learning. In places where part-time school attendance or fully virtual learning is implemented, working parents are typically left with a choice of either arranging childcare or to stop working during days when their children are not at school. However, childcare is often difficult to find or unaffordable, due to its increased demand and closures of daycare centres during the pandemic, making it not a viable option for many parents.

Due to the difficulty of securing accommodations and flexibility from their employers to allow them to take care of their children, women in the United States, particularly Black and Latina women, have lost a disproportionate share of jobs since the beginning of the pandemic. These include forced attritions from women being unable to meet their productivity goals, and voluntary resignations from women who face too much pressure from managing both their paid and unpaid responsibilities. In many cases, women in the workforce were unable to afford private childcare, hence necessitating them to take a leave of absence from work or resigning from their job. A spring 2021 academic study suggested that a much larger proportion of mothers left the workforce in US states where schools offered primarily remote education. Between February 2020 and 2021, more than 2.3 million women in the US have left the labour force. In January 2021, only 57% of American women participated in the labour force, the lowest rate in 33 years.

A study from Washington University in St. Louis found that mothers have reduced their paid working hours four to five times more than fathers from February to April 2020, which widened the gender gap in working hours by a maximum of 50%. According to authors of the study, the disparity may lead to droves of women leaving the workforce and massive layoffs for women. Betsey Stevenson, an economist at the University of Michigan, warned that the exodus of women from the workforce during the pandemic may lead to long-term impacts in women's labour market outcomes. Because working hours are a major cause of the gender pay gap, and periods of non-employment has adverse impacts on future earnings and job mobility, experts warn that the pandemic-induced reduction can set women's advancement back for decades.

=== Nutrition and food insecurity ===
Nutrition plays a critical role in cognitive development and academic performance for children. Many children worldwide rely on free or discounted meals at schools. When schools close, nutrition is especially compromised for children in schools where food is provided.

In the United States, school lunch programmes are the second-biggest anti-hunger initiative after food stamps. Every year, nearly 30 million children rely on schools to provide free or low-cost meals including breakfast, lunch, snacks, and even dinner. In Washington State, around 45% of the states 1.1 million students enrolled in traditional public and charter schools qualify for subsidised school meals. At least 520,000 students and their families may be affected by food insecurity as a result of school closures. In Alabama, where state-wide school closures as of 18 March have affected over 720,000 students, the state Superintendent announced that staff in schools disproportionately affected by poverty would create meal distribution networks to provide food for students who rely on school lunches.

Many families with low income qualified for school lunch programs funded by the federal government and subsidized at the state level. Schools were required to stay open amid the COVID-19 crisis to provide meals to children who qualified for free or reduced rate meals. School sent out a weekly survey to reach every student who might have qualified for the programme.

In the UK, footballer Marcus Rashford pushed the government to extend free school meals over the summer holidays in August. It was voted out at first, by 61 votes. However, in a U-turn, Boris Johnson's government changed it and agreed to carry on paying. Rashford was given an MBE for his efforts.

=== Student learning outcomes ===
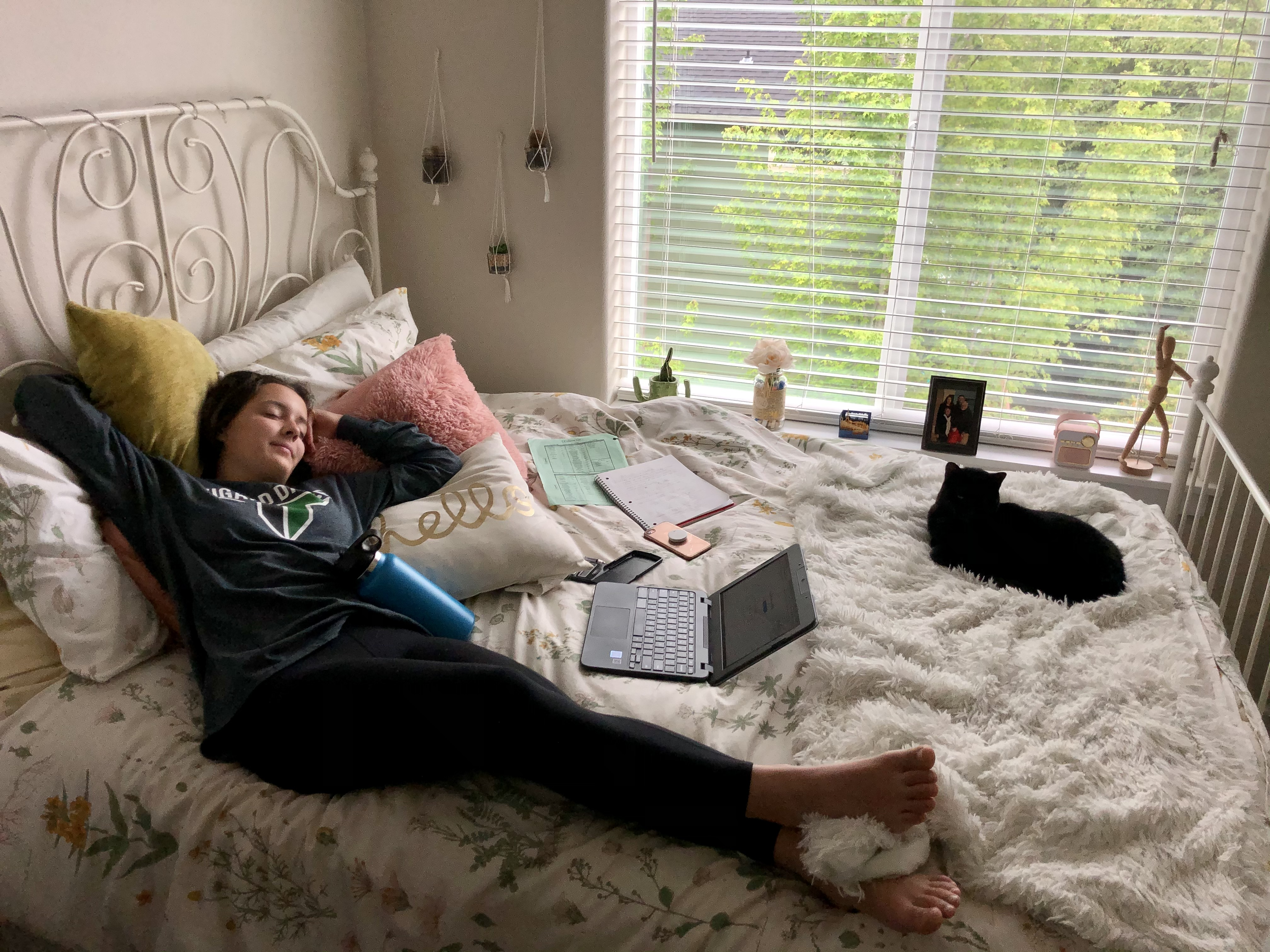
Student taking an online class in the US

School closures negatively impact student learning outcomes. Schooling provides essential learning and when schools close, children and youth are deprived opportunities for growth and development. The disadvantages are disproportionate for under-privileged learners who tend to have fewer educational opportunities beyond school. When schools close, parents are often asked to facilitate the learning of children at home and can struggle to perform this task. This is especially true for parents with limited education and resources.

Research has shown that learning loss continued throughout the COVID-19 pandemic. A review of 42 studies from 15 countries found that students experienced greater learning difficulties in mathematics than in reading. The review also found that students from lower socioeconomic backgrounds experienced greater learning loss than other students.

Students gain literacy slower during school closures than in a business-as-usual academic year. It has been estimated that the rate of reading ability gain in kindergarten children in the U.S. slows down by 66% during school closures compared to active schooling. A recent study of the effect of the 2005 Kashmir Earthquake found that school closures of an average of 14 weeks has resulted in affected children being 1.5 to 2 years behind their peers who were unaffected by the disaster and its resulting school closures. In practical terms, this learning loss could result in affected children earning 15% less in every adult year of their lives.

Student drop-out rates tend to increase as an effect of school closures due to the challenge of ensuring all students return to school once school closures ends. This is especially true of protracted closures. Disadvantaged, at-risk, or homeless children are more likely not to return to school after the closures are ended, and the effect will often be a life-long disadvantage from lost opportunities.

Schools are also hubs of social activity and human interaction. When schools are closed, many children and youth miss out on social contact that is essential to learning and development. Accordingly, teachers' perception of student coping significantly decreased with each education level handled, with university instructors finding their students to handle the situation much better than elementary school teachers did.

=== Inaccessibility to mitigation strategies ===
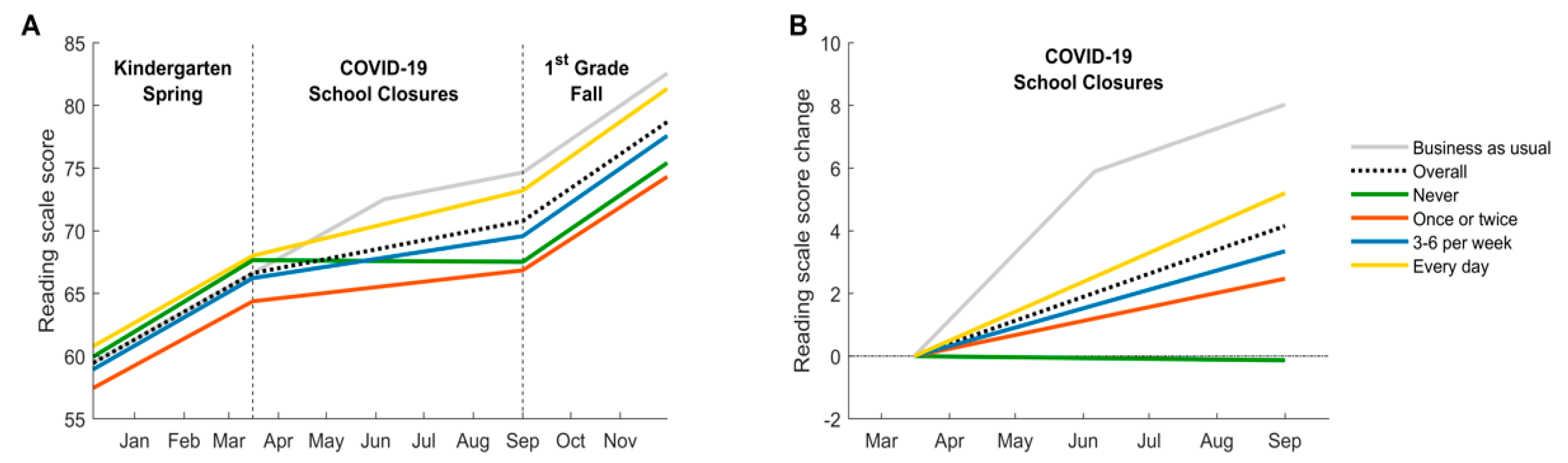
The predicted reading ability gain before, during, and after COVID-19 related school closures

The effect of school closure on academic achievement has been studied in the summer months. Many of the strategies used to prevent academic slump, such as attending summer school, visiting libraries, and/or participating in literacy-rich summer-based activities are not available during the pandemic. Reading every day to a child, an option available while staying at home, reduced the rate of loss by 42%.

=== Special education services ===
Potential impacts of school closures and reliance on distance learning are not addressed in US federal acts of legislation in the early months of the pandemic. Special education students are potentially one of the most impacted groups of COVID-19. Educators continue to focus on implementing strategies to deliver services and accommodations in virtual, hybrid, and in person settings. Studies show that children with special needs felt more socially isolated during the pandemic which had a significant impact on their mental health. However, information of how severe they have been affected, and how and if their grades will be affected due to their status and how this would affect their future are not specified.

=== Effect on COVID-19 cases and mortality ===
The effect of school closure on COVID-19 cases and mortality has been examined in multiple studies.

A mathematical modelling study investigated the impact of school closures on COVID-19 dynamics in 74 countries. It highlighted that the effect on infections, hospitalisations and deaths varied significantly by country. School closures were estimated to reduce SARS-CoV-2 infections, peak hospital occupancy, and deaths in most countries. However, the study also found that, in a few cases, school closures may have inadvertently increased cumulative COVID-19 mortality.

In a study that looked specifically at school closure in the United States, closure of schools was associated with 1.37 million fewer cases and 40,600 fewer deaths from COVID-19 in a six-week study period. However, two international studies examining the impact of reopening schools from kindergarten to grade 12 found no consistent relationship between the reopening of these schools and the spread of COVID-19, with another study from the United States showing no increased risk to childcare workers who continued to work. Other studies that looked at multiple policy changes have shown more modest changes associated with school closure.

== Impact on formal education ==
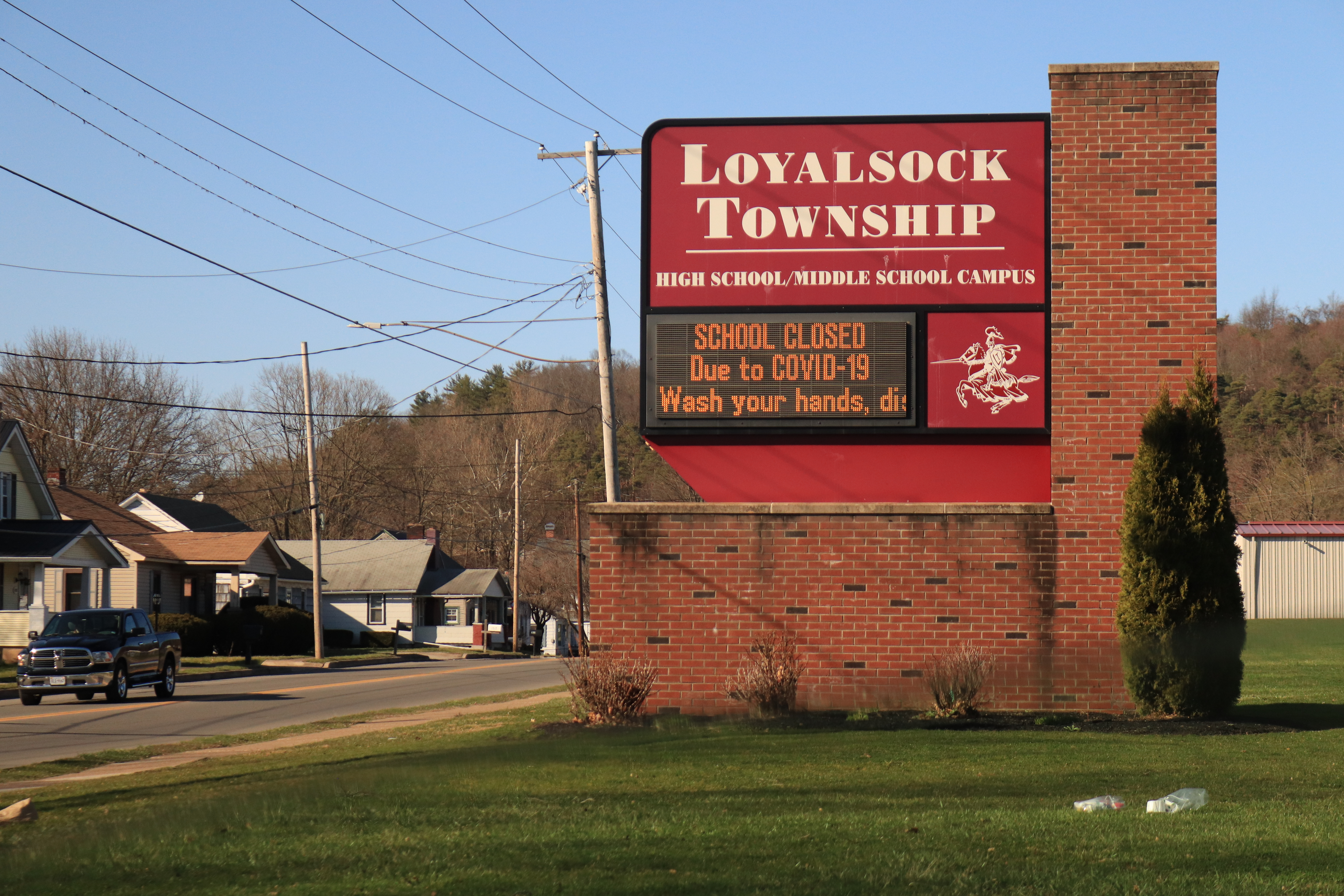
An electronic sign announces public school closures due to COVID-19 in Williamsport, Pennsylvania, United States.

Formal education — as opposed to informal education or non-formal education — tends to refer to schools, colleges, universities and training institutions. A 1974 report by the World Bank defined formal education as the following:

Formal education: the hierarchically structured, chronologically graded "education system", running from primary school through the university and including, in addition to general academic studies, a variety of specialised programmes and institutions for full-time technical and professional training.

The majority of data collected on the number of students and learners impacted by COVID-19 has been calculated based on the closure of formal education systems. The UNESCO Institute for Statistics provides figures on students impacted by COVID-19 corresponding to the number of learners enrolled at pre-primary, primary, lower-secondary, and upper-secondary levels of education (ISCED levels 0 to 3), as well as at tertiary education levels (ISCED levels 5 to 8).

=== Early childhood education ===
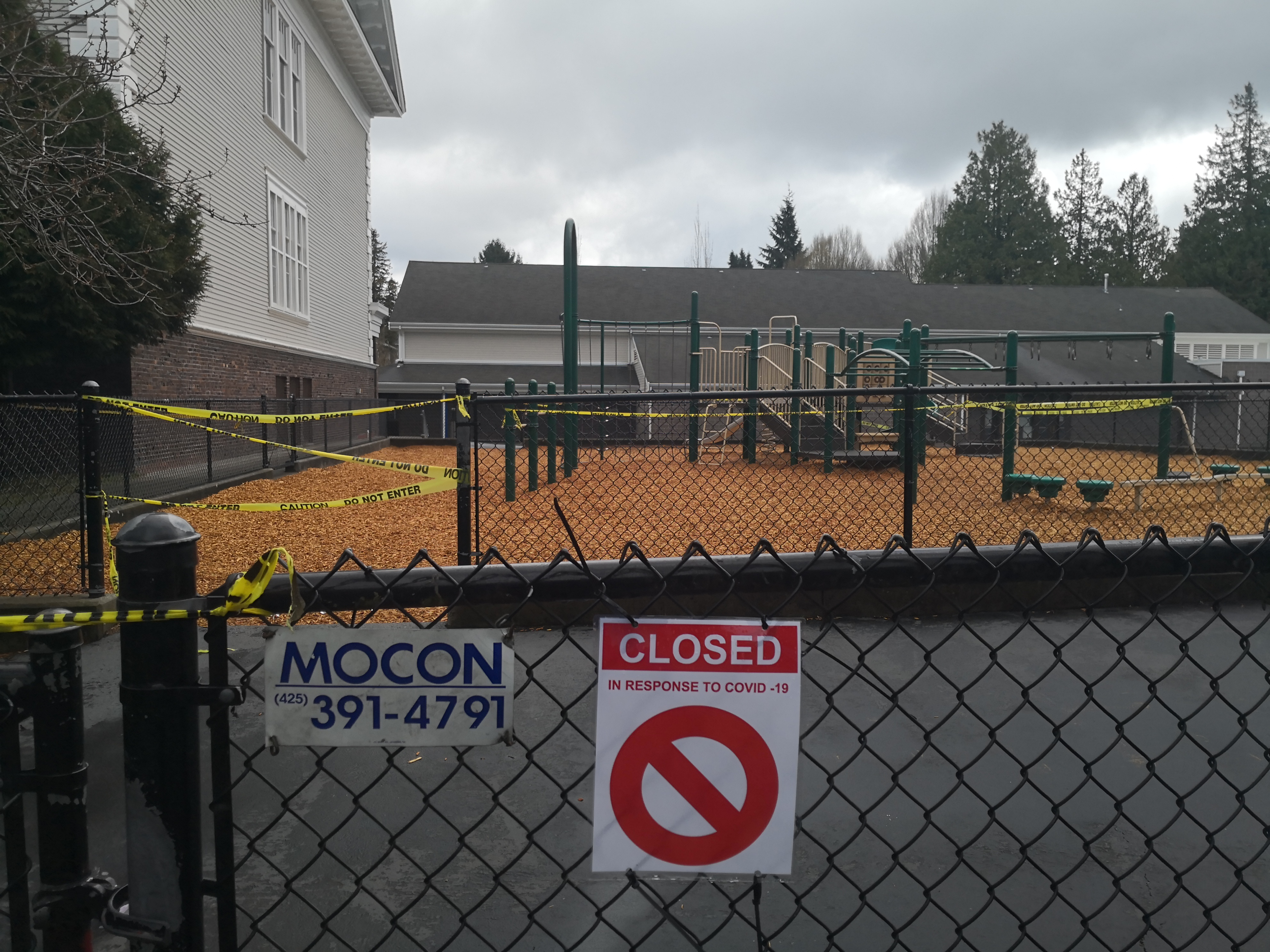
Playground at a Seattle elementary school is closed due to the epidemic on 25 March 2020.

Early childhood educational programmes are usually designed for children below the age of 3 and may refer to preschools, nursery schools, kindergartens, and some day care programmes. While many primary and secondary schools have closed around the world due to COVID-19, measures impacting early childhood educational programmes have varied. In some countries and territories for instance in Australia preschools and day cares are considered necessary services and have not closed in tandem with broader school closure measures.

In the United States, the Washington State Department of Children, Youth, and Families encouraged child care and early learning centres to stay open. Some school districts may offer alternative child care options, prioritising the children of first responders and healthcare workers. The governor of Maryland mandated that specific child care services remain open for the children of emergency personnel while Washington State and California have left it to the discretion of care providers. California Governor Gavin Newsom explained his state's position, saying "We need our child care facilities, our daycare centers, to operate to absorb the impact of these school closures." Colorado has encouraged the development of "tool kits" for parents to use at home to emulate the lessons children would have received in their early learning programmes. Over a million eligible American children were not enrolled in kindergarten for the 2021–2022 school year. The 2022 annual Report on the Condition of Education conducted by the National Center for Education Statistics (NCES) for the U.S. Department of Education indicates that, during 2019 to 2020, there was a 13% decrease in enrollment for eligible students aged three and four, from 54% to 40%.

In Japan, Prime Minister Shinzo Abe closed all schools throughout the country until 8 April, however, children's daycare facilities were excluded. In early March, five adults associated with a nursing facility for preschool children in Kobe tested positive for coronavirus. After testing over one hundred children at the facility, a preschool student was found to be carrying the virus.

=== Primary (or Elementary) Education ===
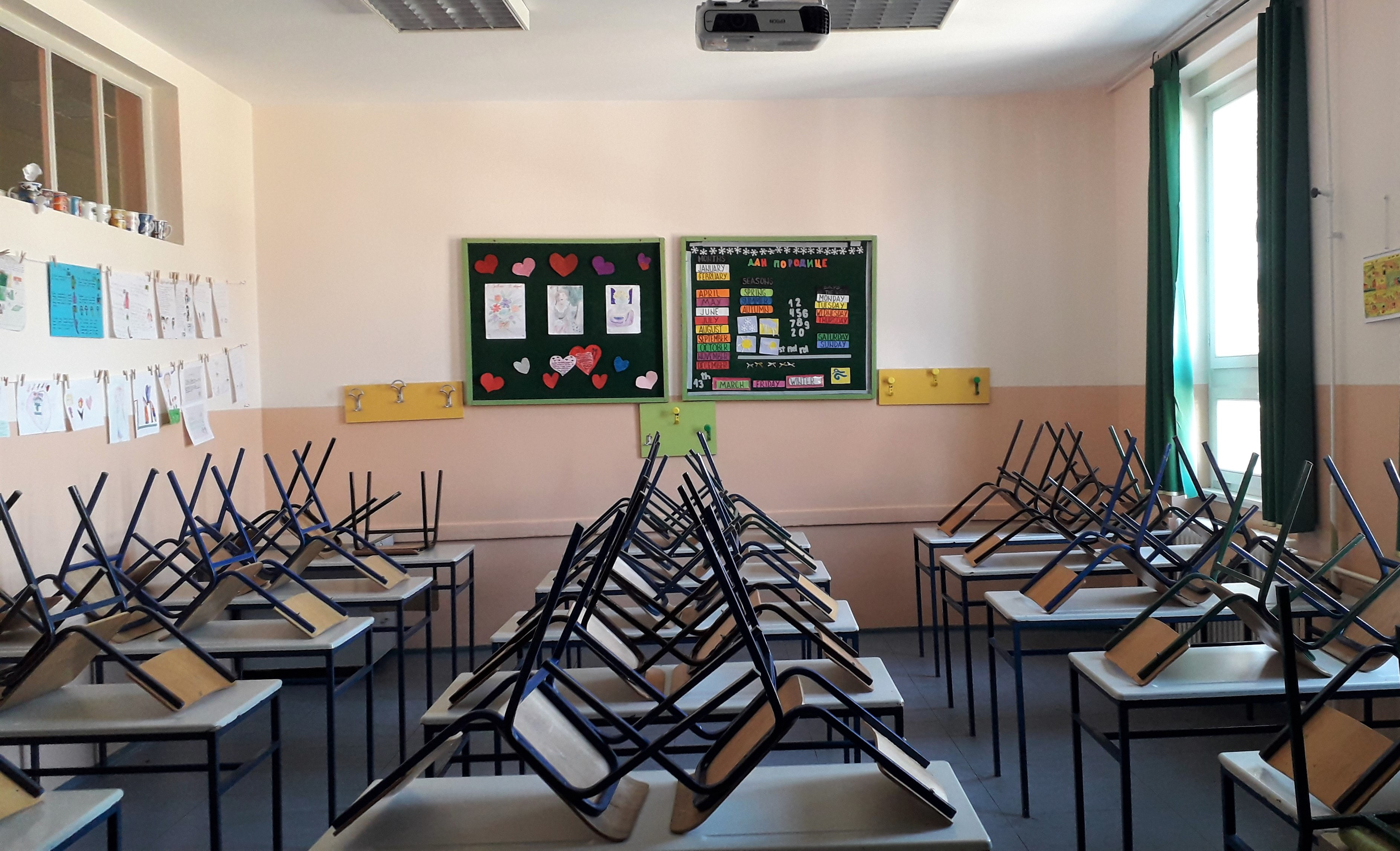
An empty classroom in closed elementary school due to COVID-19 in Kikinda, Serbia

Primary or elementary education typically consists of the first four to seven years of formal education. Kindergarten is the first time children participate in formal education. Based on a comparison of longitudinal literacy data in kindergarten-aged students during a spring semester of schooling versus during summer vacation, one study predicted that COVID-19 school closures would slow the rate of literacy ability gain by 66% in kindergarten children in the absence of mitigating alternative educational strategies. The study estimates that over an 8-month period from 1 January to 1 September 2020, assuming school closures from 16 March to 1 September 2020 (and taking into account the summer vacation that would have still normally taken place during that time), that these kindergarten children would have gained 31% less literacy ability on average than if school closures had not occurred. In the United States, there was a 6% decrease in kindergarten enrollment rates for the 2019 - 2020 school year for those aged five, dropping from 91% to 84%.

== Inequalities in Education ==
=== Pre-Tertiary Education Inequality ===
The COVID-19 pandemic significantly increased existing inequalities in pre-tertiary education. Between March 2020 and February 2021, schools worldwide faced closures for an average of 95 days, severely disrupting traditional learning environments. In many Western countries, schools relied on remote learning, yet this shift revealed massive disparities in technology access and interpersonal interaction. Many studies report negative consequences on children's development due to these school closures. Moreover, research highlights that children from lower socio-economic backgrounds experienced more developmental setbacks, as they often lacked access to necessary technology and a productive learning environment. For instance, lower-class parents in the United Kingdom spent less time helping their children with schoolwork than middle-class parents – further widening the educational inequality gap. This intersection between socio-economic status and educational outcomes can create long-term problems of absolute mobility, as children from disadvantaged backgrounds may face challenges in exceeding their parents’ achievements, thereby restricting their opportunities to move up to a higher socio-economic class.

=== Early Education Inequality ===
A study conducted in Israel aimed to examine how the shift to distance learning during the COVID-19 pandemic affected the language abilities in early childhood, specifically children from low socioeconomic status families. Researchers compared the linguistic skills – vocabulary and morphological awareness– of children who attended early education before the pandemic with those who experienced the interruption in learning during it. The results revealed that mid-COVID-19 children scored significantly lower in morphological awareness (between 20% and 61%) particularly in verb derivation, compared to their pre-pandemic peers. These gaps were attributed to less learning hours, reduced social interaction and additional challenges related to distance learning. Earlier studies have shown that early education is crucial for children's academic and social-emotional development, especially for those from low SES backgrounds who struggled to compensate for missed school hours at home. Parents of these children lacked time and resources to effectively assist their children with remote learning. As a result, this study concluded that children from lower socioeconomic status families were disproportionately affected, due to less access to learning resources as well as parental support during distance learning. The findings of this study highlight the critical need for targeted educational support – specifically for low SES children – involving both parents and teachers to support language development.

=== Primary Education Inequality ===
A study done in the Netherlands analysed the differences in learning gains from children in primary education from lower-educated and poorer parents as compared to high educated parents and wealthier families. The study looked at gains in education in reading, spelling, and math, using standardized test scores for approximately 300,000 students. The results demonstrate that children with less educated parents faltered in their learning gains, particularly in math and spelling, as compared to their higher income peers. Students were more dependent on their parents’ help during online learning, so those with less educated parents were at an unfair disadvantage. Additionally, children's learning was impacted by household income where those children whose families were in the middle to upper class experienced greater gains in spelling and math while lower income children did not. The disparity in educational gains based on family income can be attributed to wealthier families’ ability to pay for additional help and materials for their children while schooling from home.

=== Inequality in Secondary Education ===
An additional study done in Colombia looked at inequality during COVID-19 on students at the secondary-level. The study used standardized exams to examine educational inequality and found an increase of inequality between 48% to 372% depending on the independent variable. Results find that the change in educational inequality increased by 48% during the pandemic between low-income and high-income households. Another result of the study was the inequality between private and public school's. Prior to COVID-19 it was found that the educational differences between the school's were statistically insignificant while after 2020, there was a significant increase in the inequality divide –– by roughly 372%. This study has implications for how to increase the levelling of schooling in public schools and for lower income children, potentially hiring better teachers or increasing educational infrastructure to help the vulnerable students. Additionally, the study has implications for how there is a rationing of sufficient education in private institutions that contributes to inequality.

=== Grade deflation ===
However, the IBO came under heavy criticism worldwide for their methods in calculating the students' final grades and their "Enquiry upon results" (EUR) strategy after results were released on 6 July 2020. Consequently, many students not only received much lower grades than what they were predicted to by their teachers but also missed the entrance requirements to every university they applied to, affecting approximately 170,000 students in 153 countries. As a result, petitions that garnered dozens of thousands of signatures were created online with the hashtag "IBSCANDAL" becoming viral, schools and people have lost confidence with the education company and are considering other alternatives for secondary education, and educational reforms are being suggested where students will deviate away from taking significant examinations in the future.

== Higher education ==
Tertiary education, also known as higher education, refers to the non-compulsory educational levels that follow completion of secondary school or high school. Tertiary education is normally taken to include undergraduate and postgraduate education, as well as vocational education and training. Individuals who complete tertiary education generally receive certificates, diplomas, or academic degrees.

For higher education, the preparation of the future workforce is a key priority. Many occupations rely on education that has been supported through campus-focused activities such as face-to-face interactions with other students, work-integrated learning, and further hands-on exercises. For example, the healthcare workforce of doctors, nurses, and allied health professionals have been trained by in-person observations - similar to the apprenticeship model. In-person education has been shown to create stronger student-tutor and student-student interactions and relationships, which can promote better engagement. With COVID-19 and the pivot to distance learning, a similar level of depth is highly difficult to achieve. More evidence on feasibility, benefits, and obstacles is needed to analyse the drivers of economic impact for the various types of initiatives introduced in online education.

=== Undergraduate education ===
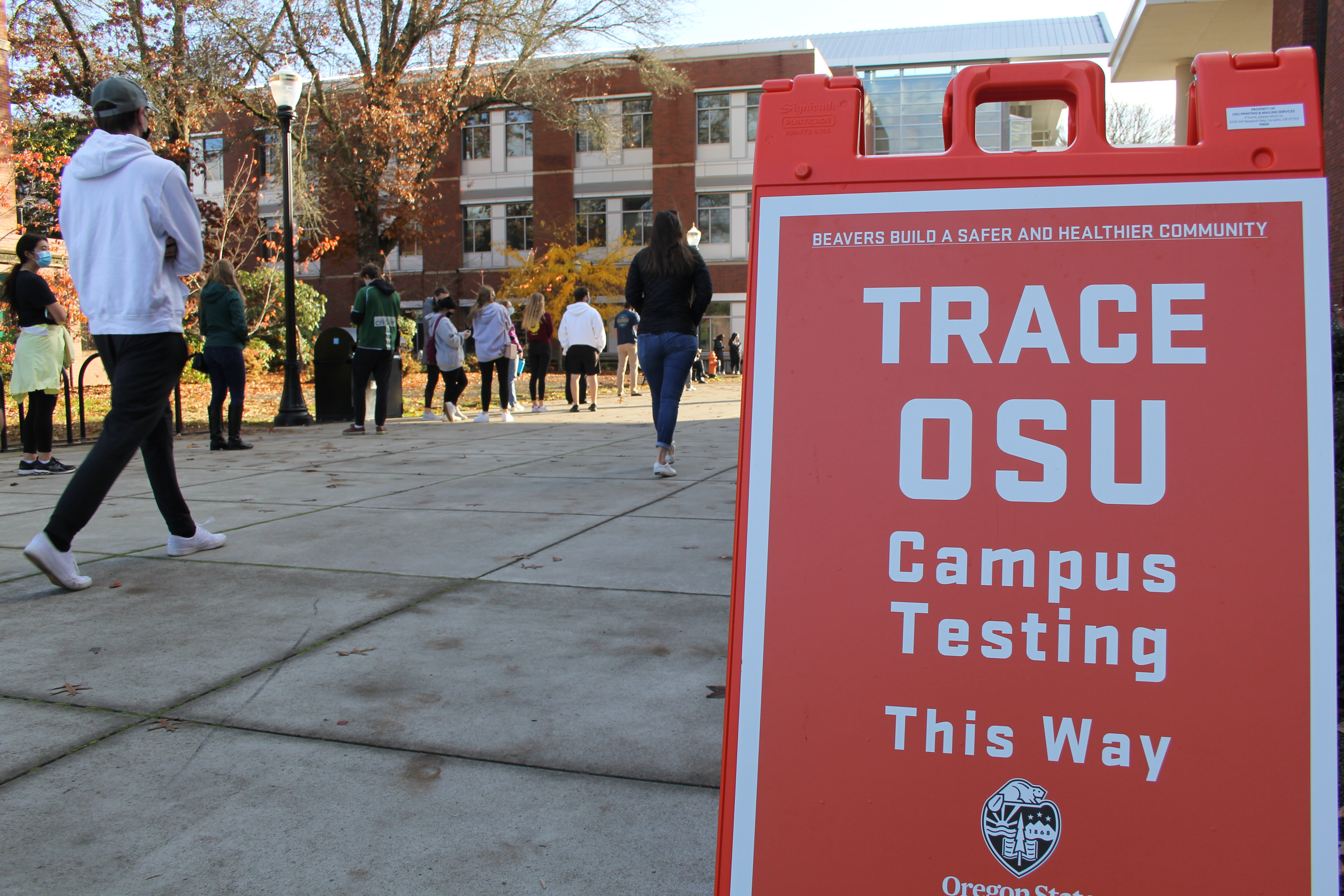
Sign at Oregon State University directing students to testing site

Undergraduate education is education conducted after secondary education and prior to post-graduate education, for which the learner is typically awarded a bachelor's degree.

The closure of colleges and universities has widespread individual, organizational, and learning and teaching implications for students, faculty, administrators, and the institutions themselves. The initial period of rapid adaption during 2020 contained three primary responses to COVID-19: minimal legal response, delayed commencement of study periods, and rapid digitalization of curriculum. Thoughts about what to make of this situation resulted in optional learning online or in person depending on what the university declared as being mandatory.

Millions of students are expected to defer the start of their studies for their undergraduate degree to a later year due to the pandemic. This not only will negatively affect the future university intake process due to shortages in places available but universities worldwide are expected to lose billions of USD in equivalent due to the number of students expected to study at university in the 2020–2021 academic year.

Colleges and universities across the United States have been called upon to issue refunds to students for the cost of tuition and room and board.

While $6 billion in emergency relief is to be made available to students during the pandemic, Education Secretary Betsy DeVos decided on 21 April 2020 that it will only be made available to those students who are also already eligible for federal financial aid. This rule will exclude tens of thousands of undocumented students who participate in the government's Deferred Action for Childhood Arrivals (DACA, or "Dreamers") program from being able to receive emergency relief funds.

Apart from colleges losing vast amounts of income undergraduate students themselves have lost vast amounts of imperative education due to COVID-19. With the lack of regular education amongst all students, learning seems harder to manage. Before the COVID-19 pandemic, college students would have in-person classes, in-person office hours, and in-person extracurricular activities. However, the pandemic has created an atmosphere where students who have an idea about their future occupation, are learning essential information behind a screen. These changes have made focusing on classes built around a students selected major very difficult, as they are not experiencing what they are passionate about to the fullest extent. The result of this is lost passion for specific subjects, the inability to focus on crucial information, and tainted academic integrity all over.

== Education in different countries ==
=== Private schools in the United States ===
One effect of the COVID-19 outbreak in the United States was in the form of increases in private school enrollment. Many parents who sought out private school instruction needed a place to send their child due to the parents need to work outside of the home.

An unintended consequence of this migration to private schooling is the widening inequality gap between families that can afford private school tuition and those who cannot. These families often had their children at home in virtual learning environments. Issues like poor broadband connection and the inability for parents to properly support their children's learning due to lack of English language skills or work conflicts saw certain students fall behind academically.

=== Primary and secondary schools in Kenya ===
A study on "teachers' and parents' preparedness to support virtual learning during the COVID-19 pandemic in Kenya" shows that most parents and teachers were not prepared to support virtual learning. This issue affected all schools: public 8-4-4 schools, private 8-4-4 schools, international schools, and private schools in the country. This points to a weak support system for virtual education in Kenyan schools during COVID-19 outbreak affecting virtual learning delivery.

== Impact on local economies ==
In the United States of America, colleges and universities operate as "mini-cities" which generate significant revenue for cities, states, and regions. For example, Princeton University estimated in 2017 that it contributed $1.58 billion USD per year to the New Jersey economy, and that students spent about $60 million in off-campus spending. College and university closures had a domino effect on economies with far-reaching implications.

In March, Linda Bilmes of the Harvard Kennedy School noted that "local hotels, restaurants, cafes, shops, car rental agencies and other local businesses obtain a significant share of annual revenue from graduation week and college reunions... these communities will suffer a lot of economic damage if the colleges remain closed at that time."

Small towns which rely on college students to support the local economy and provide labour to local businesses were especially impacted by school closures and the exodus of students from campus. In Ithaca, New York, Cornell University students spent at least $4 million a week in Tompkins County. In the wake of Cornell's decision to keep students home following spring break and transition to virtual instruction, the Mayor of Ithaca called for "immediate and forceful federal action — we will see a horrific economic impact as a result of Cornell University closing."

== Responses to the crisis ==
=== UNESCO recommendations ===
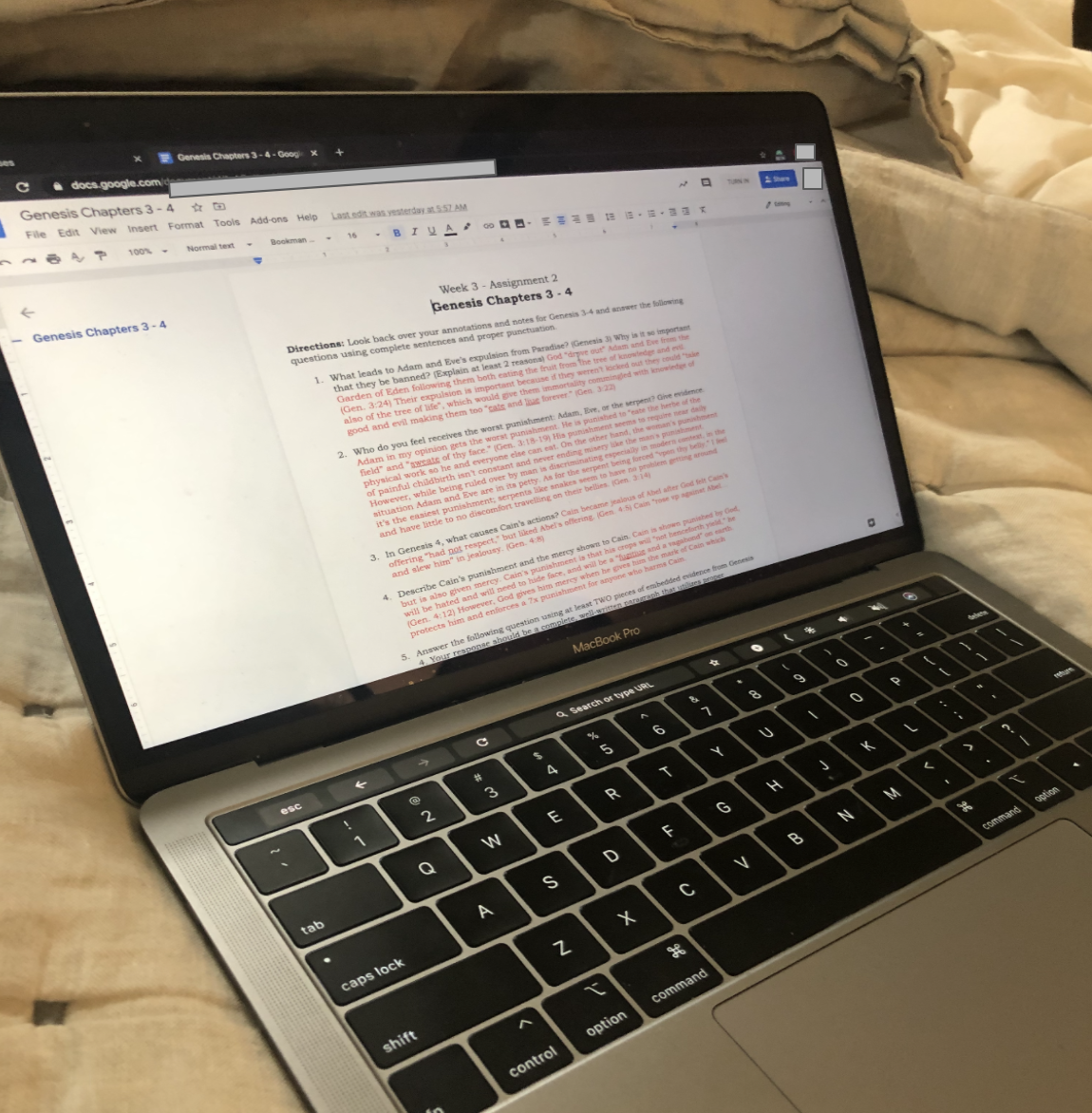
Digital assignment during COVID-19 pandemic in a Texas public school

UNESCO made ten recommendations for engaging in online learning:

1. Examine the readiness and choose the most relevant tools: Decide on the use high-technology and low-technology solutions based on the reliability of local power supplies, internet connectivity, and digital skills of teachers and students. This could range through integrated digital learning platforms, video lessons, MOOCs, to broadcasting through radios and TVs.
2. Ensure inclusion of the distance learning programmes: Implement measures to ensure that students including those with disabilities or from low-income backgrounds have access to distance learning programmes, if only a limited number of them have access to digital devices. Consider temporarily decentralising such devices from computer labs to families and support them with internet connectivity.
3. Protect data privacy and data security: Assess data security when uploading data or educational resources to web spaces, as well as when sharing them with other organisations or individuals. Ensure that the use of applications and platforms does not violate students' data privacy.
4. Prioritize solutions to address psychosocial challenges before teaching: Mobilize available tools to connect schools, parents, teachers, and students with each other. Create communities to ensure regular human interactions, enable social caring measures, and address possible psychosocial challenges that students may face when they are isolated.
5. Plan the study schedule of the distance learning programmes: Organise discussions with stakeholders to examine the possible duration of school closures and decide whether the distance learning programme should focus on teaching new knowledge or enhance students' knowledge of prior lessons. Plan the schedule depending on the situation of the affected zones, level of studies, needs of students needs, and availability of parents. Choose the appropriate learning methodologies based on the status of school closures and home-based quarantines. Avoid learning methodologies that require face-to-face communication.
6. Provide support to teachers and parents on the use of digital tools: Organise brief training or orientation sessions for teachers and parents as well, if monitoring and facilitation are needed. Help teachers to prepare the basic settings such as solutions to the use of internet data if they are required to provide live streaming of lessons.
7. Blend appropriate approaches and limit the number of applications and platforms: Blend tools or media that are available for most students, both for synchronous communication and lessons, and for asynchronous learning. Avoid overloading students and parents by asking them to download and test too many applications or platforms.
8. Develop distance learning rules and monitor students' learning process: Define the rules with parents and students on distance learning. Design formative questions, tests, or exercises to monitor closely students' learning process. Try to use tools to support submission of students' feedback and avoid overloading parents by requesting them to scan and send students' feedback
9. Define the duration of distance learning units based on students' self-regulation skills: Keep a coherent timing according to the level of the students' self-regulation and metacognitive abilities especially for livestreaming classes. Preferably, the unit for primary school students should not be more than 20 minutes, and no longer than 40 minutes for secondary school students.
10. Create communities and enhance connection: Create communities of teachers, parents, and school managers to address sense of loneliness or helplessness, facilitate sharing of experience and discussion on coping strategies when facing learning difficulties.

=== Open Education Community response ===
Open Education community members have shared open educational resources (OER) in response to COVID-19, including:

- Commonwealth of Learning created the resource "Keeping the doors of learning open". The project brings together a curated list of resources for policymakers, school and college administrators, teachers, parents and learners that will assist with student learning during the closure of educational institutions. Most of these are available as OER.
- Community Contributed Open Educational Resources for Teaching and Learning in the COVID-19 Era is a co-created spreadsheet of resources. There are multiple tabs on the spreadsheet providing links to: K-12 (primary / secondary) resources, OER repositories, OER toolkits, student support, online teaching, and more.
- OERu online courses is a resource to build capacity in the design and development of OER-enabled online learning. The OERu offers two facilitated online courses including free access to a competency certification in copyright and Creative Commons licensing. These courses will provide skills for participants wanting to design and publish their own online courses using the OERu's open source, component-based digital learning environment.
- Teaching and Learning Online is a website by SkillsCommons and MERLOT that offers a free online resource page in response to COVID-19. This page helps teachers and students prepare to start teaching and learning online.
- The University of Arizona University Libraries created a "Library Support for Shifting to Online Teaching" page and a Free-to-Use Course Materials webinar.
- WirLernenOnline is a German online platform to find learning material for digital lessons in primary school, secondary school, upper secondary and vocational education.

== Online learning platforms ==
Many educational institutions adopted online platforms and tools to continue teaching during the pandemic. Governments and private organizations also provided initiatives to bridge the digital divide and ensure students could access education.

=== Coursera ===
With schools closed, demand for online education platforms has increased. Coursera, which can be taught online, also grew significantly during the pandemic.

- Coursera saw 59% revenue growth year over year, largely due to a pandemic-induced boom in digital learning.
- Total registered users in 2020 grew 65% over 2019.
- During the pandemic, Coursera also partnered with more than 330 government agencies across 70 countries and 30 US states and cities as part of the Coursera Workforce Recovery Initiative.

=== Zoom ===
The need for a platform for video conferences and facilitating online classrooms was created by the pandemic. Zoom had significantly grown from a lesser-known work software to one of the most popular video conferencing applications.

- In December in 2019, Zoom had just 10 million daily meeting participants. This number increased significantly due to the pandemic moving classrooms and workspaces online to 350 million.
- At the peak of online learning within the pandemic, there were more than 90,000 schools using Zoom.

=== Google Classroom ===
The closure of schools created a need for a virtual classroom portal, and Google Classroom served that purpose for many schools. It offered teachers features such as the integration of the Google Suite along with learning management tools for uploading and submitting assignments. Another factor that helped Google Classroom become a large option for schools is the integration with Chromebooks that many schools had already utilized before the pandemic.

- From 2020 to 2021, Google Classroom saw an increase from 40 million to over 150 million users

In India, initiatives like the National Level Common Entrance Examination (NLCEE) provided free online coaching to students during the pandemic. By offering scholarships and virtual career guidance, NLCEE supported underprivileged students in continuing their education and preparing for competitive exams despite the disruptions caused by COVID-19.

== Vaccination ==
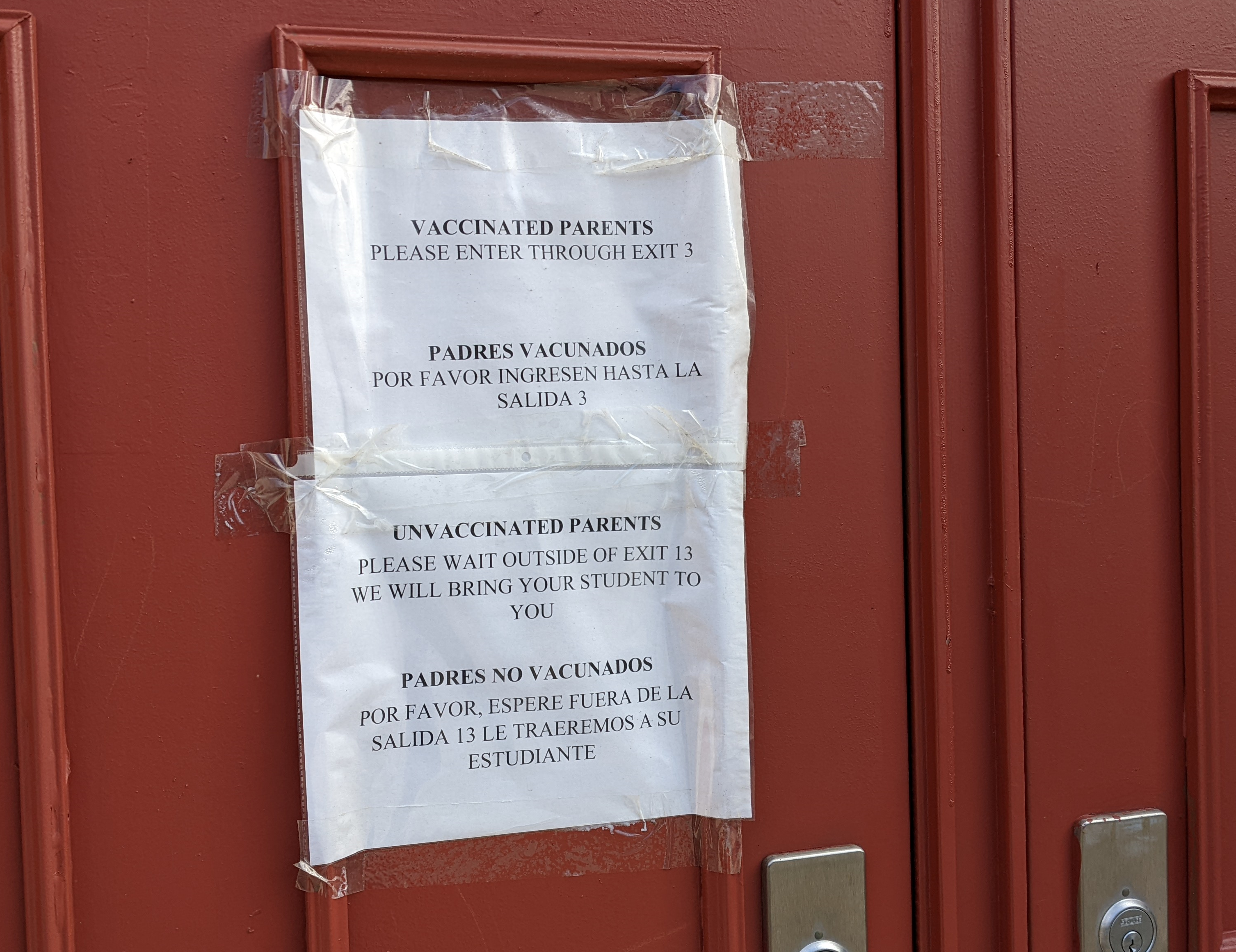
Divergent after-school pickup instructions for vaccinated and unvaccinated parents at an elementary school in New York City

Over 1000 colleges in the United States required on-campus students to be fully-vaccinated against COVID-19 for the 2021–2022 academic year. Of those 1000 schools, over 300 also require that students receive a booster shot. These mandates came after over 700,000 COVID cases were linked to U.S. colleges from the start of the pandemic to the end of May 2021. Many of these colleges also required staff and faculty to be fully vaccinated as well, especially after federal vaccine mandates were announced in November 2021.

All states have laws that require that universities offer medical exemptions to the vaccine mandate and most also require that Universities offer religious exemptions to the mandate. Universities took varied approaches to disciplining students who did provide proof of vaccination or have an approved medical or religious exemption. The University of Virginia disenrolled students who did not follow the mandate including 49 students who had already been enrolled in classes for the Fall 2021 semester.

== School closures ==
Weeks of school closure due to the COVID-19 pandemic in G20 countries

=== Country-wide closures ===
Country-wide school closures by country/territory
Countries and territories	Number of learners enrolled from pre-primary to upper-secondary education	Number of learners enrolled in tertiary education programmes	Additional information	Ref
Afghanistan	9,608,795	370,610		
Albania	520,759	131,833	Schools were closed for two weeks.	
Algeria	9,492,542	743,640		
Argentina	11,061,186	3,140,963		
Armenia	437,612	102,891		
Austria^{g}	1,278,170	430,370	Schools were closed in March. They re-opened in May.	
Azerbaijan	1,783,390	200,609		
Bahrain	247,489	44,940		
Bangladesh	36,786,304	3,150,539	Schools and universities are closed.	
Belgium	2,457,738	526,720	Schools were closed but nurseries remained open. Schools reopened on 1 September.	
Bhutan	176,488	11,944		
Bolivia	2,612,837	—^{a}		
Bosnia and Herzegovina	428,099	95,142	Both schools and universities are closed. Primary schools until the 4th grade reopened on 1 September. Secondary schools reopened 2 weeks after but due to the declaration of a second lockdown in October 2020, it returned online until further notice.	
Bulgaria	974,469	249,937	Both schools and universities are closed.	
Burkina Faso	4,568,998	117,725	Burkina Faso closed all preschool, primary, post-primary and secondary, professional and university institutions from 16 to 31 March.	
Canada	25,017,635	1,625,578	On 16 March, all schools were closed at the provincial and territorial level with the exception of British Columbia and Yukon. However, Yukon schools began their spring break 16 March and on 18 March 2020 the closure was extended until 15 April 2020. On 17 March, K-12 schools in British Columbia were suspended indefinitely. All educational institutions were closed by late March. Following the summer break, all schools reopened for the next school year.	
Cambodia	3,310,778	211,484		
Cayman Islands	9,182	—^{a}		
Chile	3,652,100	1,238,992	Chilean President Sebastian Pinera announced that schools across the country would only close if confirmed cases of coronavirus occur among students.	
Colombia	9,124,862	2,408,041		
Costa Rica	1,100,782	216,700		
Ivory Coast	6,120,918	217,914	Closure of all preschool, elementary, secondary and higher education establishments for a period of 30 days from 16 March 2020 at midnight	
Croatia	621,991	165,197	All schools closed in March 2020, 1-4 Grade reopened in May 2020, all other schools reopened on 7 September 2020 after the summer break.	
Cyprus	135,354	45,263		
Czech Republic	1,715,890	352,873	Both schools and universities are closed.	
Democratic People's Republic of Korea	4,229,170	526,400		
Denmark	1,185,564	312,379	Both schools and universities are closed.	
Ecuador	4,462,460	320,765		
Egypt	23,157,420	2,914,473	Grades from 1st primary to 3rd preparatory will do researches from home. 1st and 2nd secondary grades will take their exam from home, while 3rd secondary students will take their exam as usual in schools	
El Salvador	1,414,326	190,519	Salvadoran President Nayib Bukele ordered all schools to close for three weeks, following similar measures in Peru and Panama.	
Equatorial Guinea	160,019	—^{a}		
Estonia	224,987	47,794	Schools are closed.	
Ethiopia	23,929,322	757,175	Ethiopia has closed all schools and issued a ban on all public gatherings.	
Fiji	421,329	32,565	All schools and universities will be physically closed at least until June 2020. On 19 April 2020, one month after the first case was confirmed, the Ministry of Education confirmed that all primary and secondary schools will begin a transition to online learning across all grades, with online classes to start from 4 May 2020. All universities have already transitioned to online learning and began classes from 2 April 2020.	
France	12,929,509	2,532,831	Most of primary schools reopened on 11 May. Universities are still closed.	
Gabon	468,362	10,076		
Georgia	732,451	151,226		
Germany	12,291,001	3,091,694		
Ghana	9,253,063	443,693	Schools were reopened in January 2021.	
China^{b}	233,169,621	42,266,464	As the country of origin of the virus, China was the first country to mandate school closures. Following the Spring Festival holiday, China asked its nearly 200 million students to stay home and continue their educations online. According to UNESCO, China started reopening schools on March. See also: COVID-19 pandemic in Hong Kong; COVID-19 pandemic in Macau	
Greece	1,469,505	735,027	Both schools and universities were closed for two months. They reopened again on May. The new school year began on 14 September, with mandatory wearing of face masks for students from nursery school up to high school. However, on 6 November middle and high schools closed again due to a second national lockdown, with primary schools and kindergartens closing as well one week later.	
Grenada	26,028	9,260		
Guatemala	4,192,944	366,674		
Honduras^{c}	2,018,314	266,908	Honduras announced it would close schools for two weeks.	
Hungary	1,504,740	287,018	Both schools and universities are closed.	
Iceland^{g}	80,257	17,967	Schools are closed.	
India	286,376,216	34,337,594	On 16 March, India declared a countrywide lock-down of schools and colleges. On 19 March, the University Grants Commission asked universities to postpone exams until 31 March. The board exams conducted by CBSE and ICSE boards were postponed until 31 March at first and then later until July. Online learning was encouraged, despite the fact that pre-COVID, only a quarter of households (24 per cent) in India had access to the internet and there is a large rural-urban and gender divide. By April 2021 almost all States had opened schools.	
Indonesia	60,228,569	8,037,218	Schools and universities are closed. Students study from home with online educational applications, such as Google Classroom. Minister of Education and Culture of Indonesia, Nadiem Makarim launched an educational TV block on TVRI and has prepared for the scenario to study online until the end of the year.	
Iran	14,561,998	4,073,827	On 23 February, Iran's Ministry of Health announced the closure of universities, higher educational institutions and schools in several cities and provinces. Iran's education ministry developed an online system to continue teaching at schools named Shaad.	
Iraq	7,010,788	424,908	The country's first school closures took place in February 2020. In November 2020, schools opened their doors to children and began operating 6 days a week instead of 5, in an effort to maintain social distancing.	
Ireland^{b}	1,064,091	255,031	Schools, colleges and childcare facilities closed nationwide from 12 March 2020 until August/September 2020.	
Israel	2,271,426	210,041	On 13 September 2020, the government announced a three-week long lockdown which included full closure of schools, malls, and hotels.	
Italy	9,039,741	1,837,051	Both schools and universities are closed.	
Jamaica	552,619	74,537		
Japan^{d}	16,496,928	—	On 27 February 2020, Prime Minister Shinzo Abe requested that all Japanese elementary, junior high, and high schools close until early April to help contain the virus. This decision came days after the education board of Hokkaido called for the temporary closure of its 1,600 public and private schools. Nursery schools were excluded from the nationwide closure request. As of 5 March, 98.8 per cent of all municipally run elementary schools have complied with Abe's request, resulting in 18,923 school closures.	
Jordan	2,051,840	320,896	On 14 March 2020, the Jordanian government imposed measures fight the outbreak, including a tighter lockdown that closes all borders and bans all incoming and outgoing flights, closing schools and universities for two weeks and banning daily prayers in mosques. The minister of Education announced launching TV channels to broadcast lessons to high school students. Private schools and universities announced their schedules of online listens using different channels.	
Kazakhstan	4,375,239	685,045		
Kenya	13,751,830	562,521	NAIROBI, Kenya 26 Apr – Kenyan schools will remain closed for the next one month, following a directive by the government in measures aimed at preventing the spread of coronavirus. On 30 May, Education CS says schools should remain closed after receiving a National Response Committee report. He added the government will provide proper guidelines when the time is right to open schools. The report however recommends school's should be opened in September and students in Standard 8 and Form 4 should do their national examinations in February 2021.	
Kuwait	632,988	116,336		
Kyrgyzstan	1,443,925	217,693		
Latvia	313,868	82,914	Schools closed until 14 April.	
Lebanon	1,132,178	231,215	Nurseries are closed. Schools, colleges and universities implement distance learning.	
Lesotho	313,868	82,914	Lesotho declared a national emergency on 18 March and closed schools until 17 April (but allowed school meals to continue).	
Libya	1,510,198	375,028		
Lithuania	460,257	125,863	Nurseries are closed. Schools, colleges and universities implement distance learning.	
Luxembourg	102,839	7,058	Schools are closed.	
Malaysia	6,677,157	1,284,876	Schools and universities are closed from 18 March and reopen back on 15 July only for Form 1-4 Student and Primary 5–6.	
Mauritania	928,218	19,371		
Mexico	33,159,363	4,430,248	Several universities, including the UNAM and Tec de Monterrey, switched to virtual classes on 13 March 2020. The following day, the Secretariat of Public Education (SEP) announced that all sporting and civic events in schools would be cancelled. Also on 14 March, the Secretariat of Education announced that Easter break, originally planned from 6 to 17 April, would be extended from 20 March to 20 April as a preventive measure. The following day, 14 March, the Secretariat of Public Education (SEP) announced that all sporting and civic events in schools would be cancelled. Also on 14 March, the Secretariat of Education announced that Easter break, originally planned from 6 to 17 April, would be extended from 20 March to 20 April as a preventive measure. On the same day the Autonomous University of Nuevo León, (UANL) (the country's third largest university in terms of student population) suspended classes for its more than 206,000 students starting on 17 March and ending until further notice.	
Mongolia	870,962	155,248		
Montenegro	111,863	23,826	Montenegro barred public gatherings, closed schools for at least two weeks.	
Morocco	7,886,899	1,056,257		
Namibia	689,520	56,046	All schools were closed on 14 March 2020. Although this does not automatically apply to universities, they also suspended face-to-face teaching. Reopening of schools is only planned for "stage 3" of the plan to return to normalcy which is to come into effect on 2 June.	
Netherlands	3,336,544	875,455	On 12 March, all Dutch universities suspended physical teaching until 1 April, but online teaching will continue. The second school closure started on 16 December 2020. One day after the lockdown started.	
New Zealand^{g}			All schools and universities were closed down across the country on 26 March. The government imposed a two-week holiday, allowing schools to transition to forms of distant teaching as soon as possible. Universities closed for one week, but resumed with online teaching afterwards. Other school services remained open, but teaching was restricted to distant learning. All schools reopened on 11 May.	
North Macedonia	298,135	61,488	Both schools and nurseries are closed.	
Norway^{g}	1,073,521	284,042	Schools are closed.	
Oman	780,431	119,722	All educational institutions, public and private have been closed since 14 March. These include nurseries, schools, colleges and universities.	
Pakistan	44,925,306	1,878,101	All educational institutions are open.	
Palestine	1,404,021	222,336	Starting on 28 February 2021, schools in the occupied West Bank closed for 12 days in an attempt to stem the further spread of COVID-19 variants. High schools were exempt from this mandate.	
Panama	837,246	161,102	Panama's education minister Maruja Gorday announced the suspension of classes at public and private schools throughout most of the country starting on 11 March and extending at least through 7 April.	
Paraguay	1,519,678	225,211		
Peru	8,015,606	1,895,907		
Philippines	24,861,728	3,589,484	Both schools and universities are closed since 16 March 2020. Students study at home either online or module learning. The country has adopted a distance learning system – a mix of online classes, printed modules, and TV/radio lessons – following President Rodrigo Duterte's directive to suspend in-person classes until a COVID-19 vaccine became widely available. In-person classes reopened on 5 November 2021, in low-risk areas for colleges and universities, with a 50% class size limit. A trial for in-person classes for elementary and high schools began on 15 November 2021 for 100 public schools. Schools and universities had been fully reopened in all in-person classes since 2 November 2022.	
Poland	6,003,285	1,550,203	Both schools and universities are closed.	
Portugal	2,028,254	346,963	Both schools and universities are closed.	
Qatar	309,856	33,668		
Republic of Korea^{e}	7,044,963	3,136,395		
Moldova	498,881	87,277	Both schools and universities are closed.	
Romania^{f}	2,951,879	—	Schools were closed due to the pandemic from 11 March to 13 September 2020; 9 November 2020 – 7 February 2021; 2 April-4 May 2021 (prolonged spring break). Distance learning during school closures was optional until late April 2020.	
Russia	—	—	On 14 March, the Russian Ministry of Education advised schools across the country to adopt remote learning "as appropriate." The Moscow region introduced flexible attendance policies at area public schools and kindergartens, however all regular classes at schools would continue normally and children who elected to stay home at their parents discretion would learn online. The following day private schools in Moscow were urged to suspend operations for two weeks while several schools located within foreign embassies in Moscow were advised to enter a two-week quarantine. Moscow's chief sanitary doctor signed a decree banning visitors to boarding schools and orphanages. On 16 March, Moscow extended measures to closing public schools, universities, athletic schools and supplemental education institutions from 21 March to 12 April. Quarantine in all Russian schools since 23 March.	
Rwanda	3,388,696	75,713		
Saint Lucia	30,925	2,237		
Saudi Arabia	6,789,773	1,620,491		
Senegal	3,475,647	184,879	Schools closed from 14 March for 3–4 weeks.	
Serbia	964,796	256,172	Both schools and universities are closed.	
Singapore	—	—	Schools are conducting full home-based learning. Schools remain open only for parents who cannot find alternative accommodation for their children.	
Slovakia	832,055	156,048	Schools are closed.	
Slovenia	332,677	79,547		
South Africa	13,496,529	1,116,017	President Cyril Ramaphosa declared a national disaster in response to the COVID-19 outbreak and closed all schools until the end of South Africa's Easter holiday. On 16 March, the Minister of Higher Education, Science and Innovation is announced official measures impacting university and colleges across the country in response to a student at Wits University in Johannesburg who tested positive for coronavirus.	
Spain	7,696,101	2,010,183	Schools are open.	
Sri Lanka	4,917,578	300,794	The government ordered to close schools from 12 March to 20 April which also marks the end of the first term. The private tuition classes and tutorials are also closed for two weeks until 26 March.	
Sudan	8,171,079	653,088		
Switzerland	1,289,219	300,618	Schools are closed.	
Syria	3,491,113	697,415	Schools and universities have closed and in some form e-learning has developed.	
Taiwan			Schools were closed in a two-week extension of holidays in spring 2020. In 2021, schools were closed from 19 May until the start of the new academic year on 1 September. This second period of nationwide closures was due to a spike in domestic COVID-19 cases.	
Thailand	12,990,728	2,410,713		
Trinidad and Tobago	260,439	16,751	Schools were closed in March. Online-only learning since 14 September. Education involving tuition or field work was postponed.	
Tunisia	2,479,163	272,261		
Turkey	17,702,938	7,198,987	Online-only learning since 23 March Education involving tuition or field work was postponed.	
Turkmenistan^{g}			Holidays were extended in all secondary schools until 6 April of Turkmenistan. An order signed by the Ministry of Education as a preventative measure aims to prevent the spread of respiratory diseases in connection with the WHO coronavirus pandemic. Educations involving tuition and/or field work are postponed.	
Ukraine	5,170,368	1,614,636	Schools are closed.	
United Arab Emirates	1,170,565	191,794	On 3 March, the government announced that all private and public schools and colleges will close for four weeks from Sunday 8 March and the students will study at home for second two weeks. Then on 30 March, they announced that the e-learning programme will continue until the end of the year.	
United Kingdom			It was announced on 18 March that all UK schools would close by the 20th (the end of that working week) for all but the most vulnerable children and pupils whose parents were working in fields considered particularly important to the anti coronavirus effort. See also: Impact of the COVID-19 pandemic on education in the United Kingdom	
Uzbekistan	7,174,483	299,634		
Venezuela	6,866,822	—^{a}	President Nicholas Maduro issued a "collective quarantine" in seven states in Venezuela and suspended school and university classes.	
Yemen	5,852,325	267,498		
Zambia	3,955,937	56,680	Schools have been closed until further notice.	
TOTAL	831,021,742	128,207,915		

Notes
a Data on enrolment in tertiary education programmes is not available.
b Schools have started opening, but the majority remain closed.
c While all schools are open, universities have the choice to remain open or not.
d Universities were on school spring break, and hence closures not related to the coronavirus.
e Universities have postponed the beginning of the academic year by two weeks to 16 March.
f Most universities remain open.
g^{g} All educational institutions have opened.

=== Localised closures ===
As of 12 January 2021, 40 countries have localised school closures. UNESCO estimates 473,933,356 learners are potentially at risk (pre-primary to upper-secondary education) and 77,938,904 learners are potentially at risk in tertiary education.

Localised school closures, grouped by country/territory
Country	Region/s^{a}	See also	Ref
Australia	Australia did not unilaterally close schools or universities in line with advice from the Australian Health Protection Principal Committee. Some private and independent schools have chosen to close. On 22–23 March, the state governments of Victoria and the Australian Capital Territory contradicted federal government advice by enacting school closures, while the New South Wales state government encouraged students to stay home from school if possible. Many universities closed temporarily and transitioned to online learning.	COVID-19 pandemic in Australia	
Brazil	As of 16 March, Brazil has more confirmed cases of coronavirus than any other Latin American country, however President Jair Bolsonaro has issued few country-wide measures to slow the spread of the virus. Because the president and federal government failed to act regarding the pandemic and had, as of 18 March, not decided to cancel classes in the whole country, lower instances of government acted autonomously. State schools, municipal schools, private institutions and universities acted differently regarding suspending classes at once, gradually or not at all, and between replacing classes with distance education or simply postponing them. Because of that, there are only "localised" (as opposed to "national") school closures, as of 20 March, according to UNESCO. States such as São Paulo, Rio de Janeiro and Pernambuco have cancelled classes in state schools, but some municipal schools continue having classes normally even in those states. Minas Gerais state initially cancelled classes for public schools between for only three days and on 18 March, the state governor announced that classes in the region of the state capital Belo Horizonte were cancelled indefinitely, because there was confirmed community transmission in the region, but the rest of the state would continue having classes normally until further notice. In São Paulo, classes are being cancelled gradually, so that parents had time to come up with solutions that didn't involve letting the kids be with their grandparents. Between 16 and 20 March, students could go to class, but absentees would not be penalised. Classes were indefinitely cancelled starting on 23 March. Regarding the food safety of students, some municipal and state schools announced "food kits" for weekly pickup such as in Recife or that some selected schools would remain open for students to have lunch, such as in Espírito Santo. In higher education, Unicamp was the first university of the country to cancel all classes, stating on 13 March. Initially, classes were cancelled until 31 March, but later the university extended the suspension until 12 April. On 11 March, one student of USP was confirmed with the disease, leading one department to cancel classes for a single day, and it wasn't until 17 March that the whole university cancelled classes. Many universities across the country cancelled classes, such as UFV (since 16 March) and UNILA (since 17 March), but others remain open. In the city of São Paulo, which is home to half of Brazil's 120,000 Jews, Jewish schools have closed and some are providing class remotely over video. In Rio de Janeiro, Jewish day schools also closed in the absence of a state-wide decision regarding the closure of Rio's public and private schools.	COVID-19 pandemic in Brazil	
Finland^{b}	Pre-primary education and grades 1–3 will continue for the children of parents working in sectors critical to the functioning of society, as well as for children with special needs from pre-primary to upper secondary education. Early Childhood Education and Care will be provided for all children, whose parents are unable to arrange their care at home. In other levels of education, contact teaching can continue, if considered necessary for the completion of studies.	COVID-19 pandemic in Finland	
Sweden^{b}	Schools have mainly remained open during the pandemic. However, on March 17, 2020, the Swedish government declared that high schools, vocational schools and Universities should close, and instead recommended continuing lectures by distance education. Already after the summer breaks, however, Swedish high schools reopened, as the negative impact of school closures were assessed as outweighing the potential benefits. Universities and other adult educational forms were referred to the general recommendations that applied for the society.	COVID-19 pandemic in Sweden	
United States	As of 10 April 2020, most American public and private elementary and secondary schools—at least 124,000—had stopped in-person instruction nationwide, affecting at least 55.1 million students. By 2 May, school buildings had been ordered or recommended to be closed for the remainder of the academic year in 47 states, four territories, and the District of Columbia. Most schools shifted to online learning; however, there are concerns about student access to necessary technology, absenteeism, and accommodations for special needs students. School systems also looked to adjust grading scales and graduation requirements to mitigate the disruption caused by the unprecedented closures. A large number of higher educational institutions cancelled classes and closed dormitories in response to the outbreak, including all members of the Ivy League, and many other public and private universities across the country. Many universities also expanded the use of pass/fail grading for the Spring 2020 semester. On 27 March, President Donald Trump signed the CARES Act, which includes economic relief for student loan borrowers. The Act placed all federally held student loans into forbearance with no interest to be added through 30 September 2020.	Social impact of the COVID-19 pandemic in the United States Impact of the COVID-19 pandemic on education in the United States	
Uruguay	As of 14 March, Uruguay will only close schools in case of registered cases of coronavirus among students. The University of the Republic cancelled classes on 13 March 2020, and the government announced a two-week suspension of classes at public and private schools on Saturday, 14 March. Schools were to remain open to provide meals to students, but without classes.	COVID-19 pandemic in Uruguay	
Vietnam^{b}	All pre-primary, primary and lower secondary schools in Vietnam; and all upper-secondary institutions in multiple cities and provinces were closed.	COVID-19 pandemic in Vietnam	

Notes
a Figures correspond to total number of learners enrolled at pre-primary, primary, lower-secondary, and upper-secondary levels of education (ISCED levels 0 to 3), as well as at tertiary education levels (ISCED levels 5 to 8) who could be affected should localised closures become countrywide. Enrolment figures based on latest UNESCO Institute of Statistics data.
b All educational institutions are open.

== See also ==
- COVID-19 at the University of Notre Dame
- Digital divide
- Homeschooling during the 2020 COVID-19 pandemic
- Impact of the COVID-19 pandemic on the arts and cultural heritage
- Impact of the COVID-19 pandemic on cinema
- Impact of the COVID-19 pandemic on science and technology
- Impact of the COVID-19 pandemic on sports
- Impact of the COVID-19 pandemic on religion
- Distance education in Chicago Public Schools in 1937
