= Bartholet =

Batholet may refer to:

- Elizabeth Bartholet
- James Bartholet
- Bartholet, a Swiss manufacturer of chairlifts and gondolas
