= Heidi Schelhowe =

German university professor in digital Media education

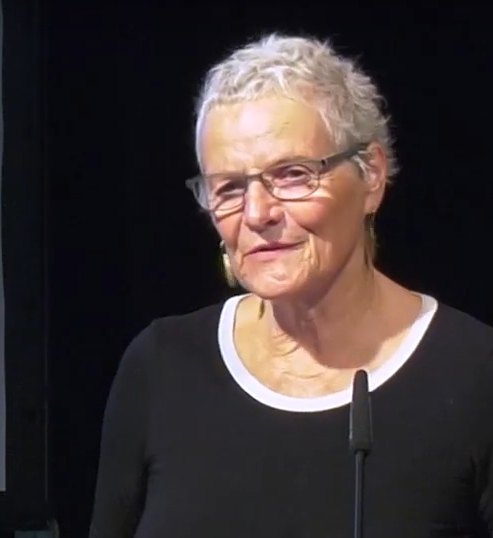
- Born: Heidelinde Heyl; 25 March 1949; Mösbach
- Died: 11 August 2021 (aged 72); Bremen
- Education: Albert Ludwigs University; Westphalian Wilhelms University; University of Bremen
- Occupation(s): University professor: Computer science, mathematics, media education

Heidelinde "Heidi" Schelhowe (born Heidelinde Heyl 25 March 1949 – 11 August 2021) was a German university professor. She headed the Digital Media in Education department (German: Digitale Medien in der Bildung, DIMEB) in Computer Science and Mathematics at the University of Bremen. From 2011 to 2014, she was the vice-rector for Teaching and Studies there. From 2011 to 2020, she was a member of the ZDF Television Council in the area of science.

== Life ==
Heidi Schelhowe studied German studies and Catholic theology at the Albert Ludwigs University in Freiburg and at the Westphalian Wilhelms University in Münster. She completed her training with an internship and a teaching examination for grammar schools in Bremen. She worked as a teacher in Bremen from 1975 to 1981. During that time, she became politically involved in the Communist League of West Germany (also known for its pro-choice position), which led to her dismissal from the civil service. In 1981, she was banned from working because of the Radicals Decree (Radikalenerlass). The City of Bremen in Bremen changed its position on the Radical Decree in 2012. Also the political Opinion on abortion changed in Germany. From 1982 to 1989, she studied computer science at the University of Bremen. As a research assistant, she began to work on the medial side of the computer and interaction and received her doctorate in 1996 with the topic "The Medium from the Machine. A Contribution to the Concept of the Computer in Computer Science". She then worked as a research assistant at the University of Hamburg and then held the same position at Humboldt University in Berlin. In 2001, she was appointed as a university lecturer for Digital Media in Education in the Computer Science and Mathematics department at the University of Bremen.

from 2011 to 2020, she was a member of the ZDF Television Council. There, she specialized in the area of Science and Research, a position which is appointed by the Free Hanseatic City of Bremen. At the German Informatics Society (GI), she established the Women and Informatics (FRAUINFORM) program as well as the Graspable Interaction (BGI) group. At the International Women University (IFU), she became the head of the Virtual IFU (VIFU) project in 2000. She sat on the board of directors at the Institute for Media Education in Research and Practice (JFF).

== Publications (selection) ==
- Frauenwelt, Computerräume. GI-Fachtagung Bremen, September 1989. Proceedings
- Das Medium aus der Maschine: Zur Metamorphose des Computers. Dissertation. Campus Verlag, Frankfurt/New York 1997.
- Ein Projekt der Hochschulreform. Die Internationale Frauenuniversität (ifu) doi:10.5840/philosophin2000112112
- G. Kreutzner, H. Schelhowe, B. Schelkle (2002) Nutzerinnenorientierung, Partizipation und Interaktion als Leitprinzipien: Die virtuelle Internationale Frauenuniversität (vifu). In: A. Neusel, M. Poppenhusen (eds) Universität Neu Denken. Schriftenreihe der Internationalen Frauenuniversität »Technik und Kultur«, vol 8. VS Verlag für Sozialwissenschaften, Wiesbaden, doi:10.1007/978-3-322-95045-1_19
- Technologie, Imagination und Lernen: Grundlagen für Bildungsprozesse mit Digitalen Medien, Waxmann, 2007.
- Be-greifbare Interaktionen: Der allgegenwärtige Computer: Touchscreens, Wearables, Tangibles und Ubiquitous Computing (Kultur- und Medientheorie) von Bernard Robben und Heidi Schelhowe | 1. März 2012
- Digital Realities, Physical Action and Deep Learning. FabLabs as Educational Environments? In: Corinne Büching, Julia Walter-Herrmann: FabLabs. Shape your World. transcript 2013
- ‘Through the Interface‘ – Medienbildung in der digitalisierten Kultur. In: MedienPädagogik, Heft 25 (27. Oktober) 40-58. Zürich 2016. http://www.medienpaed.com/article/view/427/426
- Vom Digitalen Medium und vom Eigen-Sinn der Dinge. In: merz, Zeitschrift für Medienpädagogik 04/2018, München
- Bockermann, Iris; Borchers, Jan; Brocker, Anke; Lahaye, Marcel; Moebus, Antje; Neudecker, Stefan; Stickel, Oliver; Stilz, Melanie; Wilkens, Daniel; Bohne, René Pipek, Volkmar; Schelhowe, Heidi: Handbuch Fab Labs: Einrichtung, Finanzierung, Betrieb, Forschung & Lehre. Bombini Verlag, Bonn 2021, ISBN 978-3-946496-26-7, S. 256 (bombini-verlag.de).

== Honors ==
At the 18th Interaction Design and Children Conference (IDC 2018), held from 19 to 22 June in Trondheim, Schelhowe was honored with the Edith Ackermann Award for Outstanding Achievement in the Eminent Scholar category.

She founded TechKreativ and FabLab Bremen at the university Bremen and was honorary president of FabLab e. V. Bremen.

In 2021, Heidi Schelhowe was posthumously named a Gesellschaft für Informatik fellow.

== Bibliography ==
- Gärtner, Helen (2019). "Nach zwanzig, dreißig Jahren hängt das immer noch im einzelnen Menschen" – Der Radikalenbeschluss von 1972 in der Erinnerung betroffener Lehrer*innen" [After twenty, thirty years it's still hanging in the individual human being" – The Radical Decree from 1972 in the memory of affected teachers] (PDF). Bonjour Geschichte. Archived from the original (PDF) on May 18, 2023.
