= Elizabeth Bartholet =

American academic

- Education: Radcliffe College; Harvard Law School
- Employer: Harvard Law School
- Known for: Civil rights and family law, specializing in child welfare, adoption and reproductive technology, homeschooling opposition
- Title: Morris Wasserstein Public Interest Professor of Law, Harvard Law School; Founding Faculty Director Harvard Law School's Child Advocacy Program

Elizabeth Bartholet is the Morris Wasserstein Public Interest Professor of Law at Harvard Law School, and Faculty Director of Harvard Law School's Child Advocacy Program (CAP). She teaches civil rights and family law, specializing in child welfare, adoption and reproductive technology.

Before joining the Harvard Faculty, she was engaged in civil rights and public interest work, first with the NAACP Legal Defense Fund, and later as founder and director of the Legal Action Center, a non-profit organization in New York City focused on criminal justice and substance abuse issues.

Bartholet is a supporter of the #MeToo movement, but has criticized some of what she considers its excesses.

Bartholet is an outspoken opponent of the homeschooling movement and has urged governments to implement policies to make it protect homeschooled children from abuse. Bartholet helped to organize the Summit to Regulate Homeschooling to be held at the Harvard Law School on June 18–19, 2020. Her co-organizer, William and Mary law professor James Dwyer, is the author of a 1994 law review article entitled "Parents' Religion and Children's Welfare: Debunking the Doctrine of Parents' Rights" (82 Calif. L. Rev. 1371), claiming that the fundamental civic relationship is not that between parents and children but between the individual and the state.

During the COVID-19 outbreak in 2020, when school closures forced necessary homeschooling, her previously published perspective on homeschooling was published in Harvard Magazine's May–June 2020 issue in an article by Erin O'Donnell. Bartholet's anti-homeschooling views received media attention and drew criticism from homeschool proponents.

Bartholet's publications include Nobody's Children: Abuse and Neglect, Foster Drift, and the Adoption Alternative (Beacon Press, 1999) and Family Bonds: Adoption, Infertility, and the New World of Child Production (Beacon Press, 1999), as well as numerous law review articles.

Bartholet earned a A.B. degree from Radcliffe College in 1962, and was granted their Alumnae Recognition Award in 1997. She earned a LL.B. degree from Harvard Law School in 1965, graduating magna cum laude.
