= Homeschooling during the COVID-19 pandemic =

There was a resurgence of homeschooling during the COVID-19 pandemic to help students return to school. Innovative parents sought to create solutions to their individual dilemmas by organizing local groups. These variations of homeschooling include micro schools and educational family co-ops. The first usually involves hired professionals to teach a small group of kids (similar to one-room schoolhouses). The second is a parent-organized co-operative where families take turns educating and minding their kids during the week. Both are largely available only to the well-off, as costs in time and money are high. 'Pandemic pod' is the fashionable term used to describe one of these arrangements where all group members agree to participate under well-defined and strictly enforced health rules.

Considering the overall racial and ethnic makeup of the U.S. population, and the relative size of each group, minority parents are much more likely to participate in learning pods: Parents identifying as Hispanic have the highest level of participation (22%), followed by parents identifying as Black (17%) and Asian (11%). Among white parents the participation rate was 17%. In addition, minority parents display significantly more interest in forming or joining learning pods (Hispanic, 29%; Black, 21%; Asian, 34%) compared to white parents (18%). Furthermore, parents identifying as special needs parents are considerably more likely to have their children in a learning pod (31%) compared to non-special needs parents (14%). Finally, parents with younger children (Kindergarten to 4th grade, 21%; 5th to 8th grade, 24%) tend to participate more in learning pods compared to parents with older children (9th to 12th grade, 14%), and parents of younger children also display greater interest in forming or joining learning pods (Kindergarten to 4th grade, 27%; 9th to 12th grade, 16%).

The impact of the COVID-19 pandemic on education forced school closures around the world. Parents are left to manage their children and it is causing economic, educational, political and psychological distress. A University of California, San Francisco study states that schools can't open safely until COVID-19 transmission in a general population is under control.

As schools have been closed to cope with the global pandemic, students, parents and educators around the globe have felt the unexpected ripple effect of the COVID-19 pandemic. While governments, frontline workers and health officials are doing their best slowing down the outbreak, education systems are trying to continue imparting quality education for all during these difficult times. Most public schools have turned to online, distance learning in an attempt to re-engage students back into school. Many students at home/living space have undergone psychological and emotional distress and have been unable to engage productively. Lack of social interaction and face to face engagement between students and their teachers, or peers, has decreased student's overall motivation. The requirements placed on parents to fill in the gaps as teachers aids and support the implementation of the curriculum through remote learning left parents questioning the reliability of online education. The best practices for online homeschooling are yet to be explored, and it is unclear if homeschooling, or any other mitigation effort, can prevent students from falling behind.

To mitigate the disruption of school closures, multiple educational structures have been proposed. These terms are used interchangeably and this makes it confusing for parents who are trying to figure out how to organize their lives this fall as most schools will only offer virtual instruction. But basically there are three distinct ideas: pandemic pods, micro schools, and family co-ops.

== Pandemic pod ==
A pandemic pods is a small group of people who are all taking similar precautions against catching the virus. For educational purposes, pandemic pods (also known as learning pods) are a composed group of students who learn together, in person, outside of a traditional school. A family unit living together is a natural pandemic pod — everyone is taking responsibility for everyone else's health outcomes. Learning pods take many forms, but they primarily offer the benefit of a smaller circle of students, which provides comfort from the coronavirus. It also gives the feeling of a more formal schooling option, in which parents can return to work and students could be in a learning environment that's much closer to the traditional setting.

== Family co-op ==
A family co-op is not a pandemic-related entity. Most family co-ops form to ease the economic pressures of child care among several families. Several families get together and agree to share afterschool care of all the kids on certain days. This arrangement frees each set of parents from childcare several times per week. If five families are involved, then each family can take responsibility for all kids once per week. Instead of money, this social arrangement trades in time. Parent cooperative education is a very old arrangement that has been extensively studied in academic literature.

== Canadian family bubble ==
In early April 2020, Canadian authorities actively encouraged the formation of family bubble — two families (usually with kids) who would join together and share responsibility for each other.

== Micro school ==
A micro school is some variation on the one-room school where parents hire a teacher to educate their children. Micro schools can be as small as just one family hiring a teacher or a group of parents makes arrangements for all of their children together, splitting the costs of such endeavor. The biggest advantage of micro schools is that parents have total control over their children's education, including the choice of teachers. Micro Schools can vary significantly in costs.

Some parents created "school pods" of multiple families or hired tutors to instruct students by zoom.

== Pandemic educational family co-op ==
A pandemic educational family co-op is the cross of all three structures: the micro schools, the family co-ops, and the Pandemic pods. Pandemic educational family co-ops function just like the educational family co-ops but in addition to all of the rest, the pandemic version stresses pandemic precautions within the group. This is the most economical solution for parents that are stuck without "brick and mortar" schools to send their kids during the week.
