= Digital media in education =

Overview of ICT in education

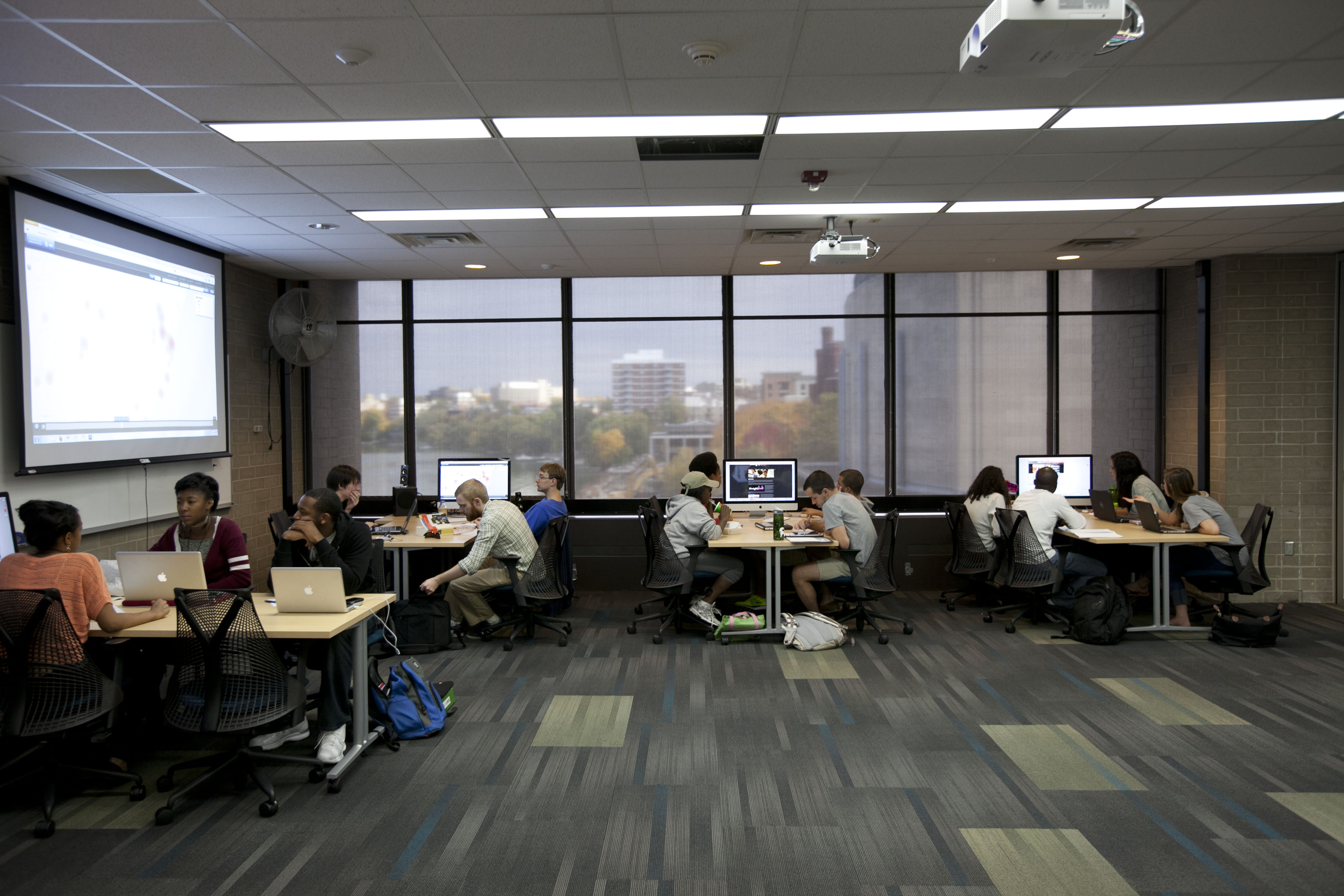
Students in a media lab class.

Digital media in education refers to the use of digital technologies to support and enhance teaching and learning processes. This includes the application of multiple digital software applications, devices, and online platforms as tools for learning. Learners interact with these technologies to access, analyze, evaluate, and create media content and communication in various forms. The integration of digital media in education has dramatically increased over time, significantly transforming traditional educational practices. When viewed through a global and inclusive lens, digital education should be guided by principles of equity, inclusion, and public infrastructure to ensure meaningful participation of all learners.

== History ==
=== 20th century ===
Technological advances in the 20th century, particularly the invention of the Internet, laid the foundation for incorporating technology into education. In the early 1900s, the overhead projector and instructional radio broadcasts were among the first technologies used for educational purposes. The introduction of computers in classrooms occurred in 1950, when a flight simulation program was developed to train pilots at the Massachusetts Institute of Technology. However, access to computers remained extremely limited for several decades.

In 1964, John Kemeny and Thomas Kurtz developed the BASIC programming language, which simplified computer interaction and introduced time-sharing, enabling multiple users to work on the same system simultaneously. This innovation made computing increasingly accessible for educational settings. By the 1980s, schools began to show more interest in computers as companies released mass-market devices to the public. Networking further enabled the interconnection of computers into unified communication systems, which proved more efficient and cost-effective than previous stand-alone machines. This development prompted wider adoption of computing in educational institutions.

The invention of the World Wide Web in 1992 further simplified internet navigation and sparked further interest in educational settings. Initially, computers were integrated into school curricula for tasks such as word processing, spreadsheet creation, and data organization. By the late 1990s, the Internet became a research tool, functioning as a vast library. By 1999, 99% of public school teachers in the United States reported having access to at least one computer in their schools, and 84% had a computer available in their classrooms.

The emergence of World Wide Web also contributed to the development of learning management systems (LMS), which allowed educators to create online teaching environments for content storage, student activities, discussions, and assignments. Advances in digital compression and high-speed Internet made video creation and distribution more affordable, fostering the use of the systems designed for recording lectures. These tools were often incorporated into learning management platforms, supporting the expansion of fully online courses.

=== 21st century ===
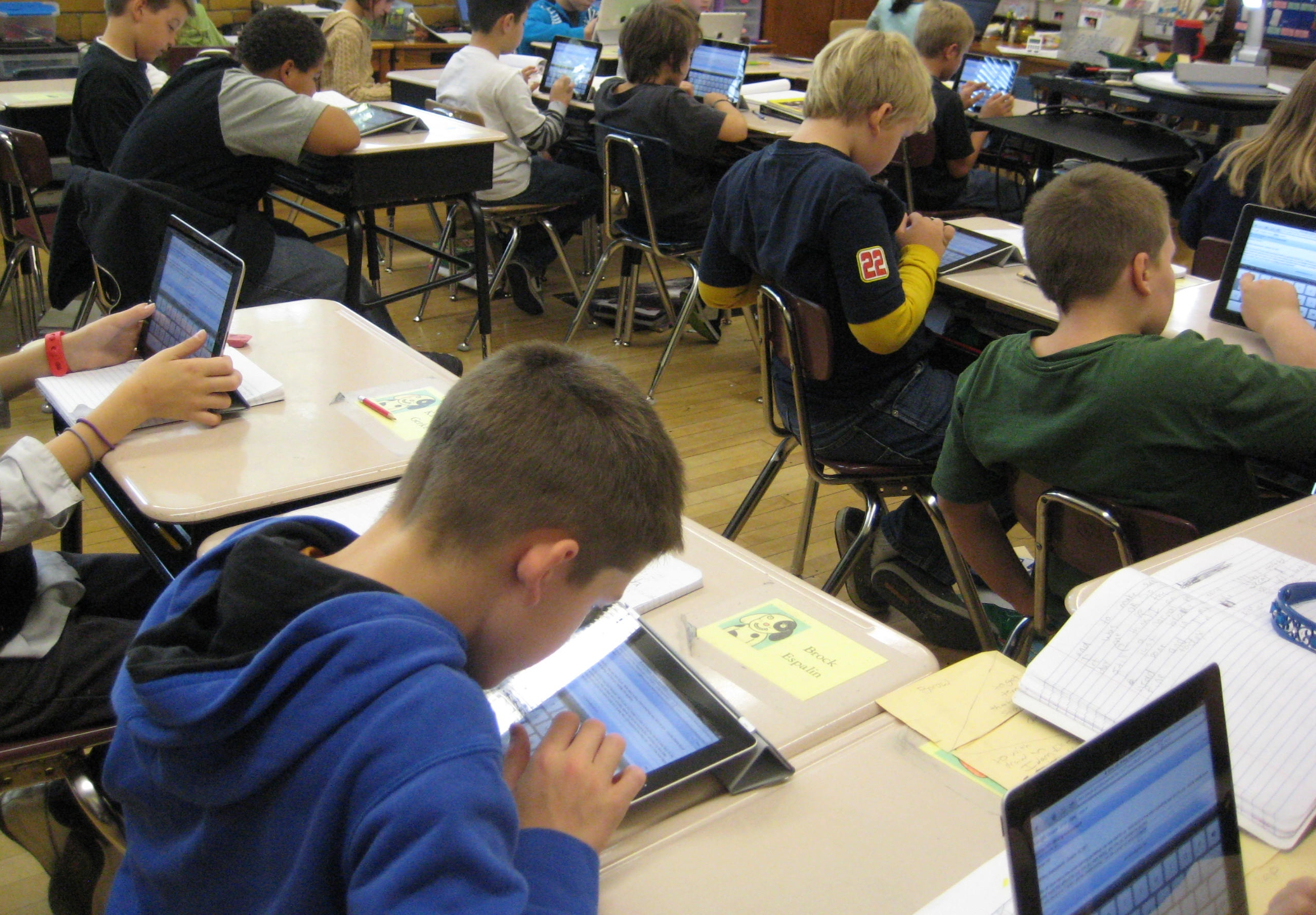
Students taking an assessment on iPads

By 2002, the Massachusetts Institute of Technology began offering recorded lectures to the public, marking a significant milestone in the movement toward accessible online education. The launch of YouTube in 2005 further transformed educational content distribution. Educators increasingly uploaded lectures and instructional videos on platforms with initiatives like Khan Academy, which was active in 2006, contributing to You Tube's role as a prominent educational resource.

In 2007, Apple launched iTunesU, another platform for sharing educational resources and videos. Meanwhile, learning management systems gained popularity, with Blackboard and Canvas becoming two of the most widely used platforms with Canvas's release in 2008. That same year also marked the introduction of the first Massive Open Online Course (MOOC), which provided open access to webinars and expert-led instructions for global learners.

As technology evolved, traditional projectors were gradually replaced by interactive whiteboards, which enabled educators to integrate digital tools more effectively in their classrooms. By 2009, 97% of classrooms in the United States had at least one computer, and 93% had Internet access.

The COVID-19 pandemic, which forced schools across the world to close, significantly impacted education with schools shifting to distance education. Students attended classes remotely using devices such as laptops, phones, and tablets, supported by digital platforms that facilitated at-home learning environments. However, adapting assessment methods to the new learning environment posed certain challenges. A study conducted by Eddie M. Mulenga and José M. Marbán on Zambian students during the pandemic revealed difficulties in adapting to digital learning, particularly in subjects like mathematics. Similar issues were reported among students in Romania, where the transition to virtual learning presented significant obstacles in engagement and adaptability.

=== Post-pandemic developments ===
In the period following the onset of COVID-19, education systems worldwide rapidly adopted digital solutions to maintain continuity of learning and teaching. By the end of March 2020, all 46 OECD and partners countries closed some or all of their schools nationwide. By June 2020, the length of school closures in these countries ranged from 7 to over 18 weeks. These disruptions in formal education prompted governments and educators to quickly adopt digital learning. This global shift to online education highlighted considerable inequalities in digital access, although many systems struggled with inequitable access, especially in regions lacking devices, stable internet connections, or conducive home learning environments. Stimultaneously, commercial educational technology (ed-tech) companies introduced rapid digital solutions to the disruption caused by the pandemic. This led to what has been described as a "seller's market," where the urgency of implementation may cause the prioritization of availability and scale over pedagogical and equity considerations.

In the post-pandemic era, digital media in education continues to evolve. It increasingly intersects with artificial intelligence (AI) technologies such as adaptive learning platforms, AI-enabled content generation, and personalized learning environments. These tools enhance global engagement and access but also raise concerns about infrastructure, inclusivity, ethical implementation as well as critical pedagogies. Scholars recommend that educators and policymakers adopt inclusive practices, prioritize equitable infrastructure, and develop critical digital literacy. Facer and Selwyn also emphasize the need for public digital infrastructure and sustainable and justice-oriented policies that empower all learners. Overall, these perspectives reflect a growing consensus that digital media in education should be implemented critically to promote inclusive, multimodal, and future-oriented learning environments.
