= National Political Association =

In the context of Mexican politics, a national political association (Spanish: Agrupación política nacional, APN) is a citizens' association intended to assist in the development of democratic life and the country's political culture, as well as being intended to create a better informed public opinion. They are similar to political parties; they used to receive public funding through the Federal Electoral Institute (IFE) for the promotion of their activities and ideas, but this was no longer the case after the 2008 political reform; after the 2014 political reform and the transformation of the IFE into INE, only political parties and independent candidates can receive public funding. APNs are not allowed to register candidates for election, though they can publicly support those of other political parties through association agreements and may only do so during federal elections. The creation of an APN is regarded (albeit not obligatory) as the first step towards the creation of a full-fledged political party.

In order to register an APN before IFE, the association has to provide documentation proving a minimum of 5000 members in at least seven Mexican states. They must also already have a charter or some other foundational document in which the association's ideology is delineated. The proposed name of the association cannot have the word "party" (partido) in it.

The first APNs were registered in 1978. The first four registered APNs were the Revolutionary Workers' Party, Unity of the Communist Left, Communitarian Action and Unity and Progress.

In a similar vein, the Electoral Institutes of individual states are entitled to create local political associations which are to be active only in the state of their registration.

== Notable national associations ==
- National Assembly of the Socialist Left (Asamblea Nacional de la Izquierda Socialista): an alliance of far-left groups in Mexico.
- National Synarchist Union: a former political party.
- Popular Socialist: another former political party.
- Socialist Workers' Movement: Trotskyist organization and Mexican section of the Trotskyist Fraction - Fourth International.
- Socialist Alliance (Alianza Socialista): created in 2004, it is an alliance of several Trotskyist factions that split off from the old Revolutionary Workers' Party.

- Socialist Convergence (Convergencia Socialista, CS): Founded in 1996 by the group formerly known as the Revolutionary Workers' Party. It is a sympathizing organization of the Fourth International. CS is working to establish itself as a national political party. In early 2004 it became a founding member of a proposed electoral alliance called the Socialist Alliance (see entry above).
- Socialist Unity League (Liga de Unidad Socialista, LUS) is a small Trotskyist group in Mexico. It was formed in 1996 and is close to two groups in the reunified Fourth International: the US group Socialist Action and the German Revolutionary Socialist League. It is also a member of the Socialist Alliance.

== See also ==
- Politics of Mexico
- List of political parties in Mexico
