= List of historical political parties in Germany =

The list of historical political parties in Germany lists the historical parties in Germany since 1848. For current political parties in Germany, see List of political parties in Germany.

== Political groups in the Frankfurt National Assembly ==
In the National Assembly in Frankfurt, the first freely elected parliament for all of Germany, that of 18 May 1848 to 31 Existed in May 1849, the following groups were represented:

- Fraction Augsburger Hof
- Fraction Casino
- Fraction German court
- Fraction Thunder Mountain
- Fraction Landsberg
- Group Milani (also: Café Milani)
- Fraction Nürnberger Hof
- Fraction Paris court
- Fraction West Hall
- Fraction Württemberger Hof

== Parties and political groups in 1848 to the founding of the Empire ==
- German General Workers' Association
- Old liberal (1849–1876)
- Federal Constitutional rule of association
- Democratic Party (1863–1866)

German Progressive Party German National Team German Reform Association

- Fraction Bockum-Dolffs (1862–1870) (Left center)
- Free Conservative Party, see: Reich and Free Conservative Party
- Catholic faction (1852–1867)
- Conservative Party, since 1876: German Conservative Party

Cross Party newspaper (1848–1867)

- Lassallescher General German Workers Association (1867–1872)
- Nassau Progressive Party (1863-1866, then merged into German Progress Party)
- National Liberal Party
- Imperial and free Conservative Party (1867–1918), see also: Free Conservative Party
- Saxon People's Party
- Social Democratic Labour Party
- Weekly party (1851–1858)

== German Empire ==
- Old liberal (Al)
- Antisemitic People's Party
- Bavarian Farmers Association (BB)
- Bavarian patriotic party, see also: Centre Party
- Christian Social Workers' Party (CSAP) (1878–1881), see also: Christian Social Party (CSP) (1878–1918) and German Conservative Party
- Christian Social Party (CSP) (1878–1918), also: Christian Social Workers' Party (CSAP) (1878–1881)
- Democratic Party (DP) (1885–1895)
- Democratic Union (DV) (1908–1918)
- Democratic Club (DVE) (1871–1873)
- German Conservative Party (DKP) (1876–1918), before: Conservative Party (LAD)
- German Progressive Party (DFP) (1861–1884)
- German Liberal Party (DFSP) (1884–1893)
- German Reform Party (DRP) (1900–1914), see also: antisemitic, German Social Reform Party
- German Fatherland Party (DVLP) (1917–1918)
- German People's Party (DTVP) (1868–1910), also: South German People's Party (1868–1910), see also: People's Democratic Party, Progressive People's Party
- German Social Party (DSP) (1900–1914), see: antisemitic
- German Social Reform Party (PRSP) (1894–1900), see also: antisemitic, German Reform Party, German Social Party
- Deutschvölkische Party (DVP) (1914–1918)
- Progressive People's Party (FoVp) (1910 to 1918), see also: Liberal Association, Liberal People's Party (FVP) (1893–1910)
- Free Conservative Party, see also Reich and Free Conservative Party (RFKP)
- Liberal Association (FVG) (1893 to 1910), see also: Progressive People's Party, National Social Association (NSA)
- Koła Polskie (1848–1918), see also: Polish Party, Centre Party
- Conservative Party (LAD) (1848–1918), see: German Conservative Party (DKP)
- Liberal Party Empire (LRP) (1871–1874)
- Liberal Association (secessionists) (1880–1884), see also: National Liberal Party (NLP)
- National Liberal Party (NLP) (1867–1918), see also: Liberal Association (secessionists)
- National Social Club (NSV) (1896 to 1903), see also: Liberal Association (FVG)
- Poland party, also: Kola Polskie
- Imperial and Free Conservative Party (RFKP) (1867–1918), see also: Free Conservative Party
- Social Democratic Party, see also: Socialist Workers Party of Germany
- Socialist Workers Party of Germany, see: Social Democratic Party of Germany
- Guelph, see also: German-Hanoverian Party (DHP)
- Centre Party

== Weimar Republic ==
- Old Social Democratic Party, see also: (SPD) Social Democratic Party of Germany
- Workers' and Peasants' Party of Germany (ABPD) (1931–33), see: Christian Socialist Reich Party (CSRP) (1920–33)
- Bavarian Farmers Association (BBB) (1895–33), also: Bavarian peasants and middle class Confederation (1922–33), see also: German Peasants' Party
- Bavarian peasants and middle class Federation (1922–33), including: Bavarian Farmers' Association (1895–22), see also: German Peasants' Party
- Bavarian People's Party (BVP) (1918–33), see also: Centre Party
- Christian-National Peasants' and Country People's Party (CNBLP / CNBL) (1928–33), including: German peasantry (DL) (1930–33)
- Christian Social Party (Bavarian Center) (1920–26), also: Christian Social Party Empire (CSRP) (1920–33)
- Christian Social Community (CSVG) (1922 to 1926), see also: Christian Social Party Empire (CSRP) (1920–33)
- Christian Social Party Empire (CSRP) (1920–33), see also: Workers and Peasants Party (ABPD)
- Christian Social People's Service (CSVD) (1929–33), see also: Christian Social Party (1878–18), German National People's Party
- Christian Democratic Party (center), see: Centre Party
- German-Hanoverian Party (DHP), see also: Guelph
- German Workers' Party (DAP) (1919/1920), see: National Socialist German Workers Party (NSDAP)
- German Peasant Party (1928–33), see also: Bavarian Farmers Association (BB)
- German Democratic Party (DDP) (1918 to 1930), see also: German State Party (DStP) (1930–33)
- German State Party (DStP) (1930–33), see also: German Democratic Party (1918–30)
- German People's Party (DVP) (1918–33)
- German free-free-money-collar (1919–21), see also: Free Business Association (FFF)
- German peasantry (DL) (1930–33), also: Christian-National Peasants' and Country People's Party (CNBLP / CNBL) (1928–33)
- German National People's Party (DNVP), see also: Combat Front Black-White-Red (KFSWR)
- German Social Party (DTSP) (1921–28), see: Richard Kunze, Nationalist parties
- Deutschvolkische Freedom Party (DVFP), see also: National Socialist German Workers Party (NSDAP), National Socialist Freedom Party, Deutschvolkische Freedom Movement, National Socialist Freedom Movement of Greater Germany
- Free Business Association (FFF / FWB) (1919–33), see also: German free-free-money-collar
- Battle Front Black-White-Red (1933), name of the German National People's Party 1933
- Communist Workers' Party of Germany (KAP) (born 1920), see also: Communist Party of Germany
- Communist Association (CISA) (1921–22), see also: (USPD) Communist Party of Germany (KPD), Independent Social Democratic Party of Germany
- German Communist Party (KPD), see also: Spartacus, Independent Social Democratic Party of Germany (USPD), Communist Party Opposition (KPO), Workers' Communist Party (KAP), Lenin League, Communist Association (CISA )
- Communist Party Opposition (KPO also KPD-O) (1929), see also: German Communist Party (KPD), Socialist Workers Party of Germany (SAPD)
- Conservative People's Party (CIP) (1930–31), also: Conservative People's Association (VCV) (1930–33), see also: German National People's Party (DNVP)
- Lenin League (born 1928), see also: German Communist Party (KPD), Left Communists
- Liberal Association (LVG) (1924–29), see: German Democratic Party (DDP), German People's Party (DVP)
- National Socialist German Workers Party (NSDAP), see also: German Workers' Party (DAP), Völkisch-Social Block (CDB), Deutschvolkische Freedom Party (DVFP)
- Radical Democratic Party (RDP) (1930–33)
- Nazi Party of the German middle class (Economic Party) (1920–33) (WP), see also: Economic Party (WP), 1920–25: Economy party of German SMEs
- Nazi Party for People's Rights and appreciation (People's Rights Party) (VRP) (1926–33), see also: People's right-wing party, the Christian Social Reich Party (CSRP)
- Republican Party (RPD) (1924)
- Social Democratic Party (SPD), see also: Old Social Democratic Party, Socialist Workers Party of Germany (SAPD), Independent Social Democratic Party of Germany (USPD)
- Socialist Workers Party of Germany (SAPD) (born 1931), see also Social Democratic Party of Germany (SPD), the Communist Party Opposition (KPO), Independent Social Democratic Party of Germany (USPD)
- Social Republican Party of Germany. Horsing movement for job creation (SRPD)
- Independent Social Democratic Party of Germany (USPD) (1917–31), see also, Social Democratic Party of Germany (SPD), the Communist Party of Germany (KPD), Communist Association (CISA) Socialist Workers Party of Germany (SAPD)
- Social Völkisch-block (CDB), see also: Nazi
- Conservative People's National Association (VCV) (1929), from 1930 Conservative Popular Party
- People's Rights Party (VRP), see: Nazi Party and appreciation for people right
- Economic Party (WP), see: Nazi Party of the German middle class (WP)
- Economic Party of the German Mittelstand, see: Nazi Party of the German middle class (WP)
- Center Party, see also: Bavarian People's Party (BVP), Social Christian Party, Christian Social Community (CSVG), Christian Social Reich Party (CSRP)

== Saarland 1945-1956 ==
The Saarland was after the Second World War until 1 January 1957 an autonomous territory in French protectorate. Accordingly, emerged after 1945 independent parties. Prior to the referendum via European Saar Statute 1955, political parties were allowed, that wanted to be reunited with the Federal Republic of Germany.

- Christian Democratic Party of Saarland (CVP), founded in 1945, merged in 1956 with the Center Party to Christian People's Party (CVP), again in 1957 alone and association with the CSU-Saar to CSU / CVP, 1959 merged into the CDU with the elimination of the Saarland People's Party (SVP)
- Social Democratic Party of Saarland (PLC), founded in 1945, dissolved in 1956 in favor of the SPD on
- Democratic Party Saar (DPS), founded in 1946 banned, 1951–55, and since 1957 as FDP / DPS Saarland State Association of FDP
- Communist Party Saar, actually Communist Party, National Union Saar (KP, also KPS), founded in 1945, in 1957 as a replacement organization banned the German Communist Party

German People's Party (DV), founded in 1952, merged in 1955 in the DPS

- CDU Saar, founded in 1952, approved in 1955, from 1957 National Association of the CDU
- SPD Saar approved in 1955, was founded in 1952 without authorization as German Social Democratic Party (DSP)
- German Democratic Union (DDU), founded in 1955, joined in 1961 to the German Peace Union
- CSU Saar, founded in 1955, brings together from 1957 to 1959 with the CVP, then burst into the CDU
- Nationwide European People's Party Saar (ÜEVPS), stepped up to the parliamentary elections in 1955

== German Democratic Republic ==
=== Parties of the National Front of the German Democratic Republic ===
SED - Socialist Unity Party of Germany (emerged in 1946 from the forced merger of the SPD and the KPD, 1989 renamed SED-PDS, 1990 renamed PDS, in 2005 renamed the Left Party, 2007 merged with WASG and renamed The Left)

Bloc parties

CDU - Christian Democratic Union of Germany (DDR), founded in 1945, merged in 1990 in the CDU
DBD - Democratic Peasants' Party of Germany, founded in 1948, merged in 1990 in the CDU East Germany
Liberal Democratic Party - founded in 1945 as LDP, March 1990 merger with NDPD to Alliance of Free Democrats, August risen 1990 in FDP
NDPD - National Democratic Party of Germany, founded in 1948, March 1990 merger with LDPD to Alliance of Free Democrats, August risen 1990 in FDP

=== Independent parties ===
- Initiative for Peace and Human Rights (January 1986 founded, merged 1990/91 Alliance 90)
- New Board (September 1989 founded, 1990/91 in part merged into Alliance 90, last begun 2006 on a country's general election)
- Democracy Now (September 1989 founded, merged 1990/91 Alliance 90)
- DA - Democratic Awakening (October / December 1989 founded, August 1990 went up in CDU GDR)
- SDP - Social Democratic Party in the GDR (founded in October 1989, September 1990 in SPD risen)
- F.D.P. - Free Democratic Party of East Germany (November 1989/Februar founded in 1990, August 1990 FDP risen)
- Green Party (November 1989/Februar founded in 1990, in 1990 in The Greens risen)
- Independent Women's Association (founded in December 1989, September 1991 conversion to club dissolved in 1998)
- DFP - German Forum Party (merged split in January 1990 by the New Forum, August 1990 FDP)
- DSU - German Social Union (founded in January 1990)
- VL - United Left (founded in January 1990, part of the United Left Coalition, disbanded after 1990)
- The cloves (founded in January 1990, part of the United Left Coalition, disbanded about 1995)
- Alliance 90 (February 1990 as a union list, September 1991 as a party, May 1993 went up in Alliance 90/The Greens)

In addition, he wrote some more Small Partys, which some still exist, including:

- Autonomous Action Wydoks (AA Wyd)
- Federation of Diabetics (BdD)
- Socialist Workers' Federation (BSA)
- Christian League (CHRISTIAN LEAGUE)
- Christian Democratic People's Party (CDPP)

German beer drinkers Union (DBU)

- German Youth Party (DJP)
- Unit now
- European Union, the German Democratic Republic (EUdDDR)
- European Federalist Party Europe Party (EFP)
- Senior Protection Association "GREY PANTHER" (SSB GP)
- Communist Party of Germany (KPD)
- Spartacist League Germany (SpAD)

Independent Social Democratic Party of Germany (USPD)

- Independent Party (SRP)
- Unification of the working groups for employees Politics and Democracy (AAD)

In addition, parties were in different electoral coalitions, including:

- Alternative Left List (ALL): VL, cloves and UFV for City Council election in Berlin, 1990
- Alternative Youth list (AJL): fdj and other Youth Party s to parliamentary elections 1990

== Federal Republic of Germany ==
=== Established 1945 - 1959 ===
BCSV - Baden Christian Social People's Party, founded in 1945, Baden in 1947 National Association of the CDU

BDV - Bremer Democratic Party, founded in 1945, 1947, following the DVP, 1947 following the FDP

BHE - Confederation of expellees and disenfranchised, founded in 1950, from 1952 all-German block / bunch of expellees and disenfranchised (GB / BHE), 1961 merger with the German Party (DP) the total German Party (GDP)
BHKP - Bavarian homeland and king's party, founded in 1945
BdD - Association of German, Party for Unity, Peace and Freedom, founded in 1953, 1968 de facto in German Peace Union (DFU) risen
CNG - Christian National Community, 1959/60 Saarland as a splinter of the CDU
CVP - Christian Democratic Party, founded in 1956 by the merger of Christian Democratic Party of Saarland and German Center Party, again in 1957 split into the two parties of origin
DPD - Democratic Party of Germany (1947/48), founded in 1947, working party set 1948
DAP - German construction party, founded in 1945, 1946 merger with German Conservative Party to DKP-DRP
DG - German Community, 1949 arose from German Union, 1965 dawned in Action Commonwealth of Independent German (AUD)
DKP - German Conservative Party, founded in 1945, 1946 merger with German construction party for DKP-DRP
DKP-DRP - German Conservative Party - German right-wing party emerged in 1946 from German construction party and German Conservative Party, National Democratic Party in 1950 to German Reich Party
DNS - Association of National Collection, electoral alliance of various right-wing parties, including German Community and The German block

The German block, founded in 1947 as a spin-off of dissolved WAV, after 1952

DP - German Party, founded in 1945 as Lower Saxony's Party (NLP), from 1946 DP, 1961 merger with GB / BHD to GDP in 1962 founded as a spin-off of the GDP, 1980 conversion to club, 1993 Start-up
DRP - German Reich Party, founded in 1950 by merger of dissolved DKP-DRP and the National Democratic Party, 1965
DSP - German Social Party - Independent Association of expellees and disenfranchised, founded in 1950
DSP - German Social Union, founded in 1956, disbanded in 1962
DP - Democratic Party, founded in 1946, as of 1948 Baden National Association of the FDP
DP - Democratic Party of Rhineland-Palatinate, created in 1947 from the Rhineland Liberal Party (LP) and Social People's League (SV), Rhineland-Palatinate from 1948 National Association of the FDP
DVP - Democratic Party, founded in 1945, 1952 union with the Baden FDP to FDP / DVP, National Association of Baden-Württemberg for the FDP
DEA - 1949 European People's Movement in Germany
FVP - Free People's Party, founded in 1956 as a splinter group of the FDP, 1957 merger with DP
DTS - Free German People's Party, created in 1957 from the Berlin National Association of FVP, 1968 resolved
FU - Federal Union, 1951-53, Parliamentary Group of Bavaria party, and later the center NE, 1957 electoral alliance of center, Bavaria and German-Hanoverian Party Party
FSP - Free Social Party, worked out in 1950 in FSU
FSU - merged Free Social Union, from about 1958 Free Social Union, starting in 1968 with the additional designation Democratic center, 2001 in Human Economy Party
GVP - All-German People's Party, founded in 1952, disbanded in 1957
Hamburg-block, as of 1953 the Hamburg European national associations of CDU, FDP and DP, 1957 resolved
CP - German Communist Party, founded in 1919, banned in 1933, 1945 constituted, in East Germany in 1946 to merge with SPD SED (now The Left), in western Germany banned 1956

LDP - Liberal Democratic Party, founded in 1945, initially as the German Democratic Party (DDP), in Bavaria in 1946, Hesse worked out in 1948 in the FDP

LP - Liberal Party of the Rhineland, 1947 merger with SV Democratic Party to Rhineland-Palatinate
SME - German SMEs (German Mittelstand Union parties, UDM), 1957
NDP - National Democratic Party, founded in 1945, 1950 merger with DKP-DRP to German right-wing party

NB - new citizens Covenant, founded in 1948, merged in 1950 in BHE

NU - Low German Union, founded in 1950 as a merger dissolved the Lower Saxony state associations of CDU, FDP and DP, leaving the FDP 1951, 1955
PFD - Free Democrats party, founded in 1945, 1946, dawned as Hamburg State Association in the FDP
RSF - Radical Social Freedom Party, founded in 1946, merged in 1950 in FSU
SFP - Social Freedom Party, founded in 1947, merged in 1950 in FSU
SRP - Socialist Reich Party of Germany, founded in 1949 as a splinter group of the DKP-DRP, 1952 banned
SV - Social People's Alliance, founded in 1946, 1947 merger with LP to Democratic Party of Rhineland-Palatinate
SVP - Saarland People's Party, founded in 1959 as a splinter group of the CSU / CVP, merged in 1965 in the CVP
SzT - founded collection to action, 1949

VBH - father Municipal Federation Hamburg, founded in 1946, 1949 electoral alliance of Hamburg European national associations of CDU, FDP and German Conservative Party, 1952 resolved

VU - Patriotic Union, founded in 1949, merged in 1966 in the NPD
WAV - Economic development Association, founded in 1945, disbanded in 1953
WDV - voter community of pilots injured, displaced and injured currency, after 1951 voter community of pilots injured evacuees and victims currency

=== 1974 - Established in 1960 ===
ADF - founded in 1969 Action of Democratic Progress in 1968, working party set
AUD - Commonwealth of Independent Action German, founded in 1965 disbanded in 1980 in favor of the Greens
BSP - Bavarian State Party, founded in 1967 after the removal of the Bavaria Party (BP), dissolved 1986
CVP - Christian Democratic Party, founded in 1965 as an association of Center Party and set Saarland People's Party, party work after 1970
DL - Democratic Left, founded in 1967, took up only to state elections in Baden-Württemberg 1968
DSP - German sex party, founded in 1970, disbanded after 1973
DU - German Union, founded in 1971 as a successor party to the NLA, disbanded after 1974

EFP - European Federalist Party, founded in 1964, party work stopped in 1994

FSP (ML) - Free Socialist Party (Marxist-Leninist), 1967-1968, the first Maoist party in Germany
GDP - resolved All-German Party, 1961 arose as a fusion of DP and GB / BHE, 1966 renamed All-German Party (GPD), 1981
GIM - International Marxist Group, German section of the Fourth International, founded in 1969, 1986 merger with German Communist Party / Marxist-Leninist and the United Socialist Party (VSP)
CP-AO - Communist Party of Germany (organizational structure), founded in 1970, disbanded in 1980
KPD / ML - German Communist Party / Marxist-Leninist, founded in 1968, 1986 merger with International Marxist Group for the United Socialist Party (VSP)
NLA - National Liberal action, founded in 1970, set in 1971 working party, successor to German Union
SEW - Socialist Unity Party of West Berlin since 1969, before SED West Berlin, renamed in 1990 in Socialist Initiative, dissolved in 1993

=== Established 1975 - 1989 ===
AL - Alternative list, founded in 1978, from 1980 National Association of Green, from 1993 Alliance 90/The Greens in Berlin
ASD - all insured persons and pensioners in Germany (Pensioners' Party), founded in 1982, disbanded in 1989
AVP - Fourth Community Action Party, founded in 1975, merged into Free Republican Party
APD - motorists and citizens interested Party of Germany, founded in 1988, disbanded in 2002

BGL - resolved Bremer Green List, founded in 1974, after 1983

Citizens Party - The Citizens' Party, founded in 1979, disbanded after 1986
BWK - 1995 Confederation West German communists Founded in 1980, dissolved
Colorful List - Defend yourselves, founded in 1978, the same year merger with GLU Landesverband Hamburg to GAL
C.B.V. - Christian Bavarian People's Party (Bayerische Patriot movement) risen, founded in 1975 as a splinter group of the Bavarian Party (BP), in 1988 in the BP
LIGA - Christian League - The Party refounded for Life, founded in 1985 as a Christian Party for Life (CPL), since 1987 as LIGA, disbanded in 1995 and as a Christian Party (CPD), merged in 2002 in the Centre Party
DS - Democratic Socialists, founded in 1982 as a breakaway from the SPD disbanded, 1991

The Citizens' Party, founded in 1979, disbanded after 1986 EAP - European Labour Party, founded in 1974, disbanded in 1986

FAP - Free German Workers Party, founded in 1979, 1995 banned (as a society)
FVP - Freedom People's Party, removal of the Republicans in 1985, after 1986 working party set
WOMEN - Women's Party, founded in 1979, merged in 1997 Feminist Party - THE WOMEN
PEACE LIST - founded peace list, electoral alliance set in 1984 with the participation of DFU, DKP and others, 1989 work
Grey - The Grey - Gray Panthers, founded in 1989, disbanded, 2008
GAZ - Green Action future, founded in 1978, went in 1980 in The Greens to, dissolved in 1982 and the Greens went to the ÖDP to
Green List Schleswig-Holstein, founded in 1978, in 1982 in The Greens risen
GLU - Green List environmental protection, founded in 1977, in 1980 in The Greens risen

KBW - Communist League of West Germany, founded in 1973, disbanded in 1985

KPD / RZ - Kreuzberg Patriotic Democrats / Realistic center, founded in 1988, inactive since 2006
Empowered citizens - The responsible citizen, 1984-1989
Invalid - Union not enough covered smile despite inner genius, 1985 to 1987
UWSH - Independent voters Community Schleswig-Holstein, from 1986 to about 1990
PEOPLE'S FRONT - popular front against reaction, fascism and war, founded in 1979, after 1980 no longer a party election
VL - United Left, founded in 1976, disbanded in 1982
VSP - United Socialist Party, founded in 1986 as a merger of the International Marxist Group and the KPD / ML; after 1986, no longer working party
5%-block, only federal election 1976 begun

=== Established 1990 - 2004 ===
AB 2000 - Party of alternatives Citizens Movement 2000 Germany, founded in 1998, disbanded in 2005
ADM - Alliance of Centre, founded in 2004, 2012 merger with German Conservative Party (2009)
AFC - Working for Bremen and Bremerhaven, founded in 1995, disbanded in 2002
ASP - Automobile Taxpayers Party Founded in 1993, disbanded in 2002
BFB - Confederation of Free Citizens, founded in 1994, 1998 merger with offensive for Germany to the Confederation of Free Citizens - Offensive for Germany - The Freedom Party, disbanded 2002
Chance 2000, 1998

BMV - founded Citizens Party MV initiative for Mecklenburg and Western Pomerania, 2002, 2006 merger with Independent State party Alliance for MV

DPD - Democratic Party of Germany (1995), founded in 1995, working party set after 1998
DLVH - German League for People and Homeland, founded in 1991, converted in 1996 in a club
DMP - The middle-class party - The civic center set, in 1997, Labour Party 2003
DL - Democratic Left, founded in 1999, last election: 2001 House of Representatives election
