= Anticapitalist Workers' Left =

Anticapitalist Workers' Left Izquierda Anticapitalista de los Trabajadores
- President: Bárbara Brito
- Secretary: Dauno Tótoro
- Founded: January 24, 2018
- Legalised: April 13, 2018
- Dissolved: October 20, 2020
- Preceded by: Revolutionary Workers Party
- Succeeded by: Revolutionary Workers Party
- Student wing: Vencer (Overcome)
- Youth wing: Agrupación Combativa Revolucionaria - Juventud Sin Miedo
- Women's wing: Pan y Rosas - Teresa Flores
- Teacher wing: Nuestra Clase
- Membership (2020): 3,137
- Ideology: Anti-capitalism; Trotskyism
- Political position: Far-left
- International affiliation: Trotskyist Fraction – Fourth International
- Colors: Red

The Anticapitalist Workers' Left (Spanish: Izquierda Anticapitalista de los Trabajadores, IAT) was a Trotskyist political party in Chile.

The party emerged after the Revolutionary Workers Party was dissolved by the Electoral Service after failing to obtain the necessary votes to survive in the 2017 general election.
