= European Anti-Capitalist Left =

Former anti-capitalist European political alliance

- Abbreviation: EACL
- President: Collective leadership
- Founded: March 2000
- Dissolved: 2013
- Headquarters: Brussels
- Ideology: Anti-capitalism; Socialism; Soft Euroscepticism
- Political position: Left-wing
- European Parliament group: The Left in the European Parliament
- Colours: Red, Black, White, Pink

Website
- www.anticapitalistleft.org (archived)

The European Anti-Capitalist Left (EACL) was a left-wing European political alliance.

The EACL took part in the Europe against Austerity Conference in 2011. In a 2013 Rosa Luxemburg Stiftung study, the EACL was listed as a European network for the last time.

== Ideology ==
Parties participating in the EACL are united in opposition to neo-liberalism and capitalism. The criteria for participation in its conferences are:

- A clear foundation in anti-capitalism, with the goal of achieving socialism.
- Recognition of the pluralist nature of the left, with no claim of a monopoly for their own organisation or viewpoint.
- Pursuit of common action of the left in general coalitions.
- Some degree of representation (in local, regional, or national legislatures) and anchoring in social movements.

Despite the last criterion, many organisations involved in the EACL, with the exception of the founding parties, are somewhat marginal groups, often of Trotskyist or Marxist–Leninist anti-revisionist persuasion which organize most vigorously through social movements and trade unions, rather than through electoral processes. The EACL emphasises an organizational need to carry out a great deal of extra-parliamentary activism.

== Participants ==
The following table is a list of participants in each meeting.

Country	Party	–	–	–	12th	11th	10th	9th	8th	7th	6th	5th	4th	3rd
Country	Party	2009	2008	2007	2006	2005	2005	2004	2004	2003	2003	2002	2002	2001
Country	Party	Strasbourg	Paris	Almada	Saint-Denis	London	Edinburgh	Amsterdam	Brussels	Paris	Athens	Copenhagen	Madrid	Brussels
Belgium	Revolutionary Communist League	Participant	Participant	No	No	No	No	No	No	No	No	No	No	No
Belgium	Left Socialist Party	Participant	No	No	No	No	No	No	No	No	No	No	No	No
Denmark	Red-Green Alliance	No	No	Participant	Participant	Participant	Participant	Participant	Participant	Participant	Participant	Unknown	Participant	Unknown
Germany	German Communist Party	No	No	No	Participant	Participant	No	No	No	No	Observer	Unknown	Observer	Unknown
Germany	International Socialist Left	Participant	No	No	No	No	No	No	No	No	No	No	No	No
Germany	Revolutionary Socialist League	Participant	No	No	No	No	No	No	No	No	No	No	No	No
Greece	Synaspismós	Participant	Participant	Observer	No	No	No	No	No	Participant	Observer	Unknown	No	Unknown
France	Revolutionary Communist League	No	Participant	Participant	Participant	Participant	Participant	Participant	Participant	Participant	Participant	Unknown	Participant	Unknown
France	New Anticapitalist Party	Participant	No	No	No	No	No	No	No	No	No	No	No	No
Ireland	Socialist Party	No	No	No	No	No	No	No	No	Participant	Observer	Unknown	No	Unknown
Ireland	People Before Profit	No	Participant	No	No	No	No	No	No	No	No	No	No	No
Italy	Party of Communist Refoundation	No	No	No	No	No	No	No	No	No	Participant	Unknown	Participant	Unknown
Luxembourg	The Left	No	No	No	No	No	No	Participant	Participant	Participant	No	Unknown	Participant	Unknown
Poland	Polish Labour Party	Participant	Participant	No	No	No	No	No	No	No	No	No	No	No
Portugal	Left Bloc	Participant	No	Participant	Participant	Participant	Participant	Participant	Participant	Participant	Participant	Unknown	Participant	Unknown
Sweden	Socialist Party	Participant	Participant	No	No	No	No	No	No	No	No	No	No	No
Switzerland	Solidarity	Participant	Participant	Participant	Participant	Participant	Participant	Participant	No	Participant	Participant	Unknown	Participant	Unknown
Switzerland	Movement for Socialism	Participant	Participant	No	No	No	No	No	No	No	No	No	No	No
Switzerland	Alternative Left	Participant	No	No	No	No	No	No	No	No	No	No	No	No
Spain	Alternative Space	No	No	No	Participant	Participant	Participant	Participant	Participant	Participant	Participant	Unknown	Participant	Unknown
Spain	Zutik	No	No	No	No	No	No	No	No	Participant	No	Unknown	Participant	Unknown
Spain	Red Current	No	No	No	No	No	No	No	No	No	No	Unknown	Observer	Unknown
Spain	United Left	No	No	No	No	No	No	Participant	No	No	No	Unknown	Observer	Unknown
Spain	United Alternative Left of Catalonia	No	No	No	Participant	Participant	Participant	No	Participant	Participant	Observer	Unknown	Observer	Unknown
Spain	Anticapitalist Left	Participant	Participant	No	No	No	No	No	No	No	No	No	No	No
Turkey	Freedom and Solidarity Party	No	No	No	Participant	No	No	Participant	No	Participant	Participant	Unknown	Participant	Unknown
United Kingdom	Scottish Socialist Party	Participant	No	No	Participant	Participant	Participant	Participant	Participant	Participant	Participant	Unknown	Participant	Unknown
United Kingdom	Socialist Alliance	No	No	No	No	No	No	No	No	Participant	Participant	Unknown	Participant	Unknown
United Kingdom	Socialist Workers Party	Participant	Participant	Participant	No	Participant	Participant	Participant	Participant	Participant	Participant	Unknown	Participant	Unknown
United Kingdom	Socialist Party	Participant	Participant	No	No	Participant	Participant	Participant	No	Participant	Observer	Unknown	No	Unknown
United Kingdom	Respect Party	No	No	No	Participant	Participant	Participant	Participant	Participant	No	No	No	No	No
United Kingdom	Socialist Resistance	Participant	No	No	No	No	No	No	No	No	No	No	No	No
United Kingdom	International Socialist Group	Participant	No	No	No	No	No	No	No	No	No	No	No	No

== See also ==
- Criticism of capitalism
- Post-capitalism
