= Communist Party of Germany (Roter Morgen) =

Communist Party of Germany (Roter Morgen) Kommunistische Partei Deutschlands – Roter Morgen
- Founded: 1985
- Dissolved: 2011
- Split from: KPD/ML
- Headquarters: Hamburg
- Newspaper: Roter Morgen
- Ideology: Communism; Marxism–Leninism; Anti-revisionism; Hoxhaism
- Political position: Far-left
- Colours: Red

Website
- http://www.kpd-net.de

The Communist Party of Germany (Red Dawn) (German: Kommunistische Partei Deutschlands – Roter Morgen; KPD – RM) was one of several minor communist political parties in Germany that split from the Communist Party of Germany/Marxists–Leninists (KPD/ML) upon the death of Ernst Aust in 1985.

== History and Ideology ==
A cover of "Roter Morgen" (issue 1/2007)

It was founded in December 1986 in Hamburg by members of the Communist Party of Germany/Marxists-Leninists who disapproved of that group's fusion with the Trotskyist Gruppe Internationale Marxisten, seeing it as betrayal of their Hoxhaist ideology.

The party was quoted in 1992 as declaring Israel "the most bloodthirsty and power-hungry bastion against the people".

The party published its own monthly newspaper Roter Morgen until its dissolution in 2011.

== Roter Oktober ==
Logo of Red October

Red October – Organisation for the construction of a Communist Party in Germany (German: Roter Oktober – Organisation zum Aufbau der Kommunistischen Partei in Deutschland), short form: RO, split from the KPD (Red Dawn) in December 2002 due to viewing their predecessor as false communists. The organisation itself wasn't a political party, but rather an association of communists with the eventual goal of constructing a vanguardist party able to bring about the dictatorship of the proletariat.

Red October dissolved in 2009, stating that they have failed their goal for the construction of a real communist party in Germany.

== See also ==
- List of anti-revisionist groups
