= Revolutionary Workers Party (Chile) =

Defunct political party in Chile

Revolutionary Workers Party Partido de Trabajadores Revolucionarios
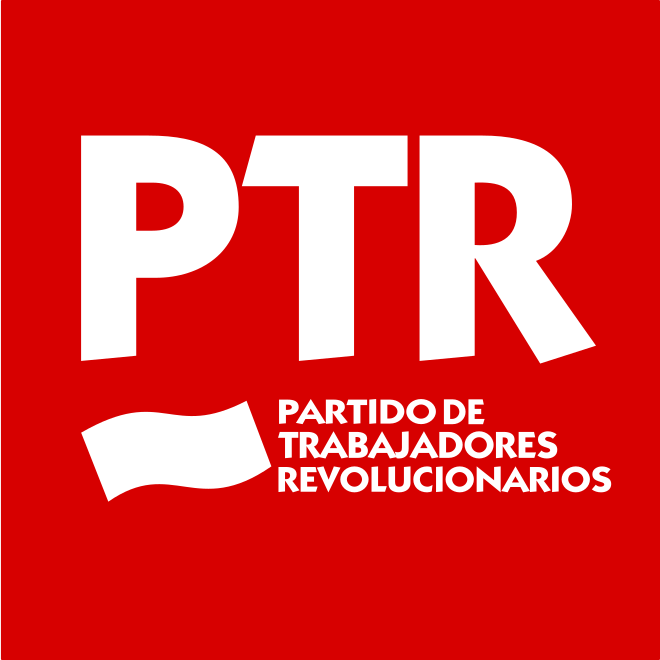
- President: Juan Gamboa
- Secretary: Dauno Tótoro
- Founded: 1999 (as CcC); 11 November 2011 (as PTR); 4 January 2017 (legally founded as political party)
- Legalised: 6 August 2017 28 October 2020
- Dissolved: 3 February 2022; 12 February 2026
- Succeeded by: Anticapitalist Workers' Left
- Student wing: Vencer (Overcome)
- Youth wing: Agrupación Combativa Revolucionaria - Juventud Sin Miedo
- Women's wing: Pan y Rosas - Teresa Flores
- Teacher wing: Nuestra Clase
- Membership (2017): 2,149
- Ideology: Anti-capitalism; Trotskyism
- Political position: Far-left
- International affiliation: Trotskyist Fraction – Fourth International
- Colors: Red
- Chamber of Deputies: 0 / 120
- Senate: 0 / 38

Website
- https://trabajadoresrevolucionarios.cl/

The Revolutionary Workers Party (Spanish: Partido de Trabajadores Revolucionarios, PTR) was a Trotskyist political party in Chile. It was founded in January 2017 and was the Chilean section of Trotskyist Fraction – Fourth International. The party lost official registration after failing to meet the 5% minimum vote threshold in the 2021 elections. It was dissolved again in 2026.

== History ==
=== As Class against Class ===
It started as the group Class against Class, a league formed in Chile by Trotskyist militants in order to form a revolutionary party. Upon the death of Augusto Pinochet, they denounced the impunity that continued under the government and the laws of the dictatorship that were still in force. In 2009, they made a demonstration in repudiation of the coup in Honduras; in that year they founded the Pan y Rosas - Teresa Flores women's group together with independent women activists for the organization of women workers in women's committees. After the 2011 student demonstrations, Class against Class achieved an organizational growth that allowed them to increase their militancy. For this reason they organized a congress in 2011 and became known as the Revolutionary Workers Party (PTR).

=== As PTR ===
After its change of name and orientation, the PTR promoted the Revolutionary Militant Group - Fearless Youth (ACR). The PTR is also a supporter of the struggle of the Mapuche people, launching a statement against the murder of the community member Rodrigo Melinao. For the 40th anniversary of Pinochet's coup, the PTR called to "sweep away the dictatorship's legacy." They also repudiated the murder of two students killed by police in a student demonstration in Valparaiso in 2015, participating in the marches that were made in response to it and they launched a campaign calling "to funier the parliament". Towards the end of the year, one of its leaders, Bárbara Brito, ran as a candidate for president of the FECH with the Unidas para Vencer list, managing to reach the vice-presidency in 2016. In early 2017 and after its 6th Congress, the PTR discussed the possibility of legalization, seeing a new stage in the political scene with the emergence of new phenomena such as the Broad Front. In January 2017, the PTR announced that it would begin its process to become legal as a political party.

=== Legalization ===
The party was legally registered on February 7, 2017. For the general election, the PTR presented candidates to deputies in the Antofagasta Region and the Santiago Metropolitan Region. Since they did not meet the requirements to maintain their legal status, in January 2018 it was agreed to create the instrumental party Anticapitalist Workers' Left (IAT) in order to merge with the PTR and maintain its existence. The General Council of the IAT decided to change the party's name back to Partido de Trabajadores Revolucionarios (PTR).
