= Isidro Leyva Leyva =

Mexican politician

Member of the Congress of Sonora Plurinominal
- In office 1985–1988

Personal details
- Born: 1952 or 1953 (age 73–74)
- Citizenship: Mexican
- Party: PRT
- Education: Universidad de Sonora (LLB)

Isidro Leyva Leyva (born 1952/1953) (Note: Leyva was 29 years old in 1982) is a Mexican trade unionist and politician. He served in the LI Legislature of the Congress of Sonora from 1985 to 1988 as a member of the now-defunct Workers' Revolutionary Party (PRT). He was later the director of the National Cattle Producers' Union from 2005 to 2021.

== Career ==
A native of Huásabas, Sonora, Leyva studied law at the Universidad de Sonora (Unison) and began his political activism as a student protester in the 1970s. He joined the Workers' Revolutionary Party (PRT) – a Trotskyist party with origins in the 1968 student protests – and got heavily involved in Sonoran farmers' and peasants' movements. Leyva was also allegedly a member of the Liga Comunista 23 de Septiembre, and as such, was arrested by the Federal Judicial Police in August 1977 and tortured before his release. He earned his law degree from Unison in 1982.

Leyva went on a ten-day tour of the Southwestern United States in the weeks leading up to the 1982 Mexican general election, which was the first national election contested by the PRT. He visited California, New Mexico, Arizona, and Texas in an effort to strengthen ties between the labor movements on both sides of the border. He promoted the PRT as a Socialist alternative for the working class and expressed his support for the PRT presidential nominee, Rosario Ibarra. Within the party, Leyva was a member of the regional leadership as well as the PRT Central Committee.

Leyva served as a local deputy in the LI Legislature of the Congress of Sonora from 1985 to 1988 via proportional representation, becoming the first and only member of the PRT to serve in the body. The PRT contested its final national election in 1991, after which it lost its registration as a national party. In 2006, Leyva was a pre-candidate to the Chamber of Deputies as a member of the Coalition for the Good of All, which was created by the Party of the Democratic Revolution (PRD), Convergence, and the Labor Party (PT).

A longtime supporter of workers' rights, Leyva was at the forefront of organizations such as the Frente Campesino Independiente Revolucionario and the Unión General Obrero, Campesina y Popular. Additionally, he was a founding member of the Unión Nacional de Productores de Ganado (UNPG; National Cattle Producers' Union), which he directed at the Sonora level until 2004. In August 2005, he took over as national director of the UNPG. He held this role until late 2021, when he was named the general director of ranching development by the SAGARHPA (Secretariat of Agriculture, Ranching, Hydraulic Resources, Fishing, and Aquaculture) Subsecretariat of Ranching.
