= Socialist Alliance (Mexico) =

2005 electoral alliance in Mexico

The Socialist Alliance (Spanish: Alianza Socialista) intended to be an electoral alliance in Mexico, proposed in November 2005 for the 2006 general elections. The alliance intended to include several Trotskyist factions that split off from the old Revolutionary Workers' Party (PRT). These included:

- Socialist Convergence (Convergencia Socialista)
- Socialist Unity League (Liga de Unidad Socialista)
- Socialist Collective (Colectivo Socialista)
- Labor and Socialist Unity (Unidad Obrera y Socialista)

== See also ==
- National Assembly of the Socialist Left
