= National Assembly of the Socialist Left =

Mexican socialist alliance

The National Assembly of the Socialist Left (Spanish: Asamblea Nacional de la Izquierda Socialista) was an alliance of left-wing and far-left groups in Mexico. The only assembly of the socialist left for the creation of a "Socialist Front" was held in Mexico City April 16–17, 2005.

The appeal inviting to the meeting was signed by the following:

- Socialist Alliance (Alianza Socialista)
- National Meeting of the Left (Encuentro Nacional de las Izquierdasz)
- New September 23 Movement (Nuevo Movimiento 23 de Septiembre, formerly Colectivo de exmillitantes del Movimiento Armado Socialista)
- Socialist Collective (Colectivo Socialista)
- Socialist Convergence (Convergencia Socialista)
- Marxist Collective of Colima (Colectivo Marxista de Colima)
- Union of Revolutionary Struggle - Collective of Reflection in Action (Unión de Lucha Revolucionaria (ULR)-Colectivo de Reflexión en la Acción)
- New Socialist Movement (Movimiento Socialismo Nuevo)
- Mexican Communist Party (marxist-leninist) (Partido Comunista Mexicano (marxista-leninista))
- Revolutionary Left Network of PRD (Red de Izquierda Revolucionaria del PRD)
- Democratic Convergence "Valentín Campa" (Convergencia Democrática "Valentín Campa")
- Current of Democratic Socialism (Corriente del Socialismo Democrático)
- Youth and Students Front "Ernesto Che Guevara" of REDIR (Frente de Jóvenes y Estudiantes "Ernesto Che Guevara" de REDIR)
- Health Workers Socialist Committee "Dr. Ernesto Che Guevara" (Comité Socialista de Trabajadores de la Salud "Dr. Ernesto Che Guevara")
- For a Different PRD of Sonora (Por un PRD Differente de Sonora)
- Workers League for Socialism (Liga de Trabajadores por el Socialismo)
- Socialist Fraternity Political Cell "Gastón García Cantú" of the Socialist Party of Mexico (Célula Política Fraternidad Socialista "Gastón García Cantú" del Partido Socialista de México)
- Regional Committee for the First Centenary of PSM (Comité Regional Primer Centenario del PSM)
- Popular Socialist Party (Partido Popular Socialista)
- Communist Party of the Valley of Mexico (Partido Comunista del Valle de México)
- Proletarian Political Organisation (Organización Política Proletaria)
- Party of the Communists (Partido de los Comunistas)
- Communist Party of Guerrero (Partido Comunista de Guerrero)
- Promiting Committee of the Unity of the Socialists of Michoacán (Comité Promotor de la Unidad de los Socialistas de Michoacán)
- Sustainable Development in Latin America (Desarrollo Sustentable en América Latina)
- Collective of ex-militants of MRP (Colectivo de exmilitantes del MRP)
- Democratic Broad Front (Frente Amplio Democrático)
- Democratic Movement for Socialism "Ricardo Flores Magón" (Movimiento Democrático por el Socialismo "Ricardo Flores Magón")
- Socialist Unity League (Liga de Unidad Socialista)
- Movimiento Magisterial del Sindicato de Maestros al Servicio del Edo.de México
- Polytechnic National Coordination (Coordinadora Nacional Politécnica)
- Revolutionary Popular Front (Frente Popular Revolucionario)
- Che Guevara Cell (Célula Che Guevara)
- Frente Democrático 23 Sección X SNTE
- Alliance of Social Organisations (Alianza de Organizaciones Sociales (AOS-GAM))
- Barricade Collective of Independent Youth of Ecatepec (Colectivo Barricada de Jóvenes Independientes de Ecatepec)
- CRISOL
- Citizens Dignity (Dignidad Ciudadana)
- Foro Permanente de Comisión de la Verdad
- Citizens Pact (Pacto Ciudadano)
- Citizens Power (Poder Ciudadano)
- Modern Times (Tiempos Modernos)
- UJRM-FPR
- Workers and Socialist Unity (Unidad Obrera y Socialista)
- Communitarian Context (Contexto Comunitario)
- Movement of Popular Struggle (Movimiento de Lucha Popular)
- Socialist Movement of the Northern Frontier (Movimiento Socialista de la Frontera Norte)
