= LIII Legislature of the Mexican Congress =

Legislature of the Congress of the Union

53rd Congress (LIII Legislatura)
←	52nd	54th	→
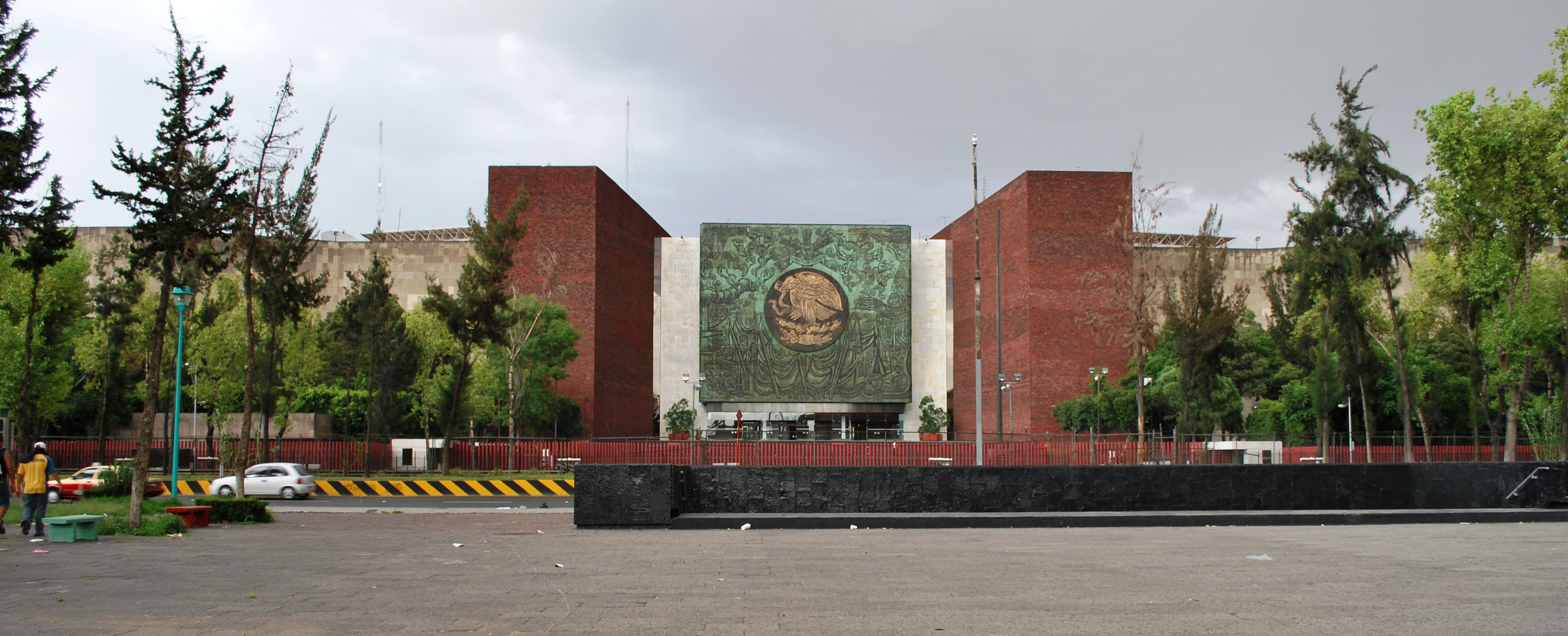
- Legislative Palace of San Lázaro

Overview
- Term: 1 September 1985 – 31 August 1988

Senate
- Members: 64 senators

Chamber of Deputies
- Members: 400 deputies

The LIII Legislature of the Congress of the Union of Mexico (53rd Congress) was made up of senators and deputies members of their respective chambers. They began duties on 1 September 1985 and ended on 31 August 1988.

The senators of this legislature were elected in the 1982 election and also exercised their positions in the previous session of Congress. The deputies were elected in the 1985 election.

== Deputies ==
Match	Deputies Relative majority	Deputies Proportional Rep.	Total
National Action Party	9	32	41
Authentic Party of the Mexican Revolution	2	9	11
Mexican Democratic Party	0	12	12
Mexican Workers Party	0	6	6
Socialist People's Party	0	11	11
Institutional Revolutionary Party	289	0	289
Workers' Revolutionary Party	0	6	6
Socialist Workers Party	0	12	12
Unified Socialist Party of Mexico	0	6	6
Total	300	100	400
Source: .

== List of members ==
- Antonio Riva Palacio (speaker of the senate)
- Rosario Ibarra

== See also ==
- Congress of the Union
- Mexico Chamber of Deputies
- Senate of the Republic (Mexico)
