= Revolutionary Internationalist Organisation =

Revolutionary Internationalist Organization Revolutionäre Internationalistische Organisation
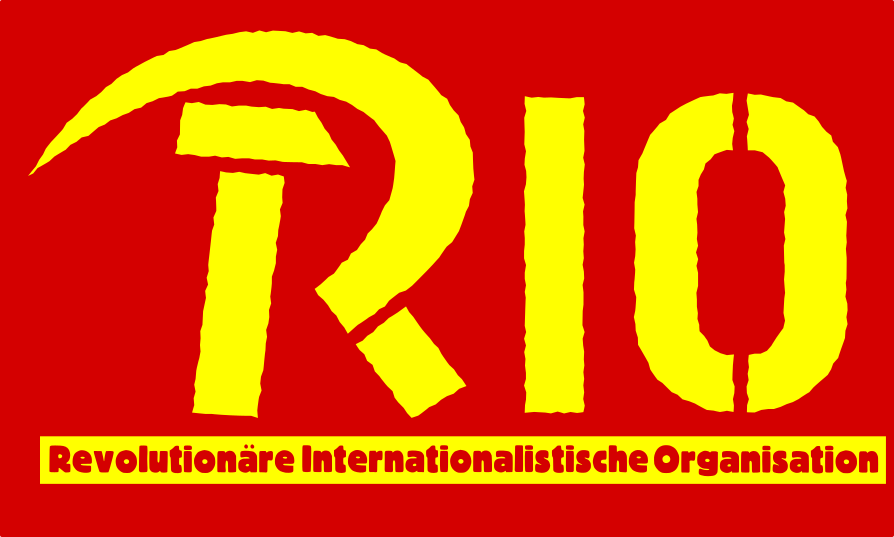
- Founded: 2007 (as iRevo); 2010 (as RIO)
- Split from: REVOLUTION
- Newspaper: Klasse Gegen Klasse
- Student wing: Waffen der Kritik
- Women's wing: Brot und Rosen
- Ideology: Communism; Trotskyism; Revolutionary socialism
- Political position: Far-left
- International affiliation: Trotskyist Fraction – Fourth International

Website
- klassegegenklasse.org

The Revolutionary Internationalist Organization (RIO) is a political group in Germany advocating for the dissemination of socialist and internationalist ideas. It is the publisher of the online newspaper Klasse Gegen Klasse and part of the international newspaper network La Izquierda Diario. The RIO aims to achieve societal changes toward a classless society and supports social movements internationally. Its ideology is based on Marxist, Trotskyist, and internationalist principles.

== Founding and development ==
The RIO emerged in January 2010 from the Independent Revolution (iRevo), a faction within the youth organization REVOLUTION, consisting of the sections in Germany, Switzerland, the Czech Republic and Australia. The iRevo split from REVOLUTION in 2007 due to its desire to sever ties with the League for the Fifth International. In 2009, the iRevo completely separated from REVOLUTION and founded its own organization in January 2010 under the name Revolutionary Internationalist Organization (RIO). Initially operating in three countries—Germany, Switzerland, and the Czech Republic—RIO joined a new, larger Trotskyist umbrella organization. In the same time iRevo members joined the New Left Anti-Capitalist Party of the Czech Republic, but were expelled because of differences with the party leadership.

Its members participated in demonstrations and student strikes during 2009 and 2010. Following extensive discussions with various Trotskyist tendencies, RIO joined in August 2011 as a sympathizing section of the Trotskyist Fraction – Fourth International, and two years later, it was recognized as a full-fledged section. two years later, it would be added as a full section.

== Activities and platforms ==
Within the RIO, the Marxist student group Waffen der Kritik (WdK) and the worker group KGK Workers serve as significant platforms, publishing articles and analyses on political subjects. They utilize the online magazine Klasse Gegen Klasse to illuminate societal debates from a Marxist perspective. WdK actively engages in university committees for Palestine at universities in Berlin, Munich, and Münster.

== Political orientation and activism ==
The RIO advocates for a classless society, rejects imperialism and wars, and calls for solidarity with global social movements. The organization participates in demonstrations and political actions to promote social justice, climate protection, and solidarity. RIO has participated in various mobilizations against racism and the advance of the far-right in Germany, it supports the struggle for the self-determination of Kurdistan and promotes the digital newspaper Klasse Gegen Klasse (Class against Class) in German and with a sub-portal in Turkish.

Various articles mention the RIO and Klasse Gegen Klasse in the context of political debates and actions. Reports indicate their involvement in demonstrations and protests, such as the Internationalist May 1st Demonstration in Berlin.

Within the online Newspaper Klasse Gegen Klasse, the RIO publishes articles on political and social subjects, supporting causes such as a more democratic university, climate justice, and fair working conditions. Additionally, under the name 'Podcast von Klasse Gegen Klasse', RIO operates its own podcast and a YouTube channel. Furthermore, members of the RIO regularly appear on other podcasts and panel discussions, addressing topics such as protests in France, political developments in various countries, and the establishment of a left-wing revolutionary party.

== Criticism ==
The RIO and its groups have both supporters and critics. Criticisms relate to their ideology and political positions, occasionally accusing them of extremist or anti-Israeli views. Moreover, political differences between RIO and other groups have been highlighted, concerning issues such as the assessment of Russia and China, characterizing the SPD as a bourgeois workers' party, the war in Ukraine, the Syrian civil war, women's oppression, and other topics.

Regarding the Middle East conflict, RIO maintains an anti-Zionist, anti-imperialist position, which some media interpret as antisemitic. RIO refutes these allegations and emphasizes their call for equal rights for Jews and Palestinians in a "free, secular, multiethnic socialist Palestine" as well as their fight against antisemitism.

== Confusions ==
On December 20, 2023, the Westfälische Nachrichten erroneously published an article claiming that the online magazine Klasse Gegen Klasse was part of the militant organization Klasse gegen Klasse. This assumption was based on the similarity in names between KgK and the mentioned online magazine. There is no connection to KgK due to substantive differences regarding the question of militant actions, arising from the Trotskyist orientation of the Revolutionary Internationalist Organization.
