= 1991 Mexican legislative election =

← 1988	18 August 1991	1994 →
- Chamber of Deputies
- All 500 seats in the Chamber of Deputies
Party	Leader	Vote %	Seats	+/–
PRI	Luis Donaldo Colosio	61.43	320	+60
PAN	Luis H. Álvarez	17.67	89	−12
PRD	Cuauhtémoc Cárdenas	8.31	41	New
PFCRN	Rafael Aguilar Talamantes	4.33	23	−15
PARM	Carlos Cantú Rosas	2.14	15	−15
PPS	Indalecio Sáyago Herrera	1.80	12	−25
This lists parties that won seats. See the complete results below.
- Senate
- 32 of the 64 seats in the Senate of the Republic
Party	Leader	Vote %	Seats	+/–
PRI	Luis Donaldo Colosio	61.54	61	+1
PAN	Luis H. Álvarez	17.70	1	+1
PRD	Cuauhtémoc Cárdenas	3.79	2	New
This lists parties that won seats. See the complete results below.
Senate results by state

Legislative elections were held in Mexico on 18 August 1991, alongside gubernatorial elections in six states. The Institutional Revolutionary Party (PRI) won 320 of the 500 seats in the Chamber of Deputies and 31 of the 32 seats up for election in the Senate. Voter turnout was 61% in the Chamber election and 62% in the Senate election.

== Background ==
Prior to the legislative elections, a historic milestone occurred in 1989 when Ernesto Ruffo Appel of the National Action Party (PAN) was elected governor of Baja California in state elections, becoming the first governor not from the PRI in sixty years. This started a succession of state election victories for the PAN and the Party of the Democratic Revolution (PRD).

The Federal Electoral Institute (IFE), an independent public organization tasked with organizing elections for the presidency and Congress, officially came into being on 11 October 1990.

== Electoral system ==
Of the 500 members of the Chamber of Deputies, 300 were elected in single-member districts by first-past-the-post voting, while 200 were elected by proportional representation. In order to assure absolute legitimacy and reliability for the 1991 elections, an entirely new electoral roll was created without reference to previous rolls. In 1991 there were an estimated 45 million citizens over the age of 18, and an electoral roll of over 39 million people was created in eight months.

Half of the 64 Senate seats were up for election.

== Campaign ==
The election campaign was largely focussed on economic issues, and the elections were characterised by some political commentators as a referendum on the economic reforms of President Carlos Salinas de Gortari.

== Results ==
=== Senate ===
Party	Votes	%	Seats			
Party	Votes	%	Won	Not up	Total	+/–
Institutional Revolutionary Party	14,256,447	61.54	31	30	61	+1
National Action Party	4,100,287	17.70	1	0	1	+1
Party of the Cardenist Front of National Reconstruction	1,202,425	5.19	0	0	0	0
PPS–PRD Alliance	1,109,450	4.79	0	0	0	0
Party of the Democratic Revolution	878,115	3.79	0	2	2	New
Authentic Party of the Mexican Revolution	487,258	2.10	0	0	0	0
Ecologist Party of Mexico	326,251	1.41	0	0	0	New
Mexican Democratic Party	276,661	1.19	0	0	0	0
Labor Party	258,510	1.12	0	0	0	0
Workers' Revolutionary Party	156,918	0.68	0	0	0	0
Popular Socialist Party	97,780	0.42	0	0	0	0
Non-registered candidates	14,284	0.06	0	0	0	0
Total	23,164,386	100.00	32	32	64	0
Valid votes	23,164,386	95.32				
Invalid/blank votes	1,138,260	4.68				
Total votes	24,302,646	100.00				
Registered voters/turnout	39,517,979	61.50				
Source: IFE, IPU, Nohlen

=== Chamber of Deputies ===
Party	Party-list			Constituency			Total seats	+/–
Party	Votes	%	Seats	Votes	%	Seats	Total seats	+/–
Institutional Revolutionary Party	14,145,234	61.43	30	14,051,349	61.43	290	320	+60
National Action Party	4,068,712	17.67	79	4,042,316	17.67	10	89	–12
Party of the Democratic Revolution	1,913,174	8.31	41	1,900,750	8.31	0	41	New
Party of the Cardenist Front of National Reconstruction	998,158	4.33	23	990,440	4.33	0	23	–15
Authentic Party of the Mexican Revolution	492,514	2.14	15	489,732	2.14	0	15	–15
Popular Socialist Party	414,780	1.80	12	411,848	1.80	0	12	–25
Ecologist Party of Mexico	332,603	1.44	0	329,714	1.44	0	0	New
Labor Party	260,266	1.13	0	258,595	1.13	0	0	New
Mexican Democratic Party	249,915	1.09	0	248,431	1.09	0	0	0
Workers' Revolutionary Party	136,341	0.59	0	135,360	0.59	0	0	0
Non-registered candidates	13,911	0.06	0	13,897	0.06	0	0	New
Total	23,025,608	100.00	200	22,872,432	100.00	300	500	0
Valid votes	23,025,608	95.17		22,872,432	95.17			
Invalid/blank votes	1,168,631	4.83		1,160,050	4.83			
Total votes	24,194,239	100.00		24,032,482	100.00			
Registered voters/turnout	39,517,979	61.22		39,517,979	60.81			
Source: Nohlen
