= Socialist Workers Movement (Mexico) =

Socialist Workers' Movement Movimiento de los Trabajadores Socialistas
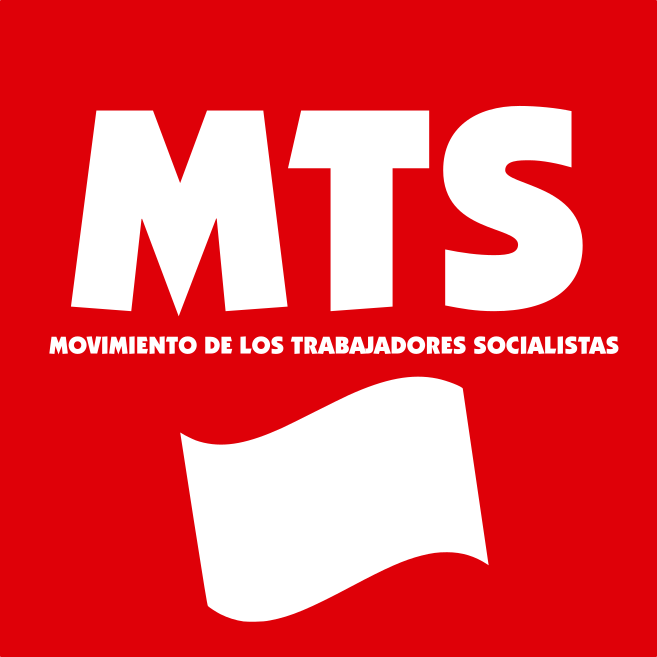
- Founded: 1988 (as LTS, later LTS-CC); 2014 (as MTS)
- Headquarters: Mexico City, Mexico
- Newspaper: Estrategia Obrera (1997–2014); Tribuna Socialista (2014–2015); La Izquierda Diario (2015–)
- Think tank: Leon Trotsky Study, Research and Publishing Center (CEIP León Trotsky)
- Youth wing: Contracorriente (1997–2012); Juventud Anticapitalista, Socialista y Revolucionaria (2012–2014); Agrupación Juvenil Anticapitalista (2014–)
- Women's wing: Pan y Rosas
- Teacher wing: Nuestra Clase
- Ideology: Trotskyism; Revolutionary socialism
- Political position: Far-left
- International affiliation: Trotskyist Fraction – Fourth International
- Colours: Red

Website
- mtsmexico.org

The Socialist Workers Movement (MTS) is a far-left Mexican National Political Association. It was formed in 2014 by the former League of Workers for Socialism – Countercurrent (Liga de Trabajadores por el Socialismo – Contracorriente, LTS-CC) for registration with the National Electoral Institute.

== History ==
Its origins date back to 1988 when a section of the Worker Socialist Party (POS, then called Zapatist Workers Party) was expelled in January of that year. The expelled group formed the "Trotskyist Revolutionary Fraction", then adopting the name League of Workers for Socialism (LTS).

The LTS released statements in 1994 during the Chiapas conflict calling for the army's exit from Chiapas and defined that after the emergence of the Zapatistas, a pre-revolutionary situation has been opened in Mexico with the irruption of peasants and indigenous people in Chiapas. The LTS had acriticisms of the EZLN's strategy during negotiations with the government, saying that the peace talks and the San Andrés Pact signed between the PRI and the EZLN in 1995 were a departure from the worker and peasant unrest and prevented the spread of struggle for land and the unity of the demands of all the people in one revolutionary movement against the government. They called for the left and the Mexican workers and peasants to maintain an independent struggle against the NAFTA and the revolutionary overthrow of the government.

In 1997 the student group Contracorriente (Countercurrent) was formed, integrated by students of the LTS and independent students with a platform of struggle for a university to serve the workers and the people. From this date begins its university activism and in 2000, Contracorriente took a leading part in the UNAM student movement of 1999–2000, being supporters of the UNAM strike against rising fees. Thus Contracorriente was added to the General Strike Council (CGH) along with thousands of students and repeatedly had delegates with representative vote within the CGH. Achieving an influence on schools, such as The Law and Philosophy faculties, and the Acatlán and Social Work UNAM schools, after the UNAM strike the LTS multiplied by the merging of the LTS and Contracorriente.

In 2000, they denounced the negotiated transition as a trap, where PRI, PAN and PRD sought to maintain the regime's stability with an electoral change while maintaining the features of recent decades and its economic plans of hunger and misery.

The MTS supports the reconstruction of the Fourth International, founded in 1938 by Leon Trotsky. It currently has influence on the UNAM and other universities in Mexico.

In 2006, they took a leading part in the struggle in Oaxaca, organizing solidarity with the APPO and the fight against electoral fraud.

Until 2014, they edited the newspaper Estrategia Obrera (Worker Strategy), but after the First LTS Congress (held in 2014 after obtaining political legality), they decided to push Socialist Tribune as their newspaper. Since 2004 they impart the Free Cathedra Karl Marx with agendas seeking to recover and interpret current events from Marxism in university classrooms.

With the struggle of the Mexican Electricians Union against the disappearance of Luz y Fuerza del Centro (Mexican Light and Power Company), LTS workers drove the formation of a worker and class tendency, forming solidarity committees with this struggle and with their worker youth Barricade performing a concert in solidarity with the SME in Ecatepec, with the assistance of thousand people.

Since 2010 some militants of the LTS along with independent women created the women's group Pan y Rosas (Bread and Roses), an organization that also exists in other Latin American countries and during the earthquake in Haiti prompted an international campaign for the departure of the UN and MINUSTAH troops in that country. They participated in the National Women Encounter in Zacatecas and more recently promoted an international campaign against femicide in Mexico.

Also in 2010, the LTS formed the publishing house Armas de la Crítica (Weapons of criticism), whose first publication was the book Pan y Rosas: Pertenencia de género y antagonismo de clase en el capitalismo (Bread and Roses: gender belonging and class antagonism in capitalism) by Andrea D'Atri; later Armas de la Crítica released México en Llamas (Mexico Ablaze): a book telling the little-known anti-capitalist side of the Mexican Revolution.

In 2012, the LTS actively participated in the #YoSoy132 movement with an anti-capitalist and class independence perspective, which generated antipathy toward them in some moderate sectors of movement. In the heat of this process, it was decided to dissolve Contracorriente and create the Juventud Anticapitalista, Socialista y Revolucionaria (Anti-capitalist, Socialist and Revolutionary Youth) with independent youths and members of the YoSoy132's left wing.

In late 2013, the LTS prompted a campaign for political legality as a National Political Association. In May 2014, the INE granted them legality and the LTS renamed itself as MTS.

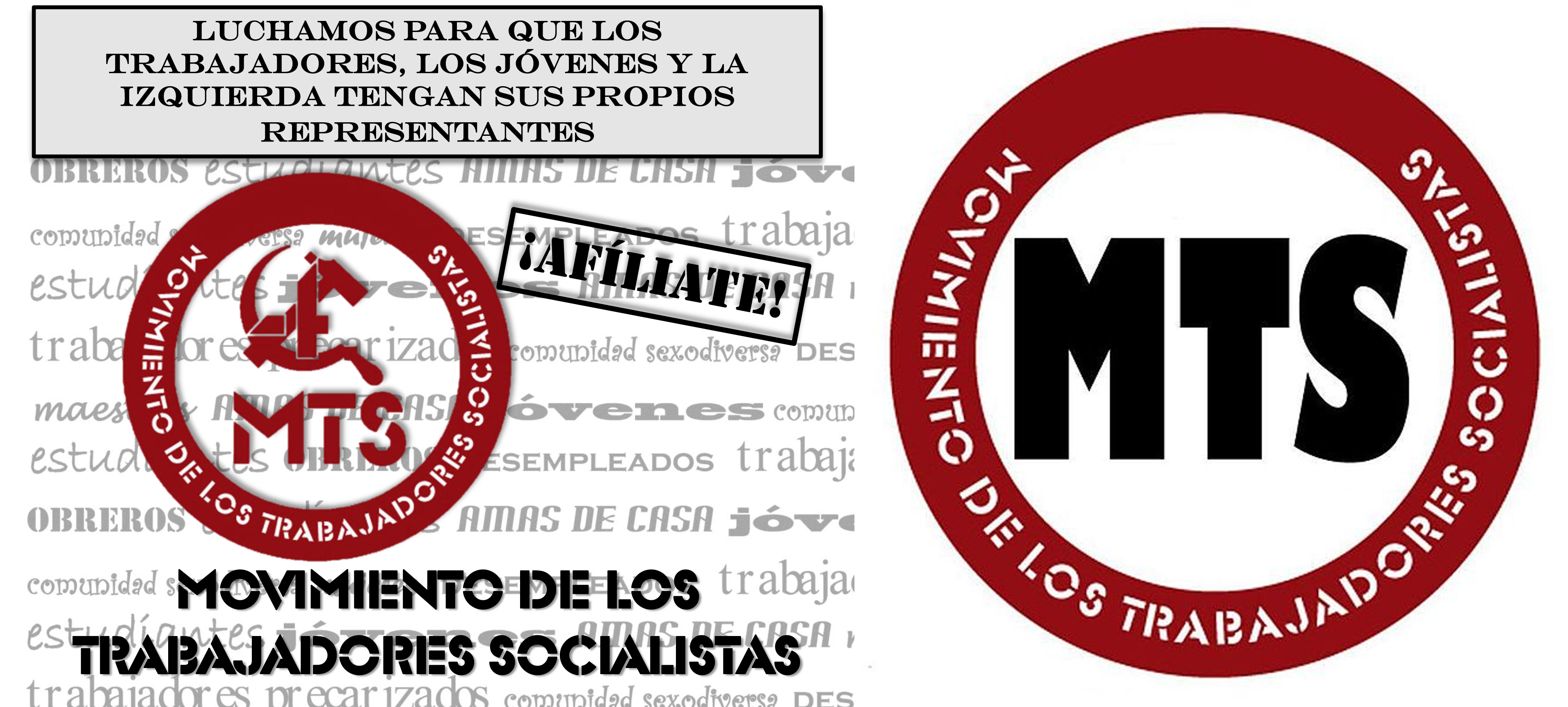
Original logo proposed by the MTS during its legalization process.

In 2014 were participants in the movement resulting from the Iguala Massacre, denouncing the complicity of the three levels of government in the disappearance of the normalistas. They have also been present in the struggle for political independence of trade unions, including the Telephone Operators’ Savings Bank Administrators’ Union (SNTCAT) and the Honda Mexico United Workers Union (STUHM). Since 2015, the MTS prompted a new media, La Izquierda Diario, as part of an international network of digital newspapers. In 2016, after the Political Reform of the Federal District, the MTS decided to participate in the election of the Constituent Assembly of Mexico City with an independent candidacy. Released as the Anti-capitalist 5th Formula and headed by professors Sergio Moissen and Sulem Estrada, they obtained about 11 thousand votes (6% of the people voting for independent in the electoral roll), being the first socialist candidacy in the country after decades of proscription to the anti-capitalist left. They did so again in 2018 contending for the 32nd District in the Coyoacán borough, obtaining 2,863 votes.

== Electoral results ==
Election year	Logo	Municipality/District	Formula	Candidate	Overall # of votes obtained	% of votes obtained	Seats
2016		Constituent Assembly of Mexico City	Formula 5 – Anticapitalists to the Constituent Assembly	Sergio Abraham Méndez Moissen	10,720	0.51	0 / 100
2018		32nd Local District – Coyoacán	Anticapitalistas al Congreso de la Ciudad de México	Juana Mirna Sulem Estrada Saldaña	2,863	1.85	0 / 66
