= Luis Emilio Recabarren =

Chilean politician (1876–1924)

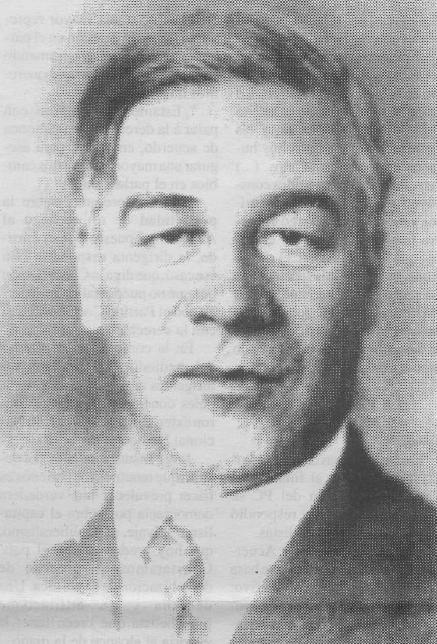

Member of the Chamber of Deputies of Chile
- In office 15 May 1921 – 15 May 1924
- Preceded by: Manuel Vargas
- Succeeded by: Luis Latrille Parra
- Constituency: Antofagasta
- In office 5 June 1906 – 5 June 1906 (Note: Recabarren was prevented from exercising his functions as a deputy in 1906, as he refused to swear an oath on the Bible upon taking office.)
- Preceded by: Francisco Ignacion Abarca González
- Succeeded by: Lindorfo Alarcón Hevia
- Constituency: Antofagasta

Personal details
- Born: Luis Emilio Recabarren Serrano; 6 July 1876 Valparaíso, Chile
- Died: 19 December 1924 (aged 48) Santiago de Chile, Chile
- Party: Democrat Party (1894–1912); Socialist Workers' Party (1912–1922); Communist Party of Chile (1922–1924)
- Parent(s): José Agustín Recabarren; Juana Rosa Serrano
- Occupation: Typographer

Luis Emilio Recabarren Serrano (Spanish pronunciation: [lwis eˈmiljo rekaˈβaren]; 6 July 1876 – 19 December 1924) was a Chilean political figure. He was elected several times as deputy, and was the driving force behind the worker's movement in Chile. He founded the Socialist Workers' Party in 1912.

== Early life ==
Recabarren was born in the port of Valparaíso in 1876, to José Agustín Recabarren and Juana Rosa Serrano. He was of Basque descent. His family was very impoverished. From a very early age, he worked as a typographer to help with his family's finances. Even though he had very little formal education, he was a voracious reader and was self-taught. He married Guadalupe del Canto, with whom he fathered two children. After the death of his first wife, he married Teresa Flores, who helped him with his political activities.

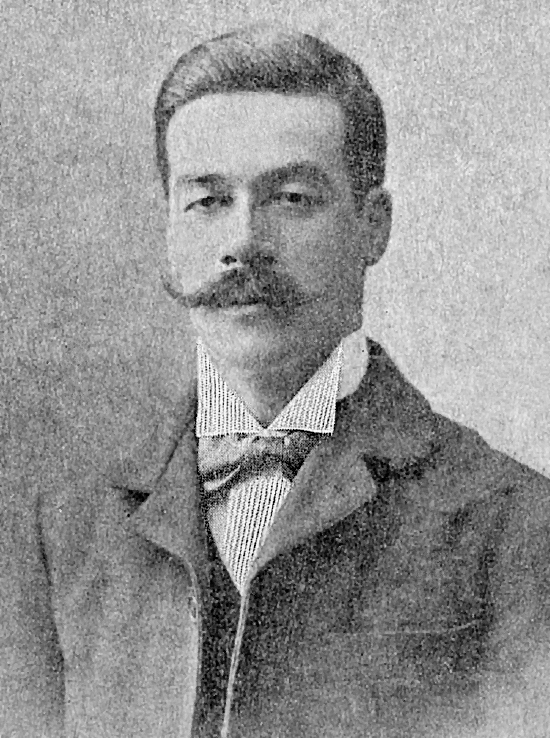
Recabarren in 1906

After a trip to Antofagasta, Taltal and Tocopilla, Recabarren became aware of the extreme poverty and near-enslavement of the nitrate workers. He decided to act. In 1894, he joined the Democrat Party of Chile. He became an ardent public speaker and founded several organizations and newspapers to foment solidarity among the workers. He initially focussed his political activities on the city of his birth, where he became director and editor of the newspaper El Trabajo (Work). In response to his harsh criticisms of governmental labour policies, he was jailed for eight months. In 1905 he moved with his family to Antofagasta, where he became the publisher of the newspaper La Vanguardia (Vanguard).

== Political career ==
On 15 May 1906 Recabarren was elected as a deputy for Tocopilla to the National Congress representing the Democrat Party. He was prevented though from assuming his position because he refused to be sworn on a bible, based on his atheism. He moved his family to Iquique. Heavily involved in the labour movement, organising workers both politically and industrially, as a consequence of which he was re-prosecuted by the government and had to escape to Argentina. In that country he joined the Socialist Party of Argentina and in 1908 he travelled to Europe (Spain, France and Belgium), finally returning to Chile at the end of that year.

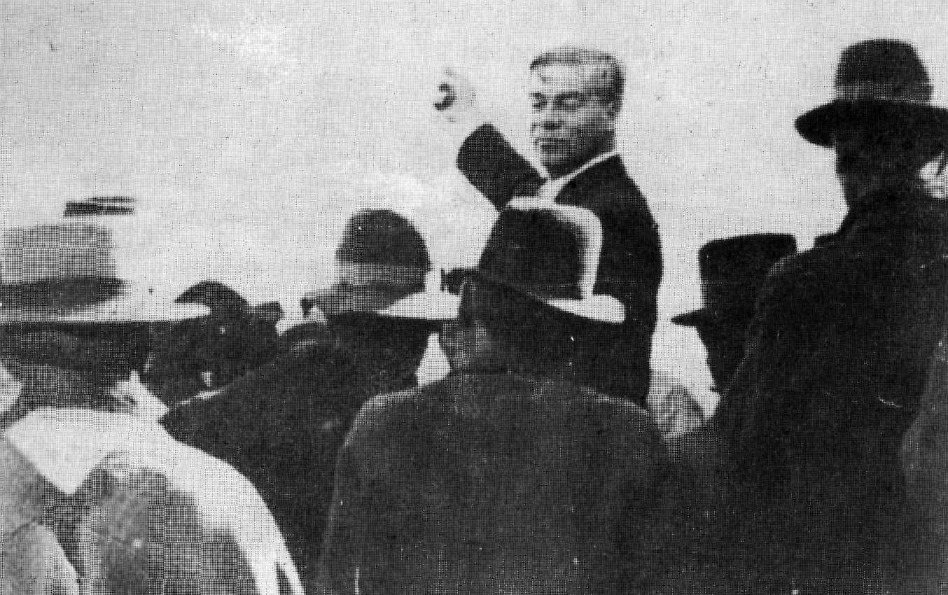
Recabarren giving a speech to workers

After his return, Recabarren was arrested and sent to jail in Los Andes for 18 months, from February 1909 until August 1910. In 1911 he moved back to Iquique where, unhappy with his party and together with a group of nitrate workers, he founded the Socialist Workers' Party (POS) on 4 June 1912. Previously, on 20 May that year, he had founded the El Despertar de los trabajadores (The Awakening of the Workers) newspaper to promote his ideas. During its existence (1912–1926) the newspaper was banned several times, but Recabarren continued preaching his socialist credo from any tribune he could get.

"Reading is one of the means of emancipation for the working classes. That is why we recommend that they read widely."
Luis Emilio Recabarren

He moved, this time to Antofagasta, where he founded El Socialista (The Socialist) newspaper, and El Comunista. In 1915 he was a candidate for Congress for Antofagasta, but was defeated (probably due to massive fraud). He then moved back to Valparaíso where he lived until 1916, when he started a tour along Chile all the way to Punta Arenas. In 1918 he travelled to Argentina where he participated in the foundation of the Communist Party of Argentina, becoming a member of its first national directory.

After his return to Chile, he participated in the third Congress of his party, where they agreed to join the Third International and become the Communist Party of Chile. In 1919 he was deported to the south of the country for three months for speaking against the government. He was a candidate for the Chilean presidential election of 1920, where he lost to Arturo Alessandri. At the time of that election he was re-incarcerated so he could not campaign and got a very small proportion of the vote. Nonetheless he was elected a deputy for Antofagasta again in 1921. After he moved to Santiago, he founded and edited La Justicia (Justice) newspaper.

Fascinated by the October Revolution, and after the party congress of 22 January 1922 that transformed the Socialist Workers Party (POS) into the Communist Party of Chile (PCCh), he travelled to the USSR as the only Chilean delegate to the Union Congress of the Third International that took place in Moscow. He returned in January 1923 to a hero's welcome by the various workers' organizations.

== Death ==
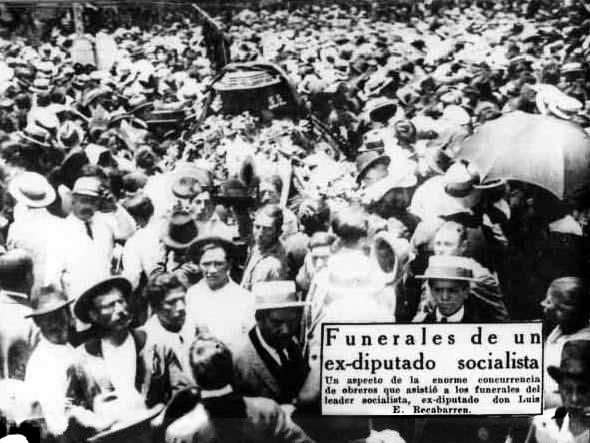
Funeral of Luis Emilio Recabarren (1924)

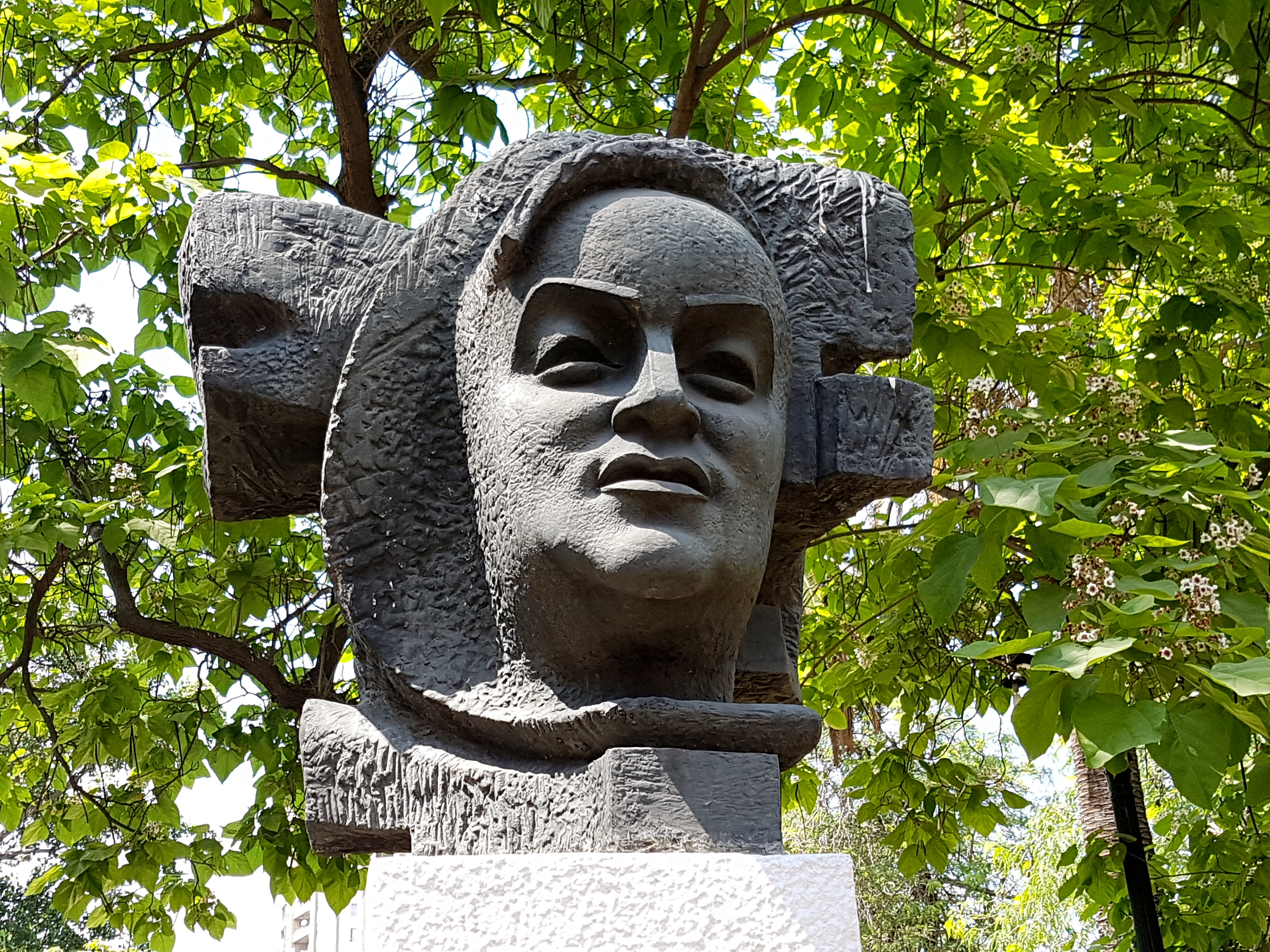
Monument of Luis Emilio Recabarren in Chile

Recabarren, for all his fiery rhetoric, was a very sensitive person. After his return to Chile his ideals and projects were bitterly attacked by the majority of the central committee of the Communist Party of Chile, who accused him of being excessively soft and liberal and too much in accord with the social-democratic ideas and not enough in agreement with the opinions of the Comintern. These harsh criticisms, on top of personal and family problems as well as health issues, caused a severe depression. He refused to run for deputy in the 1924 elections and on December 19 of the same year he committed suicide in Santiago at the age of 48.

== Works ==
Luis Emilio Recabarren placed great emphasis on the persuasive power of the printed word, producing numerous short pamphlets and booklets in simple, direct language on specific topics.He personally printed them, often containing the text of lectures he had just delivered. After speaking to an attentive audience, he would step down from the platform and sell the pamphlets on the spot. His theoretical writings began in 1910 with the lecture-turned-pamphlet Ricos y pobres a través de un siglo de vida republicana (Rich and Poor Through a Century of Republican Life), the latter being one of his best-known and most widely disseminated texts—a key and fundamental writing within Chilean socialist thought—popularized under the abbreviation of Ricos y pobres (Rich and Poor).

=== Selected publications ===
- 1906: Mi juramento (My Oath, debate in the Chamber of Deputies regarding the lack of recognition of the legitimacy of Recabarren's election as deputy for Taltal and Tocopilla).
- 1910: La huelga de Iquique. La teoría de la igualdad (The Iquique Strike. The Theory of Equality), Ricos y pobres (Rich and Poor, speech given in Rengo on the occasion of the first centenary of the Independence).
- 1912: El socialismo: ¿Qué es y cómo se realizará? (Socialism: What Is it and How Will It Be Implemented?, originally published as a serial in Iquique's newspaper El Despertar de los Trabajadores, between October and November of the same year).
- 1914: Patria y patriotismo (Homeland and Patriotism, conference given in Iquique during a controversial event sparked by the reactionary newspaper El Nacional).
- 1916: La mujer y su educación (Women and Their Education, Conference given on July 8 at the Workers' Federation)
- 1917: La materia eterna e inteligente (Eternal and Intelligent Matter)
- 1921: ¿Qué queremos federados y socialistas? (What Do We Want, Federated Members and Socialists?, a draft constitution for the Socialist Federal Republic of Chile), Desdicha obrera. Dramita social en tres cuadros (Worker's Misery. A Social Drama in Three Scenes), Primeros pasos: Los albores de la revolución social en Chile (First Steps: The Dawn of the Social Revolution in Chile, typographic version of the speech delivered in front of the Chamber of Deputies on July 15, 1921), El sembrador de odios (The Sower of Hatred).
- 1923: Rusia obrera y campesina (Working-class and Peasant Russia), Discursos y poesías (Speeches and Poems).

== Bibliography ==
- Patria y patriotismo Antofagasta : 1971 (Imprentas Unidas) (in Spanish)
- Proceso oficial contra la Sociedad Mancomunal de Tocopilla : respuesta a la acusación fiscal Santiago de Chile : 1905 (Imprenta Mejma, A. Poblete Garín) (in Spanish)
- El pensamiento de Luis Emilio Recabarrren. Santiago de Chile : Austral, 1971. 2v Colección Biblioteca Nacional) (in Spanish)
- La Rusia obrera y campesina Obras escogidas / Luis Emilio Recabarren; estudio preliminar, recopilación, bibliografía y presentación por Julio César Jobet, Jorge I. Barría y Luis Vitale. Santiago : Edit. Recabarren, 1965. (in Spanish)
- Archivo Luis Emilio Recabarren in marxists.org
- Luis Emilio Recabarren (1876–1924) en Memoría Chilena
- Jobet, Julio César. 1955. Luis Emilio Recabarren. Los orígenes del movimiento obrero y del socialismo chilenos. (Prensa Latinoamericana. Santiago)
- Witker, Alejandro. 1977. Los trabajos y los días de Recabarren. (Nuestro Tiempo. México, D.F.)
- María Alicia, Rueda. 2020. The Educational Philosophy of Luis Emilio Recabarren: Pioneering Working-Class Education in Latin America
