= Revolution (political group) =

British revolutionary socialist youth organisation

Revolution, or Revo, a revolutionary socialist youth organisation, was founded in the UK by Workers Power, part of the League for the Fifth International. According to its statutes and manifesto it is organisationally independent from Workers Power, although there are disagreements about the degree of independence (independent members viewing it as subordinate to LFI, LFI arguing that since its international and national councils have sovereignty, it is independent). It has official sections in the United Kingdom, Germany, Sweden, Austria, Czech Republic, Pakistan, Sri Lanka, Nepal and the USA.

It was formed in the mid-1990s at the beginning of the anti-capitalist movement in Europe. Participation in the EuroMarches in Amsterdam and support for the Liverpool Dockers strike were amongst its first campaigns. Now the group participates in the anti-capitalist movement and anti-war movements. It has raised the slogan for a Youth International to come out of the European Social Forum and World Social Forum bodies to unite the struggles of young people against globalisation and imperialism.

In 2006, following a split in the League for the Fifth International, a part of Revo left the youth organisation following disputes on the question of international structures and statutes, the main focus of the group and the concept of building a worker party. The majority of Revo, which supported a more pragmatic approach, centralist constitution and the slogan of the 5th international, elected appropriate candidates for the international delegate conference 2006 in Prague and continues their partnership with the LFI. At the conference, it was decided to cancel the section-status of the Australians (due to small membership), evaluating the past work and to prepare for the next tasks (local groups, G8 mobilisation).

A minority of the Revo members, who preferred a focus on the Revolution magazine, called for a federal constitution and a repeal of the links to the LFI, disregarded the outcome of the conference. A week after that conference, the minority formed its own tendency called Independent Revolution or iRevo. After iRevo refused an offer in autumn 2006 of Revolution International Council to remain in the organisation, participate in the coordination (Revolution International Council), accept the democratic decision of the rank-and-file and delegate conference, this tendency was expelled by Revo as a part of the organisation. The former iRevo-Tendency itself split in 2009.

Revo continues to build an youth organisation in Britain, Sweden, Austria and Germany and added sections in USA, Sri Lanka, Nepal and Pakistan as well as projects of forming a left alternative party with the LFI and other supporters as the WASG in Germany, New Anticapitalist Party in France, the left-list in Austria or the 5th International itself.

In 2012, former Revo member Luke Cooper won libel damages of £60,000 after the Daily Mail and Evening Standard falsely claimed that he was a ringleader in planning violent disorder at the occupation of the Conservative Party's headquarters at Millbank during the 2010 UK student protests.
