= International Socialist Left =

The International Socialist Left (German: internationale sozialistische linke, isl) was a Trotskyist group in Germany. The isl was an organizational descendant of the International Marxist Group (GIM). It was one of two factions that form the German section of the Fourth International was affiliated with the Association for Solidarity Perspectives (VsP).

Along with co-producing the VsP's newspaper Sozialistische Zeitung, the isl worked with the Revolutionary Socialist League (the other part of the German section) and groups in Austria and Switzerland to produce Inprekorr, the German-language magazine of the Fourth International.

In December 2016, the ISL and the RSB announced that they had merged to form the new International Socialist Organisation.
