= International Socialist Organisation (Germany) =

The International Socialist Organisation (German: Internationale Sozialistische Organisation, ISO) is a Trotskyist group in Germany. It was established on 11 December 2016 by the merger of the organizations International Socialist Left and the Revolutionary Socialist League. The group forms the section of the Fourth International in Germany. Members of the ISO work in the broad-based democratic socialist party Die Linke, and publish Sozialistische Zeitung.
