= El Comunista (Antofagasta) =

- Type: Daily
- Founder: Luis Emilio Recabarren
- Editor: José Vega Diaz
- Founded: 1916
- Ceased publication: 1926
- Political alignment: Communist
- Language: Spanish
- Headquarters: Antofagasta

El Comunista ('The Communist') was a daily newspaper published from Antofagasta, Chile. The publication was founded by Luis Emilio Recabarren. It was published between 1916 and 1927. The newspaper was known as El Socialista ('The Socialist') until 1922. The name change followed the transformation of the Socialist Workers Party into the Communist Party of Chile. José Vega Diaz served as typographer, editor and director of El Socialista. As of 1926 Pedro Caballero was the director of El Comunista.

For a period El Comunista was the largest newspaper in Antofagasta, with a circulation superior to all other newspapers in the city combined. The newspaper supported the Federación Obrera de Chile.
