= Socialist Convergence (Mexico) =

Trotskyist organization in Mexico

Socialist Convergence (Spanish: Convergencia Socialista, CS) was a Trotskyist organization in Mexico.

It was founded in 1996 by the group formerly known as the Workers' Revolutionary Party, or PRT. It used to be a sympathizing organization of the reunified Fourth International. The CS's goal was to reestablish itself as a recognized national party, and in early 2004 it became a founding member of an electoral alliance called the Socialist Alliance, but the CS dissolved in 2009.

It used to be registered as a National political association, meaning that it was able to gather signatures from at least 5,000 supporters, and it wanted to move towards formal registration as a political party, but it wasn't able to reach its goal. At the core of the organisation was a group of around 300 members.
