= Association for Solidarity Perspectives =

German political organisation

The Association for Solidarity Perspectives (German: Verein für solidarische Perspektiven, VsP) was a far-left political organization in Germany.

The VsP was formed in October 1986 in West Germany as the United Socialist Party ('Vereinigte Sozialistische Partei', VSP), a ~600 member merger of the Trotskyist International Marxist Group (GIM) and the anti-revisionist Communist Party of Germany/Marxists–Leninists.

The parties combined their newspapers, Was Tun (What to do) and Roter Morgen (Red Dawn) respectively, to launch the Sozialistische Zeitung (Socialist Newspaper, SoZ).

The newly founded party negotiated for over 2 years with the League of West German Communists ('Bund Westdeutscher Kommunisten') about another amalgamation, but this efforts remained fruitless because of their differences over feminism.

The VSP attacked German reunification and was engaged in the fleeting left-wing resistance movement Nie wieder Deutschland ('Never again, Germany!').

When the former ruling party of the German Democratic Republic, the Socialist Unity Party (SED), reconstituted itself as the Party of Democratic Socialism (PDS) after German reunification, individual members of the VSP entered the party and obtained official positions. However, the VSP remained independent of the PDS.

In 1994, the VSP changed its name and organisational form to Association for Solidarity Perspectives (Verein für solidarische Perspektiven, VsP). One faction of the Trotskyist current in the VsP departed in 1994 and formed the Revolutionary Socialist League (RSB). The Trotskyists who remained in the VsP formed a caucus called the International Socialist Left (ISL).

In the 2005 federal elections, the VsP supported Die Linke, the descendant of the PDS.
