= Communist Party of Germany/Marxists–Leninists =

Political party in Germany (1968–1986)

Communist Party of Germany/Marxists–Leninists Kommunistische Partei Deutschlands/Marxisten-Leninisten
- Abbreviation: KPD/ML
- Chairman: Ernst Aust (until 1983); Horst-Dieter Koch (from 1983)
- Founded: 31 December 1968
- Dissolved: 1986
- Merged into: United Socialist Party
- Headquarters: Hamburg (until 1973); Dortmund (from 1973)
- Membership (mid-1970s): c. 800
- Ideology: Communism; Marxism–Leninism; Anti-revisionism; Stalinism; Maoism (until 1978); Hoxhaism (from 1978)
- Political position: Far-left

Party flag

The Communist Party of Germany/Marxists–Leninists (German: Kommunistische Partei Deutschlands/Marxisten-Leninisten, KPD/ML) was an anti-revisionist communist party based in West Germany. It was founded in 1968 by former Communist Party of Germany (KPD) official Ernst Aust, who subsequently became the party's first chairman. The party also had a clandestine cell in East Germany from 1976 to 1986. The KPD/M upheld the legacy of Soviet premier Joseph Stalin, and supported China under Mao Zedong and later Albania under Enver Hoxha after the Sino-Albanian split. At its peak in the mid-1970s, the party claimed a membership of around 800.

The party published a periodical named Roter Morgen (transl. "Red Morning"). Former members of the party continued to publish the newspaper until December 2011.

== History ==
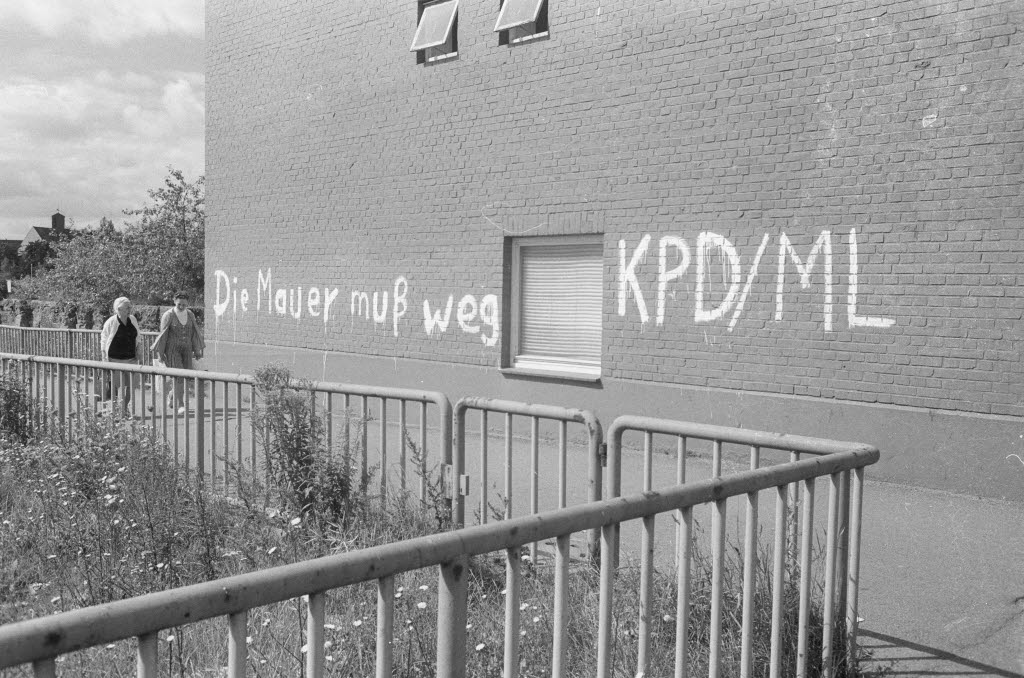
KPD/ML graffiti, August 1974. The text reads: Die Mauer muß weg ("The Wall must go") KPD/ML.

The KPD/ML was founded on 31 December 1968 in Hamburg, West Germany, and was centered around the leadership of Ernst Aust. Rival organisations who were similarly named distinguished themselves by calling the KPD/ML the "Roter Morgen Group", after the party's newspaper Roter Morgen. The party's headquarters were moved from Hamburg to Dortmund in 1973.

The KPD/ML opposed the German Communist Party (DKP), which it believed to be revisionist, and initially oriented itself around Maoism. Aust made his first international trip in 1974, travelling to Albania to meet Enver Hoxha in a private audience. Yao Wenyuan, a member of the Central Committee of the Chinese Communist Party later received Aust on 1 June 1975. At its fourth congress in 1978, the KPD/ML adopted a new programme and disassociated itself entirely from the Chinese Communist Party, rejecting Mao's Three Worlds Theory in particular. Relations between the KPD/ML and the Party of Labour of Albania had cooled significantly by 1984.

Owing to his failing health, Aust resigned as chairman in 1983. Horst-Dieter Koch was elected as the party's new chairman at the conclusion of the fifth party congress on 6 November 1983.

In 1986, the KPD/ML merged with the Trotskyist-oriented International Marxist Group to form the Unified Socialist Party. A handful of members who opposed the merge split off and formed many parties in the tradition of Aust's KPD/ML, the most prominent being the Communist International (Stalinist-Hoxhaists), the Organization for the Construction of a Communist Workers' Party, and the Communist Party of Germany (Roter Morgen).

=== In East Germany ===
At the end of 1975 and beginning of 1976, the foundation by the KPD/ML of its own section in the East Germany was made public. The corresponding declaration was published in Roter Morgen on 7 February 1976. While the KPD/ML had already been formed in 1968 in West Germany, the nucleus of the East German section emerged within East Germany itself.

In the beginning of the 1970s, some students in the eleventh and twelfth grades at an Extended Secondary School (Erweiterte Oberschule) in East Berlin got together to study the texts of the classical authors of Marxism–Leninism independently of the official version propagated by the Socialist Unity Party of Germany (SED). Other interested people among their friends and families joined them, so that, in the course of time, a little circle of employees (in the education and technical fields) and students (of medicine, language and literature) was formed. In reading the basic texts of Marxist–Leninist social theory they came more and more to the conclusion that a deep gap existed between theory and practice in "actually existing socialism".

In Magdeburg, in 1969 and 1970, pupils, students and apprentices got together to form the Progressive Youth (Progressive Jugend), inspired by, among others, the Black Panthers. Besides the classical authors of Marxism–Leninism, various forbidden texts (of Mao, Stalin, the Black Panthers, etc.) were read and discussed by this youth group, whose activities spanned across East Germany and which was composed of around 100 young people. Following the dissolution of the Progressive Youth by the East German authorities, the "hardcore" elements of the Progressive Youth formed a KPD/ML cell in 1976.

In Rostock, too, an autonomous circle of students was formed with a similar political orientation. Being interested in further ideological inspiration, many of these groups and circles – by themselves – got in touch with various left organizations in West Berlin and with the Albanian embassy in East Berlin.

Besides the youth, who were the majority within the East German section, some older, battle-hardened comrades joined the section. For instance, Heinz Reiche, who had spent 11 years in Nazi prisons and concentration camps, took part in activities in Weißwasser (a township south of Cottbus). Reiche had already come into conflict with the SED in the 1950s.

During the following years, the KPD/ML was successful in gaining supporters and organizing them into party cells in East Germany. These cells were inspired by the cell system of the illegal KPD during the Nazi dictatorship. According to declassified Stasi files, almost a dozen such cells were formed by 1980. The total number of members or supporters of the KPD/ML in East Germany amounted to three dozen people. In addition, there were about 50 to 60 sympathizers who were in direct personal contact with the above-mentioned circle.

== Party congresses ==
#	Date(s)	Notes
–	31 December 1968	Founding congress
I	December 1971	
II	July 1972	
III	February 1977	
IV	16–18 December 1978	Held in Hamburg
V	4–6 November 1983	Horst-Dieter Koch replaced Ernst Aust as chairman.
VI	27–29 December 1985	Held in Stuttgart

== Election results ==
Year	Election	Votes	%	Notes
1974	Hamburg Parliament	3,001	0.3	
1975	North Rhine-Westphalia Landtag	1,731	0.0	
1978	Hamburg Parliament	880	0.1	
1980	Bundestag	9,319	0.0	As the People's Front Against Reaction, Fascism and War
1982	Hamburg Parliament	716	0.1	Open list including League of West German Communists members
1983	Bundestag	3,431	0.0	Open list including League of West German Communists members
1985	North Rhine-Westphalia Landtag	434	0.0	

== Gallery ==
Roter Morgen front pages
Roter Morgen issue announcing the formation of the Communist Party of Germany/Marxist–Leninist in West Germany

Roter Morgen issue announcing the formation of the East German branch of the Communist Party of Germany/Marxist–Leninist

An advertisement for Roter Morgen. The German text in bold reads: "Forbidden in the GDR, confiscated in the West".

== See also ==
- List of anti-revisionist groups
