= Socialist Unity League (Mexico) =

Trotskyist group in Mexico

The Socialist Unity League (Spanish: Liga de Unidad Socialista, LUS) is a small Trotskyist group in Mexico. It was formed in 1996 and is close to the US group Socialist Action and the German Revolutionary Socialist League. It is a member of the Socialist Alliance.
