= Ernst Aust =

German communist (1923–1985)

- Born: April 12, 1923; Eimsbüttel, Hamburg, Germany
- Died: August 25, 1985 (aged 62); Müden, Lower Saxony, West Germany
- Occupations: Political activist, journalist
- Political party: Communist Party of Germany/Marxists–Leninists

Ernst Aust (12 April 1923 – 25 August 1985) was a German communist political activist and journalist. He was the founder of the Communist Party of Germany/Marxist–Leninists (KPD/ML).

== Biography ==
Aust was born into a working-class family. During the Second World War, he was taken prisoner by the British. There he met German communists and began studying Marxist works. Aust became a member of the Communist Party of Germany and the Cultural Association for the Democratic Renewal of Germany. From 1951 he worked as an editor of the Hamburger Volkszeitung.

In 1953, Aust took over the coastal magazine Blinkfüer, which emerged from the Movement for the Liberation of Heligoland, on behalf of the party. Aust was a staunch opponent of de-Stalinization and sided with the People's Republic of China during the Sino-Soviet split. In June 1967, Aust began publishing the newspaper Roter Morgen.

On 31 December 1968, Aust founded the Communist Party of Germany/Marxist–Leninists (KPD/ML) in Hamburg – one of the first K-Gruppens in Germany. After the extraordinary party conference at the end of 1971, the party elected him as its chairman.

The party later split several times. As early as 1970, Aust fell out with Willi Dickhut, the editor of the theoretical organ Revolutionärer Weg. Dickhut later became the founder of the Communist Workers' Association of Germany (KABD), a merger of the KPD/ML (Revolutionary Way) and the Communist Workers' Association/Marxist–Leninists (KAB/ML), the latter from which today's Marxist–Leninist Party of Germany later emerged. While Dickhut remained a Maoist even after the death of Mao Zedong, Aust followed the course of the Albanian communists under Enver Hoxha after 1978.
