= Teresa Flores =

Chilean trade unionist (1890–1952)

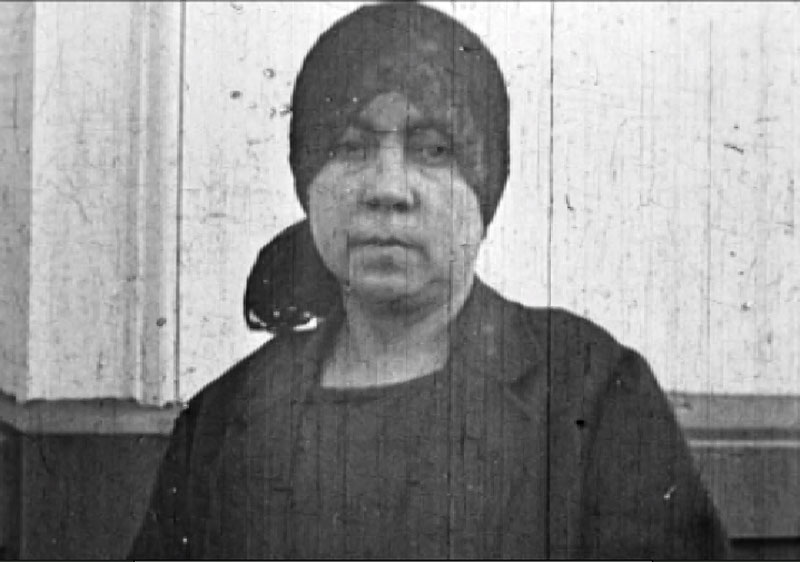
- Born: January 4, 1890; Iquique, Chile
- Died: October 5, 1952 (aged 62); Santiago, Chile
- Other names: Compañerita
- Occupations: Labor leader and feminist activist

Teresa Flores (January 4, 1890 – October 5, 1952), known as Compañerita, was a Chilean labor leader, feminist, and founding member of the Chilean Socialist Workers' Party.

== Biography ==
Teresa Flores was born in Iquique, Chile, in 1890. Her mother, María Flores y López, was a seamstress; her father's identity was not recorded.

In 1912, Flores was the only woman among the founders of the Socialist Workers' Party in Iquique.

She became associated with the prominent Spanish anticlerical and anarchist activist Belén de Sárraga, who visited Chile in 1913. After Sárraga's departure, the Belén de Sárraga Anticlerical and Free Thought Center was established in Iquique, following one created in Antofagasta, and Flores invited women of all ages to join. She served as secretary and later president of the center. Expanding throughout the saltpeter mining communities and to cities like Valparaíso, the Sárraga centers focused on anti-alcohol activism, promoting modern ideas in youth education, and anticlericalism. At their first conference on May 17, 1913, held at the offices of the newspaper El Despertar, they proposed creating a Women's Federal Council within the Federación Obrera de Chile (FOCH), which was realized a few years later.

Flores and other women set up housewives' committees at the mining camps, organizing a kitchen strike to protest food shortages, the presence of weevils, contaminated flour, and other grievances. The women refused to cook, forcing the men to support them in their demands. If anyone attempted to light the stoves, the strikers would put them out by throwing water down the chimneys.

In 1922, Flores became the first woman to join the Federal Executive Council, the highest tier of leadership of the FOCH.

From 1912 (perhaps earlier) until his death in 1924, Flores was partners with the Chilean labor leader Luis Emilio Recabarren. After being widowed, she was featured in the 1924 film "Los funerales de Recabarren." Around 1932, she lived in Maipú with her partner Tomás Conelli, a communist leader and longtime collaborator of Recabarren's.

Flores died in Santiago in 1952. Today, she is recognized by feminist groups who celebrate her as one of the country's first female labor leaders.
