= Current for Permanent Revolution – Fourth International =

International alliance of Trotskyist political organizations

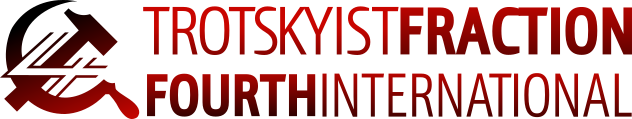
- English logo of Current for Permanent Revolution – Fourth International

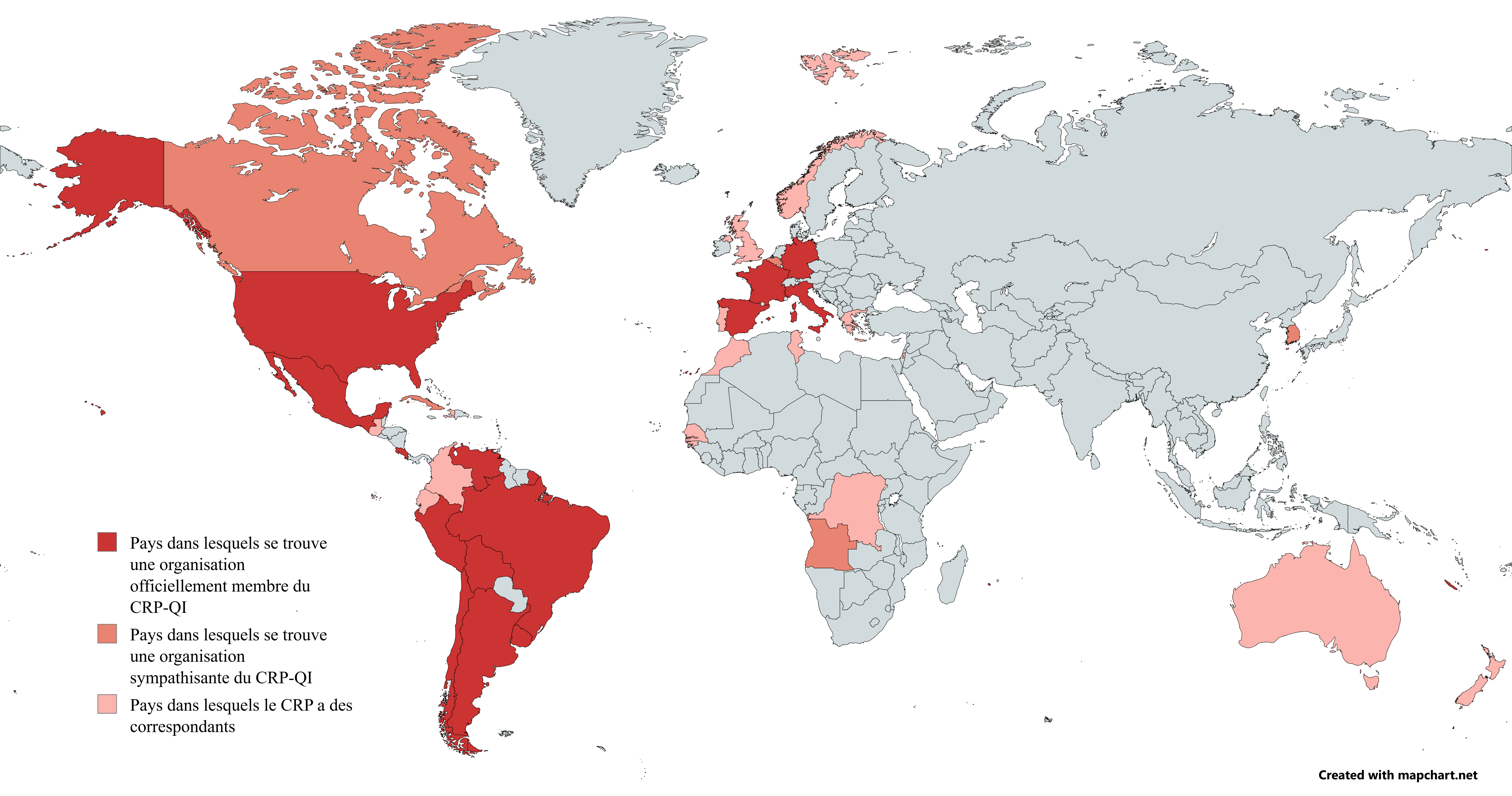
- Map of countries that have a member organization in the CPR-FI
- Abbreviation: CPR-FI
- Formation: 1989; 37 years ago
- Type: INGO
- Region served: Worldwide
- Members: 14 sections
- Official language: Spanish, Portuguese, English, French, German, Italian, Catalan
- Website: Trotskyist Fraction
- Formerly called: Internationalist Faction of the IWL-FI (1989-1995); Internationalist Fraction (1995-1996); Trotskyist Fraction – International Strategy (1996-2004); Trotskyist Fraction – Fourth International (2004-2025)

The Current for Permanent Revolution – Fourth International (CPR-FI) is a political international of Trotskyist political organizations that claim to adhere to the political legacy of the Fourth International. Formerly known as the Trotskyist Fraction – Fourth International, it was renamed after its XIV international conference held in São Paulo in December 2025.

== History ==
It has its origin in the expelled Internationalist Bolshevik Faction of the Movement for Socialism (MAS). MAS was the Argentine section of the International Workers League (IWL-FI). The Internationalist Bolshevik Faction regarded itself initially as an "external fraction" of the MAS/IWL-FI who had been wrongly expelled, and demanded the overturning of its expulsion.

The Internationalist Bolshevik Faction became the Socialist Workers' Party (PTS) in 1988. In 1989 the Partido Obrero Socialista (POS) in Mexico, later renamed Liga de Trabajadores Socialistas (LTS), was also expelled from the IWL-FI. The PTS and the POS founded the Internationalist Faction of the IWL-FI (IFIWL-FI) in 1989. The Liga Obrera Trotskista in Chile (later renamed Clase contra Clase), which was expelled from the IWL-FI in 1988, joined the IFIWL-FI in 1990.

From 1988 to 1990 the PTS had three splits: first when a number of militants returned to the Argentinian Movement for Socialism (MAS) party, then when another group of militants sympathized with the British Workers Revolutionary Party (Worker Press) and the third when supporters of León Pérez (former member of the International Secretariat of the IWL-FI) decided to follow a mass party perspective (as opposed to a vanguard party).

These splits forced the PTS to make a balance and self-criticism. This resulted in a further development. The PTS and the IFIWL-FI questioned the "update" of the Transitional Program that Nahuel Moreno, the leader of the IWL-FI, had made (his so-called theory of "Democratic Revolution"). The PTS and the IFIWL-FI regarded Moreno's update as an "anti-Trotskyist revision" of Leon Trotsky's Theory of Permanent Revolution. The PTS and the IFIWL-FI broke with Moreno's political tradition/heritage, ideology (termed Morenoism) and tendency (the IWL-FI). The IFIWL-FI was renamed Internationalist Faction.

In 1996 the Trotskyist Fraction - International Strategy (TF - IS) was founded. It admitted the Estratégia Revolucionaria (later renamed Liga Estratégia Revolucionaria - Quarta Internacional), yet another split of the IWL-FI, as its Brazilian section in 1998. The La Liga Obrera Revolucionaria por la Cuarta Internacional (LOR-CI), a split of the Revolutionary Workers' Party (Bolivia), joined the TF-IS in 1999.

By 2004 it consisted of the PTS of Argentina, the LTS of Mexico (current name MTS), the LOR-CI of Bolivia, the Liga Estratégia Revolucionaria - Quarta Internacional, current name Movimento Revolucionário de Trabalhadores (MRT), of Brazil and the Clase contra Clase, current name Partido de Trabajadores Revolucionarios (PTR), of Chile as well as some militant sympathizers in Europe. In 2004, in its second international conference, the Trotskyist Fraction - International Strategy decided to change its name to Trotskyist Fraction – Fourth International (TF-FI). Following the economic crisis and demonstrations in several countries, the TF-FI grew in Latin America and Europe, and its manifesto of 2013 called for the formation of a new grouping: An International Movement for a Socialist Revolution – Fourth International. The manifesto was updated in 2021, due to new developments in the international arena.

In 2005 the TF-FI admitted the Clase Contra Clase (current name Corriente Revolucionaria de Trabajadores y Trabajadoras (CRT)), a split of the International Marxist Tendency, as its Spanish section. In addition, the Juventud de Izquierda Revolucionaria from Venezuela, current name Liga de Trabajadores por el Socialismo(LTS), also became a TF-FI section.

== National sections ==
The largest full section of CPR-FI is the PTS in Argentina. After the 2023 Argentine general election the PTS has four national deputies in the National Congress of Argentina: Nicolás del Caño, Christian Castillo, Myriam Bregman, and Alejandro Vilca.

The Organización Socialista Revolucionaria (Costa Rica), the Frazione Internazionalista Rivoluzionaria (Italy), and the Corriente Socialista de las y los Trabajadores (Peru) became full sections of CPR-FI after endorsing the CPR-FI manifesto of 2013.

In 2022 the Révolution Permanente in France became a full section of CPR-FI. Le Journal du Dimanche noted the rising domination of the Révolution Permanente and its youth group, the Le Poing Levé, during the strikes against the French pension reform of 2023. Le Monde remarked that the Révolution Permanente's "media visibility" was "disproportionate" to its size during the 2023 protests. According to Arrêt sur images the website of the Révolution Permanente has become indispensable to striking workers. According to La Croix, Adèle Haenel, Assa Traoré and Frédéric Lordon are supporters of the organization.

Full sections		Websites
Argentina	Socialist Workers' Party (Partido de los Trabajadores Socialistas) (PTS)	https://pts.org.ar/ https://www.laizquierdadiario.com/
Bolivia	Revolutionary Workers League for the Fourth International (Liga Obrera Revolucionaria por la Cuarta Internacional) (LOR-CI)	https://lorci.org https://www.laizquierdadiario.com.bo/Bolivia
Brazil	Revolutionary Workers' Movement (Movimento Revolucionário de Trabalhadores) (MRT)	https://www.esquerdadiario.com.br/
Chile	Revolutionary Workers Party (Partido de Trabajadores Revolucionarios) (PTR)	https://www.laizquierdadiario.cl/Chile
France	Révolution Permanente (Révolution Permanente) (RP)	https://www.revolutionpermanente.fr/
Germany	Revolutionary Internationalist Organisation (Revolutionäre Internationalistische Organisation) (RIO)	https://www.klassegegenklasse.org/
Mexico	Socialist Workers' Movement (Movimiento de los Trabajadores Socialistas) (MTS)	https://www.laizquierdadiario.mx/Mexico
Spain	Workers' Revolutionary Current (Corriente Revolucionaria de Trabajadores y Trabajadoras) (CRT)	https://crtweb.org/ https://www.izquierdadiario.es/ES https://www.esquerradiari.cat/
Uruguay	Current of Workers for Socialism (Corriente de Trabajadores por el Socialismo) (CTS)	https://www.laizquierdadiario.com.uy/Uruguay
USA	Left Voice (LV)	https://www.leftvoice.org/
Venezuela	League of Workers for Socialism (Liga de Trabajadores por el Socialismo) (LTS)	https://www.laizquierdadiario.com.ve/Venezuela
Costa Rica	Revolutionary Socialist Organization (Organización Socialista Revolucionaria) (OSR)	https://www.laizquierdadiario.cr/CR
Italy	Revolutionary Internationalist Fraction (Frazione Internazionalista Rivoluzionaria) (FIR)	https://www.lavocedellelotte.it/
Peru	Workers' Socialist Current (Corriente Socialista de las y los Trabajadores) (CST)	https://www.laizquierdadiario.pe/Peru
Fraternal sections		Websites
South Korea	March to Socialism	https://socialism.jinbo.net/
Belgium	Rouge!	https://rouge-rood.be/
Canada	What Is To Be Done?	https://whatistobedone.ca/

Former sections:

- France Groupe Communiste Revolutionaire Internationaliste (Revolutionary Internationalist Communist Group) (CRI) - They were admitted in 2008 as sympathiser section of CPR-FI, but after the creation of the New Anticapitalist Party (NPA) they decided to dissolve within the CLAIRE Tendency of the NPA (acronym for "Tendency for Communism and self-organized, internationalist and revolutionary struggle").
- Costa Rica Socialist Revolution League (Liga de la Revolución Socialista) (LRS) - Admitted in 2008 as full section, but they dissolved in 2014.

== See also ==
- List of Trotskyist internationals
