= International Marxist Group (Germany) =

Political organization in Germany

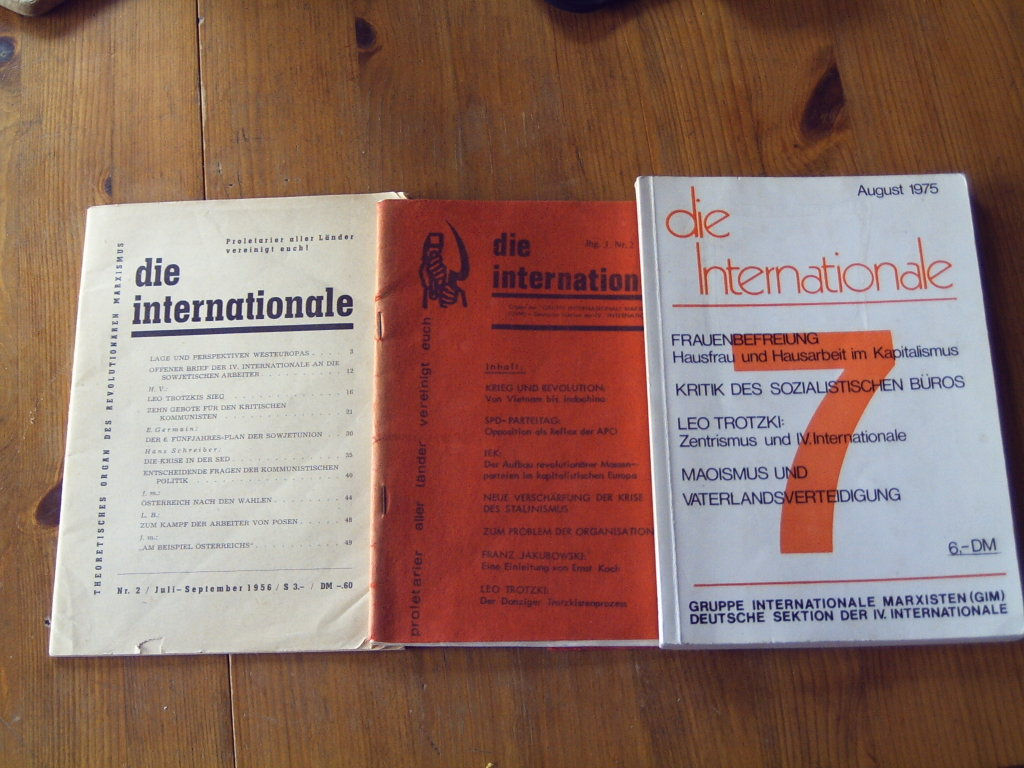
Three copies of the journal Die Internationale.

The International Marxist Group (German: Gruppe Internationale Marxisten, GIM) was the name of two German Marxist groups. The first was formed in 1939, as a breakaway from the Communist Party Opposition (KPO), and was linked to the centrist Marxist International Workers Front.

The second was a Trotskyist group in West Germany, formed in 1968 by the International Communists of Germany (IKD) and a faction of the Socialist German Student League (SDS). The GIM served as the German section of the reunified Fourth International. In the 1950s, the IKD had entered the Independent Workers' Party (UAP) and later the Social Democratic Party (SPD). The group was involved in the Extraparliamentary Opposition (APO) movement through the early 1970s. In 1986, the GIM joined with the Communist Party of Germany/Marxists-Leninists to form the Unified Socialist Party (VSP). The VSP changed its name to the Association for Solidarity Perspectives (VsP) in 1993.
