= Revolutionary Socialist League (Germany) =

The Revolutionary Socialist League (German: Revolutionär Sozialistischer Bund, RSB) was a small Trotskyist group in Germany. It was formed in 1994 as a split from the Association for Solidarity Perspectives (VsP). The RSB generally considered itself to be more radical than the VsP, and unlike the VsP it is very critical of the Left Party. Along with the International Socialist Left, the RSB was one of the two factions which form the German section of the Fourth International.

It published the monthly magazine Avanti.

In December 2016, the RSB and the ISL announced that they had merged to form the new International Socialist Organisation.
