= Workers' Revolutionary Party (Mexico) =

Mexican political party founded in 1976

Workers' Revolutionary Party Partido Revolucionario de los Trabajadores
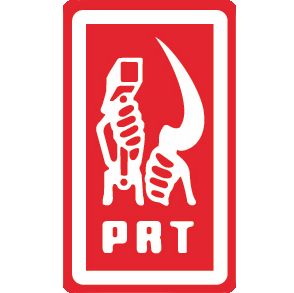
- Founded: 1976; 2009
- Dissolved: 1996
- Succeeded by: Socialist Convergence
- Ideology: Trotskyism
- Political position: Far-left

Website
- www.prt.org.mx

The Workers' Revolutionary Party (Spanish: Partido Revolucionario de los Trabajadores, PRT) is a Trotskyist political party in Mexico. It was originally founded in 1976 by the merger of two Trotskyist groups: the International Communist League, associated with the United Secretariat of the Fourth International and the Mexican Morenists.

In 1977, the Marxist Workers' League, associated with the Organising Committee for the Reconstruction of the Fourth International, joined the party. In the following years, other small groups of Trotskyists also joined the PRT, but the group associated with Moreno left in 1979 to form the Socialist Workers' Party (Partido Obrero Socialista) (POS).

From their base in the 1968 student movement, the PRT grew quickly, soon gaining bases of support among some telephone, electrical, nuclear, and hospital workers. By the 1980s, it was the largest far-left party to challenge the ruling Institutional Revolutionary Party (PRI). In 1981, the federal government recognized the PRT as an official nationwide party. In the 1982 general elections, it was also the first Mexican party to raise gay rights as a campaign issue and fielded several openly gay candidates for the Chamber of Deputies. It also entered informal alliances with the other main party on the far left, the United Socialist Party of Mexico (PSUM). However, it did not elect any deputies to Congress. In the next national election in 1985, the PRT elected six federal deputies to the LIII Legislature via proportional representation. At the state level, Isidro Leyva Leyva became the first and only PRT member to be serve in the Congress of Sonora.

During the latter half of the 1980s, the PRT began to face a series of crises and in-fighting as its progress slowed. It has been alleged that the ruling PRI sent agents into the PRT to disrupt its activities. In 1987, the PRT refused to join the merger of five parties/organizations which became the Mexican Socialist Party (PMS). During the 1988 presidential election, the PRT lost ground as an electoral party because of the campaign of leftist Cuauhtémoc Cárdenas, who soon formed the Party of the Democratic Revolution (PRD).

In 1996, after losing federal recognition, what remained of the PRT (led by Edgard Sánchez Ramírez) formed Socialist Convergence. The party was revived in 2009.
