= List of social democratic parties =

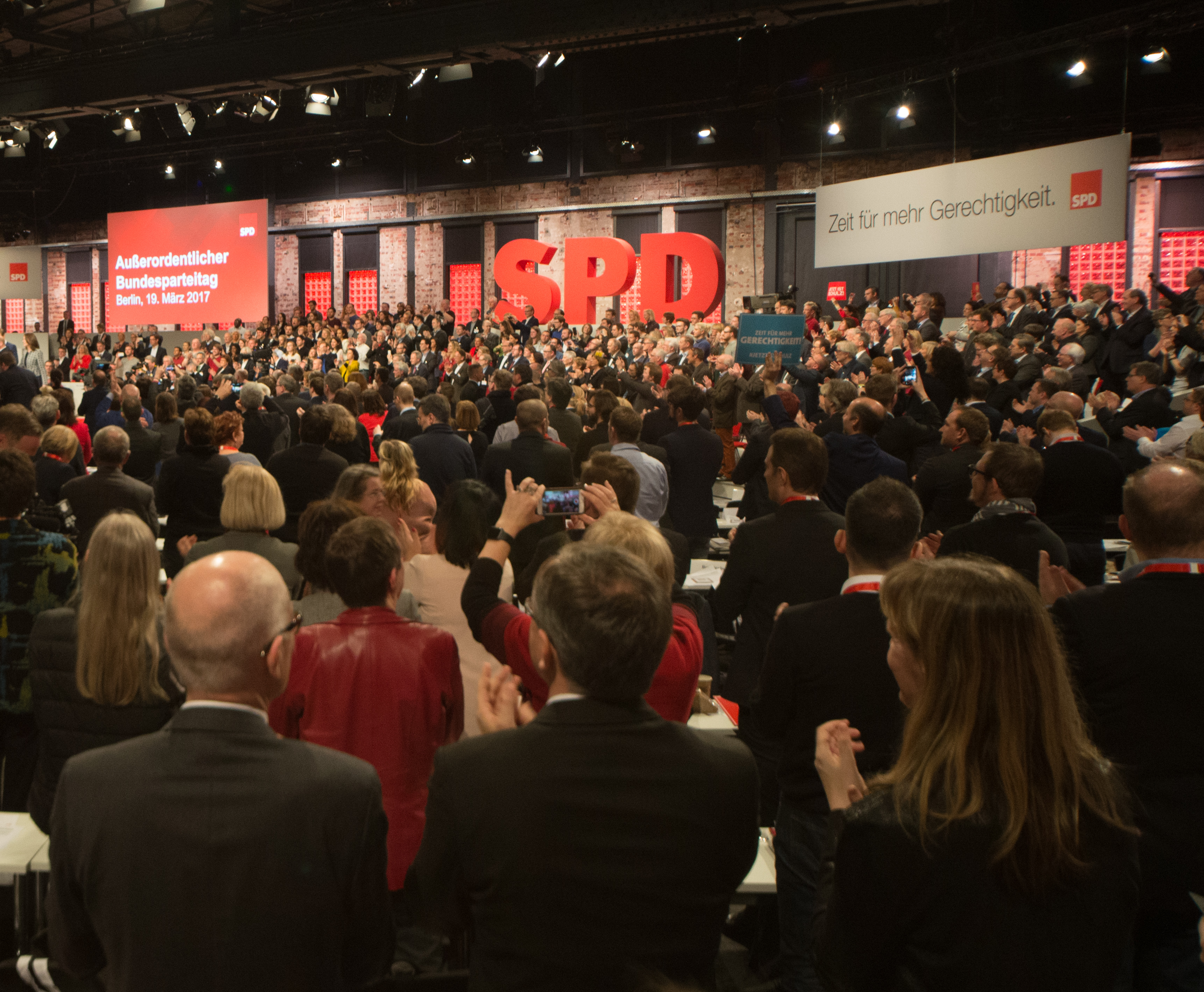
2017 party conference of the Social Democratic Party of Germany

This is a list of parties in the world that consider themselves to be upholding the principles and values of social democracy. Some of the parties are also members of the Socialist International, Party of European Socialists or the Progressive Alliance.

== Names used by social democratic parties ==
- Socialist Party
- Social Democratic Party
- Democratic Socialist Party
- Socialist Democratic Party
- Labour Party
- Social Democratic Union
- New Democratic Party
- Democratic Party

== Alphabetical list by country ==
=== A ===
- Albania:
  - Socialist Party of Albania
  - Socialist Movement for Integration
  - Social Democratic Party of Albania
- Åland Islands (Finland):
  - Åland Social Democrats
- Algeria:
  - Front of Socialist Forces
- Andorra:
  - Social Democratic Party
  - Social Democracy and Progress
- Angola:
  - People's Movement for the Liberation of Angola (MPLA)
- Argentina:
  - Frente de Todos
    - Broad Front
    - National Alfonsinist Movement
    - Victory Party
    - Protector Political Force
    - Labor and Equity Party
  - Socialist Party
  - Generation for a National Encounter
- Armenia:
  - Social Democrat Hunchakian Party
  - Citizen's Decision
- Aruba:
  - People's Electoral Movement
  - RAIZ
  - Aruban Sovereignty Movement
- Australia:
  - Australian Labor Party
- Austria:
  - Social Democratic Party of Austria (SPÖ)

=== B ===
- Barbados:
  - Democratic Labour Party
  - Barbados Labour Party
  - People's Party for Democracy and Development
  - Friends of Democracy
  - United Progressive Party (Barbados)
- Belarus:
  - Belarusian Social Democratic Assembly
  - Belarusian Social Democratic Party (Assembly)
  - Belarusian Social Democratic Party (People's Assembly)
- Belgium:
  - Socialist Party (PS)
  - Forward
- Belize:
  - Belize People's Front
  - Belize Progressive Party
- Benin:
  - Social Democratic Party
- Bosnia and Herzegovina:
  - Social Democratic Party of Bosnia and Herzegovina
  - Social Democrats
- Botswana:
  - Umbrella for Democratic Change:
    - Botswana Congress Party
    - Botswana National Front
- Brazil:
  - Democratic Labour Party
  - Workers' Party
  - Brazilian Socialist Party
  - Sustainability Network
  - Party of National Mobilization
  - Solidarity
- Bulgaria:
  - BSP for Bulgaria:
    - Bulgarian Socialist Party
  - Party of Bulgarian Social Democrats
  - Political Movement "Social Democrats"
  - Alternative for Bulgarian Revival
  - Stand Up.BG

=== C ===
- Cameroon:
  - Social Democratic Front
- Canada:
  - New Democratic Party (NDP/NPD)
  - Green Party of Canada
  - British Columbia New Democratic Party (A British Columbian provincial party)
  - Bloc Québécois
  - Parti Québécois (A Quebec provincial party)
  - Québec solidaire (A Quebec provincial party)
- Chile:
  - Democratic Socialism:
    - Party for Democracy
    - Socialist Party of Chile
    - New Deal
  - Apruebo Dignidad:
    - Democratic Revolution
    - Unir Movement
- Colombia:
  - Colombian Liberal Party
  - Historic Pact for Colombia:
    - Alternative Democratic Pole
    - Patriotic Union
- Costa Rica:
  - National Liberation Party
  - Citizens' Action Party
- Croatia:
  - Social Democratic Party of Croatia
  - Social Democrats
  - Croatian Labourists – Labour Party
  - New Left
- Cuba:
  - Democratic Social-Revolutionary Party of Cuba
  - Social Democratic Co-ordination of Cuba
  - Cuban Democratic Socialist Current
- Curaçao:
  - Partido MAN
  - Curaçao is the Best
- Cyprus:
  - Movement for Social Democracy
- Czech Republic:
  - Social Democracy
  - New Social Democracy

=== D ===
- Democratic Republic of the Congo:
  - Union for Democracy and Social Progress
- Denmark:
  - Social Democrats
- Dominican Republic:
  - Dominican Liberation Party
  - Social Democratic Institutional Bloc

=== E ===
- Ecuador:
  - Democratic Left
  - PAIS Alliance
- Egypt
  - Egyptian Social Democratic Party
- Estonia:
  - Social Democratic Party
- Ethiopia:
  - Medrek
  - Social Democratic Party
- European Union:
  - Party of European Socialists

=== F ===
- Faroe Islands (Denmark):
  - Social Democratic Party
- Fiji:
  - Fiji Labour Party
  - National Federation Party
- Finland:
  - Social Democratic Party of Finland
  - Left Alliance
- France:
  - Socialist Party
  - Democrats and Progressives
  - Place Publique
  - La Convention
  - Eusko Alkartasuna (Basque Country)
  - Party of the Corsican Nation (Corsica)
  - United Guadeloupe, Solidary and Responsible (Guadeloupe)

=== G ===
- Georgia:
  - For the People
  - Georgian Labour Party
  - Movement for Social Democracy
  - Social Democrats for the Development of Georgia
- Germany:
  - Social Democratic Party of Germany (SPD)
- Ghana:
  - National Democratic Congress
- Gibraltar:
  - Gibraltar Socialist Labour Party
- Greece:
  - Syriza
  - Movement of Democratic Socialists
  - PASOK – Movement for Change (PASOK-KINAL)
  - Agreement for the New Greece
- Greenland (Denmark):
  - Siumut
- Guatemala:
  - Semilla
  - Will, Opportunity and Solidarity (VOS)

=== H ===
- Haiti:
  - Struggling People's Organization
  - Fusion of Haitian Social Democrats
  - Platfòm Pitit Desalin
- Hong Kong:
  - Labour Party
- Honduras:
  - Innovation and Unity Party
  - Democratic Unification Party
- Hungary:
  - Hungarian Socialist Party
  - Democratic Coalition
  - Social Democratic Party of Hungary
  - Yes Solidarity for Hungary Movement

=== I ===
- Iceland:
  - Social Democratic Alliance
- India:
  - All India Anna Dravida Munnetra Kazhagam
  - Dravida Munnetra Kazhagam
  - Marumalarchi Dravida Munnetra Kazhagam
  - Indian National Congress
  - Samajwadi Party
- Indonesia:
  - Labour Party
  - Indonesian Democratic Party of Struggle
- Iran:
  - National Front
  - Iran Party
  - Organization of Iranian People's Fedaian (Majority)
  - Democratic Party of Iranian Kurdistan (Eastern Kurdistan)
  - Komala (Eastern Kurdistan)
- Iraq:
  - Patriotic Union of Kurdistan (Kurdistan region)
  - Kurdistan Social Democratic Party (Kurdistan region)
  - Kurdistan Toilers' Party (Kurdistan region)
  - Kurdistan Laborers' Party (Kurdistan region)
  - Komala (Kurdistan region)
  - Social Democratic Current
- Ireland, Republic of:
  - Labour Party
  - Social Democrats
- Israel:
  - The Democrats
  - Shas
  - United Torah Judaism
  - Balad
- Italy:
  - Article One (Art.1)
  - Democratic Party (PD)
  - Italian Socialist Party (PSI)
  - Possible (Pos)
  - Social Democracy
  - Sicilian Socialist Party (Sicily)

=== J ===
- Jamaica:
  - People's National Party
- Japan:
  - Social Democratic Party
  - Okinawa Social Mass Party (Okinawa)

=== K ===
- Kazakhstan:
  - Nationwide Social Democratic Party
- Kosovo:
  - Social Democratic Initiative
  - Social Democratic Party of Kosovo
  - Social Democratic Union
  - Lëvizja Vetëvendosje! (Self-determination Movement)
- Kyrgyzstan:
  - Ata Meken Socialist Party
  - Social Democrats

=== L ===
- Latvia:
  - Social Democratic Party "Harmony"
  - Latvian Social Democratic Workers' Party
  - The Progressives
- Lebanon:
  - Democratic Left Movement
  - Progressive Socialist Party
- Libya:
  - Ensaf Movement
- Lithuania:
  - Social Democratic Party of Lithuania
  - Union of Democrats "For Lithuania"
  - Lithuanian Regions Party
- Luxembourg:
  - Luxembourg Socialist Workers' Party

=== M ===
- Madagascar
  - Rebirth of the Social Democratic Party
- Malaysia:
  - Democratic Action Party
- Malta:
  - Labour Party
- Mauritania:
  - Union of the Forces of Progress
  - Rally of Democratic Forces
- Mauritius:
  - Labour Party
  - Mauritian Militant Movement
  - Militant Socialist Movement
- Mexico:
  - Institutional Revolutionary Party
  - Morena
  - Citizens' Movement
  - Party of the Democratic Revolution
- Moldova:
  - European Social Democratic Party
  - Social Democratic Party
  - National Alternative Movement
  - People's Party of the Republic of Moldova
- Mongolia:
  - Mongolian People's Party
  - Right Person Electorate Coalition
    - Mongolian Social Democratic Party
- Montenegro:
  - Democratic Party of Socialists of Montenegro
  - Social Democratic Party of Montenegro
  - Social Democrats
  - Socialist People's Party of Montenegro
- Morocco:
  - Socialist Union of Popular Forces
- Myanmar:
  - Democratic Party for a New Society

=== N ===
- Namibia:
  - Landless People's Movement
- Nepal:
  - Nepali Congress
  - Loktantrik Samajwadi Party, Nepal
  - Rastriya Swatantra Party
- Netherlands:
  - Progressief Nederland
- New Zealand:
  - New Zealand Labour Party
  - Green Party of Aotearoa New Zealand
- Nicaragua:
  - Sandinista Renovation Movement
- Niger:
  - Nigerien Party for Democracy and Socialism
  - Social Democratic Rally
  - Social Democratic Party
  - Party for Socialism and Democracy in Niger
- Nigeria:
  - Young Progressives Party
  - Labour Party
  - People's Redemption Party
  - Social Democratic Party
- Northern Cyprus:
  - Republican Turkish Party
  - Communal Democracy Party
- North Korea:
  - Korean Social Democratic Party
- North Macedonia:
  - Social Democratic Union of Macedonia
  - New Social Democratic Party
- Norway:
  - Labour Party

=== P ===
- Palestine:
  - Fatah
  - Palestinian National Initiative
- Panama:
  - Democratic Revolutionary Party
- Pakistan:
  - Pakistan Peoples Party
  - Pakistan Peoples Party Workers
  - Qaumi Watan Party
  - Awami National Party
  - National Democratic Movement
  - National Party
- Paraguay:
  - National Encounter Party
  - Revolutionary Febrerista Party
  - Progressive Democratic Party
- Peru:
  - American Popular Revolutionary Alliance
  - National United Renaissance
  - Peruvian Nationalist Party
- Philippines:
  - Akbayan
  - PDP-Laban
  - Philippine Democratic Socialist Party
- Poland:
  - New Left
  - Labour Union
  - Partia Razem
  - Freedom and Equality
  - Social Democratic Party of Poland
  - Polish Left
- Portugal:
  - Socialist Party
- Puerto Rico:
  - Puerto Rican Independence Party
  - Movimiento Victoria Ciudadana

=== R ===
- Republic of the Congo:
  - Action and Renewal Movement
  - Pan-African Union for Social Democracy
  - Congolese Party of Labour
- Romania:
  - Social Democratic Party
  - Social Justice Party
  - United Social Democratic Party
- Russia:
  - A Just Russia
  - Party of Russia's Rebirth
  - Left Socialist Action
- Rwanda:
  - Social Party Imberakuri
  - Social Democratic Party

=== S ===
- San Marino:
  - Party of Socialists and Democrats
  - Socialist Party
  - Libera San Marino
  - RETE Movement
- Senegal:
  - Socialist Party
  - Alliance of the Forces of Progress
- Serbia:
  - Socialist Party of Serbia
  - Social Democratic Party of Serbia
  - Democratic Party
  - Social Democratic Party
  - Party of Freedom and Justice
  - Movement for Reversal
  - League of Social Democrats of Vojvodina
- Singapore:
  - Workers' Party of Singapore
- Sint Maarten:
  - National Alliance
  - United Democrats
- Slovakia:
  - Voice – Social Democracy
  - Direction – Social Democracy
- Slovenia:
  - Social Democrats
- Somalia:
  - Wadajir Party
  - Somali Labour Party
- South Africa:
  - African National Congress
  - Congress of the People
  - United Democratic Movement
  - Afrikan Alliance of Social Democrats
  - National Freedom Party
- South Korea:
  - Social Democratic Party
  - Justice Party
  - Labor Party
- Spain:
  - Spanish Socialist Workers' Party
  - Sumar
  - Republican Left of Catalonia (Catalonia)
  - Eusko Alkartasuna (Basque Country)
- Sri Lanka:
  - Sri Lanka Freedom Party
- Suriname:
  - National Democratic Party
  - Brotherhood and Unity in Politics
  - Surinamese Labour Party
  - National Party of Suriname
  - Progressive Reform Party
- Sweden:
  - Swedish Social Democratic Party
- Switzerland:
  - Social Democratic Party of Switzerland
- Syria:
  - Syrian Democratic People's Party

=== T ===
- Taiwan:
  - Democratic Progressive Party
  - Social Democratic Party
- Tajikistan:
  - Social Democratic Party
- Tanzania:
  - Alliance for Change and Transparency
- Thailand:
  - People's Party
- Timor-Leste:
  - National Congress for Timorese Reconstruction
  - Frenti-Mudança
  - Republican Party (Timor-Leste)
  - Timorese Social Democratic Action Center
- Turkey:
  - Republican People's Party
  - Democratic Left Party
  - Peoples' Equality and Democracy Party
- Tunisia:
  - Democratic Current
  - Democratic Forum for Labour and Liberties
  - Movement Party
  - Social Democratic Path

=== U ===
- Uganda:
  - Uganda People's Congress
- Ukraine:
  - Batkivshchyna
  - Radical Party
  - Platform for Life and Peace
  - Ukraine – Forward!
- United Kingdom:
  - Labour Party
  - Co-operative Party
  - Mec Vannin (MC) (Isle of Man)
  - Mebyon Kernow (MK) (Cornwall)
  - Social Democratic and Labour Party (SDLP) (Northern Ireland)
  - Progressive Unionist Party (PUP) (Northern Ireland)
  - Scottish National Party (SNP) (Scotland)
  - Social Democratic Party
  - Plaid Cymru (Wales)
- United States:
  - California National Party (California)
  - Democratic Socialists of America
  - Social Democrats, USA
  - Vermont Progressive Party (Vermont)
  - Working Families Party
- Uruguay:
  - Broad Front, composed of:
    - Movement of Popular Participation
    - Socialist Party of Uruguay
    - Uruguay Assembly
    - Vertiente Artiguista
    - New Space
  - Independent Party

=== V ===
- Venezuela:
  - Democratic Action
  - For Social Democracy
  - Movement for Socialism
  - A New Era
  - Progressive Advance
  - Movimiento por Venezuela

=== Z ===
- Zambia:
  - Patriotic Front
- Zimbabwe:
  - Movement for Democratic Change

== List of historical social democratic parties ==
=== A ===
- Andorra:
  - New Democracy (Andorra)
- Australia:
  - National Labor Party
- Azerbaijan:
  - Social Democratic Party

=== B ===
- Belgium:
  - Belgian Labour Party
  - Belgian Socialist Party
  - Belgian Democratic Union

=== C ===
- Canada:
  - Co-operative Commonwealth Federation
- Chile:
  - Common Force

=== E ===
- Estonia:
  - Estonian Democratic Labour Party (1989)

=== F ===
- Finland:
  - Social Democratic Union of Workers and Smallholders
- France:
  - French Section of the Workers' International
  - Republican-Socialist Party
  - Territories of Progress

=== G ===
- Germany:
  - General German Workers' Association
  - Independent Social Democratic Party of Germany
  - Social Democratic Workers' Party of Germany
- Georgia:
  - Social Democratic Party of Georgia
- Greece:
  - Democratic Left (DIMAR)
  - Party of Democratic Socialism
  - Panhellenic Socialist Movement (PASOK)
- Guatemala:
  - Party of the Guatemalan Revolution
  - Revolutionary Action Party

=== H ===
- Hong Kong:
  - League of Social Democrats

=== I ===
- Iceland:
  - Social Democratic Party (Iceland)
  - People's Alliance (Iceland)
- India:
  - Praja Rajyam Party
  - Socialist Party (India)
- Ireland:
  - Clann na Poblachta
  - Clann na Talmhan
  - National Labour Party (Ireland)
  - Democratic Left (Ireland)
- Israel:
  - Israeli Labor Party
  - Meretz
  - Mapai
  - Ahdut HaAvoda
  - Alignment
  - Rafi
  - Democratic Choice
- Italy:
  - Action Party
  - Italian Democratic Socialists
  - Italian Socialist Party
  - Italian Democratic Socialist Party
  - Democratic Party of the Left
  - Democrats of the Left
  - New Italian Socialist Party
  - Labour Democratic Party
  - Italian Reformist Socialist Party
  - United Socialist Party
  - Free and Equal

=== J ===
- Japan:
  - Democratic Socialist Party (Japan)
  - Socialist Democratic Federation (Japan)
  - Japan Socialist Party (日本社会党, Nihon Shakai-tō), also referred to as the 'Social Democratic Party of Japan', a major Japanese political party that existed from 1945 to 1996
  - Social Democratic Party (Japan, 1926) (社会民衆党, Shakai Minshū-tō), a political party that existed from 1926 to 1932
  - Social Democratic Party (Japan, 1901) (社会民主党, Shakai Minshu-tō), a political party that existed briefly in 1901

=== K ===
- Kyrgyzstan:
  - Social Democratic Party of Kyrgyzstan

=== M ===
- Mexico:
  - Laborist Party (Mexico)
  - Progressive Social Networks

=== N ===
- Netherlands:**
  - Labour Party (PvdA)
  - GroenLinks
  - Social Democratic Workers' Party (Netherlands)
  - Democratic Socialists '70
- New Zealand:
  - Social Democratic Party (New Zealand)
  - United Labour Party (New Zealand)

=== P ===
- Pakistan:
  - Sindh National Front
- Peru:
  - Decentralist Social Force Party
- Poland:
  - Social Democracy of the Republic of Poland
  - Polish Social Democratic Union
  - Democratic Left Alliance
  - Democratic-Social Movement

=== R ===
- Romania:
  - Democratic National Salvation Front
  - Democratic Party (Romania)
  - National Salvation Front (Romania)
  - Romanian Social Democratic Party (1990–2001)

=== S ===
- San Marino:
  - Party of Democrats
  - Sammarinese Socialist Party
- Slovakia:
  - Party of the Democratic Left (Slovakia)
- South Africa:
  - Labour Party (South Africa)
  - Labour Party
- Spain:
  - Social Democratic Party

=== T ===
- Trinidad and Tobago:
  - Social Democratic Labour Party of Trinidad and Tobago
- Transnistria:
  - Social Democratic Party of Transnistria

=== U ===
- Ukraine:
  - Socialist Party of Ukraine
  - Justice Party
- United Kingdom:
  - National Labour Organisation
  - National Socialist Party
- United States:
  - Socialist Party of America

=== Y ===
- Yemen:
  - Yemeni Socialist Party

=== Z ===
- Zimbabwe:
  - Movement for Democratic Change
  - Movement for Democratic Change – Tsvangirai
  - Movement for Democratic Change – Mutambara

== See also ==
- Social democracy
- Democratic socialism
- List of democratic socialist parties and organizations
- List of social democratic and democratic socialist parties that have governed
- List of social democrats
- List of democratic socialists
- Socialist International
- Progressive Alliance
