= List of democratic socialist parties and organizations =

This is a list of parties in the world that consider themselves to be upholding the principles and values of democratic socialism or include significant numbers of democratic socialist members. Some of the parties are also members of the Socialist International, Progressive International, São Paulo Forum, Party of European Left or the Progressive Alliance.

== Names commonly used by democratic socialist parties ==
- Socialist Party
- Left Party
- Democratic Socialist Party
- Socialist Democratic Party
- Labour Party
- Social Democratic Party
- Workers' Party

== Alphabetical list by country ==
=== A ===
- Albania:
  - Organizata Politike
- Angola:
  - MPLA
- Argentina:
  - Somos
  - Intransigent Party
  - Patria Grande Front
  - Socialist Party
- Armenia:
  - Armenian Revolutionary Federation
  - Social Democrat Hunchakian Party
  - Democratic Party of Armenia
  - Independent Movement for Justice and Dignity
- Australia:
  - International Socialist Alternative Australia
  - Socialist Alliance
  - Victorian Socialists (Victoria)

=== B ===
- Barbados:
  - People's Empowerment Party
  - Democratic Labour Party
  - Barbados Labour Party
- Belarus:
  - Belarusian Green Party
- Bolivia:
  - Movement for Socialism
  - Movement for Sovereignty
- Botswana:
  - Umbrella for Democratic Change:
    - Botswana People's Party
- Brazil:
  - Workers' Party
  - Democratic Labour Party
  - Party of National Mobilization
  - Socialism and Liberty Party
- Bulgaria:
  - BSP for Bulgaria:
    - Bulgarian Left
  - Bulgarian Progressive Line

=== C ===
- Canada:
  - New Democratic Party (NDP/NPD)
  - Québec solidaire (Quebec)
- Costa Rica:
  - Broad Front
- Croatia:
  - Croatian Labourists – Labour Party
  - We can!
  - Workers' Front
- Cyprus:
  - Jasmine Movement
- Czech Republic:
  - The Left

=== D ===
- Denmark:
  - Socialist People's Party
  - Red–Green Alliance

=== E ===
- Ecuador:
  - Citizen Revolution Movement
- Egypt:
  - National Progressive Unionist Party
  - Socialist Popular Alliance Party
  - Socialist Party of Egypt
- Estonia:
  - Estonian United Left Party
- European Union:
  - Party of the European Left
  - DiEM25

=== F ===
- Faroe Islands (Denmark):
  - Republic
- Finland:
  - Left Alliance
- France:
  - Génération.s
  - La France Insoumise
  - Citizen and Republican Movement
  - Eusko Alkartasuna (Basque Country)

=== G ===
- Germany:
  - The Left
- Greece:
  - Greek Left Alliance
  - Syriza
  - MeRA25
  - PASOK
- Greenland (Denmark):
  - Inuit Ataqatigiit

=== H ===
- Haiti:
  - Platfòm Pitit Desalin
- Honduras:
  - Liberty and Refoundation
- Hungary:
  - Hungarian Socialist Party
  - Yes Solidarity for Hungary Movement

=== I ===
- Iceland:
  - Left-Green Movement
  - Icelandic Socialist Party
- India:
  - Socialist Party
- Indonesia:
  - Labour Party
  - Just and Prosperous People's Party
- Iran:
  - Organization of Iranian People's Fedaian (Majority)
  - Democratic Party of Iranian Kurdistan (Eastern Kurdistan)
  - Komala (Eastern Kurdistan)
- Iraq:
  - Kurdistan Toilers' Party (Kurdistan region)
  - Komala (Kurdistan region)
- Ireland:
  - Sinn Féin
- Italy:
  - Italian Left (SI)
  - Power to the People (PaP)

=== J ===
- Japan:
  - Japanese Communist Party
  - Social Democratic Party
  - New Socialist Party

=== L ===
- Latvia:
  - Latvian Social Democratic Workers' Party
- Luxembourg:
  - The Left

=== M ===
- Malaysia:
  - Malaysian People's Party
  - Socialist Party of Malaysia
- Mauritius:
  - Labour Party
  - Mauritian Militant Movement
  - Muvman Liberater
  - Militant Socialist Movement
- Mexico:
  - National Regeneration Movement
  - Labor Party
- Moldova:
  - Collective Action Party – Civic Congress
- Morocco:
  - Party of Progress and Socialism
  - Unified Socialist Party
  - Front of Democratic Forces
- Mozambique:
  - FRELIMO

=== N ===
- Namibia:
  - Landless People's Movement
- Nepal:
  - People's Socialist Party
- Netherlands:
  - Socialist Party
  - BIJ1
- Nigeria:
  - Young Progressives Party
  - Social Democratic Party
- Northern Cyprus:
  - New Cyprus Party
  - United Cyprus Party
- North Macedonia:
  - The Left
- Norway:
  - Socialist Left Party
  - Red Party

=== P ===
- Palestine:
  - Palestinian National Initiative
  - Palestinian Democratic Union
- Pakistan:
  - Pakistan Peoples Party (Shaheed Bhutto)
  - Awami National Party
  - Awami Workers Party
- Paraguay:
  - Revolutionary Febrerista Party
  - Progressive Democratic Party
- Peru:
  - New Peru
  - Broad Front
  - Magisterial Bloc
- Philippines:
  - Akbayan
  - Laban ng Masa
  - Philippine Democratic Socialist Party
- Poland:
  - Labour Union
  - Partia Razem
  - Polish Socialist Party
  - Freedom and Equality
  - Polish Left
- Portugal:
  - Left Bloc
  - LIVRE

=== R ===
- Romania:
  - Democracy and Solidarity Party
- Russia:
  - Party of Russia's Rebirth
  - For a New Socialism
  - Left Socialist Action
- Rwanda:
  - Rwandan Socialist Party

=== S ===
- San Marino:
  - Libera San Marino
- Serbia:
  - Party of the Radical Left
- Singapore:
  - Workers' Party of Singapore
  - Democratic Progressive Party
- Slovakia:
  - Socialisti.sk
- Slovenia:
  - The Left
- South Korea:
  - Labor Party
- Spain:
  - Podemos
  - Popular Unity Candidacy (Catalonia)
  - Coalició Compromís (Valencia)
  - Galician Nationalist Bloc (Galicia)
  - Chunta Aragonesista (Aragon)
  - Més per Mallorca (Mallorca/Majorca)
  - Socialist Party of Majorca (Mallorca/Majorca)
- Suriname:
  - National Democratic Party
  - Surinamese Labour Party
- Sweden:
  - Left Party
- Switzerland:
  - Social Democratic Party of Switzerland
  - Swiss Party of Labour
- Syria:
  - Democratic Arab Socialist Union
  - Syrian Democratic People's Party

=== T ===
- Taiwan:
  - People's Democratic Party
- Tanzania:
  - Alliance for Change and Transparency
- Timor-Leste:
  - Fretilin
- Tunisia:
  - Movement of Socialist Democrats

=== U ===
- Uganda:
  - Uganda People's Congress
- United Kingdom:
  - Labour Party
  - Left Unity (LU)
  - Socialist Labour Party (SLP)
  - Northern Independence Party (Northern England)
  - Sinn Féin (SF) (Northern Ireland)
  - Progressive Unionist Party (PUP) (Northern Ireland)
  - Scottish Socialist Party (SSP) (Scotland)
  - Plaid Cymru (Wales)
  - Your Party (UK)
- United States:
  - Democratic Socialists of America
  - Socialist Party USA
  - Peace and Freedom Party
  - Green Party of the United States
  - Socialist Alternative (United States)
  - Green Mountain Peace and Justice Party (Vermont)
  - Vermont Progressive Party (Vermont)
  - Washington Progressive Party (Washington)
- Uruguay:
  - Broad Front:
    - Socialist Party of Uruguay
    - Movement of Popular Participation

=== V ===
- Venezuela:
  - For Social Democracy
  - Movement for Socialism

=== Z ===
- Zambia:
  - Rainbow Party

== See also ==
- Social democracy
- Democratic socialism
- List of social democratic parties
- List of social democratic and democratic socialist parties that have governed
- List of social democrats
- List of democratic socialists
- Socialist International
- Progressive International
