= Social democracy =

Centre-left political ideology

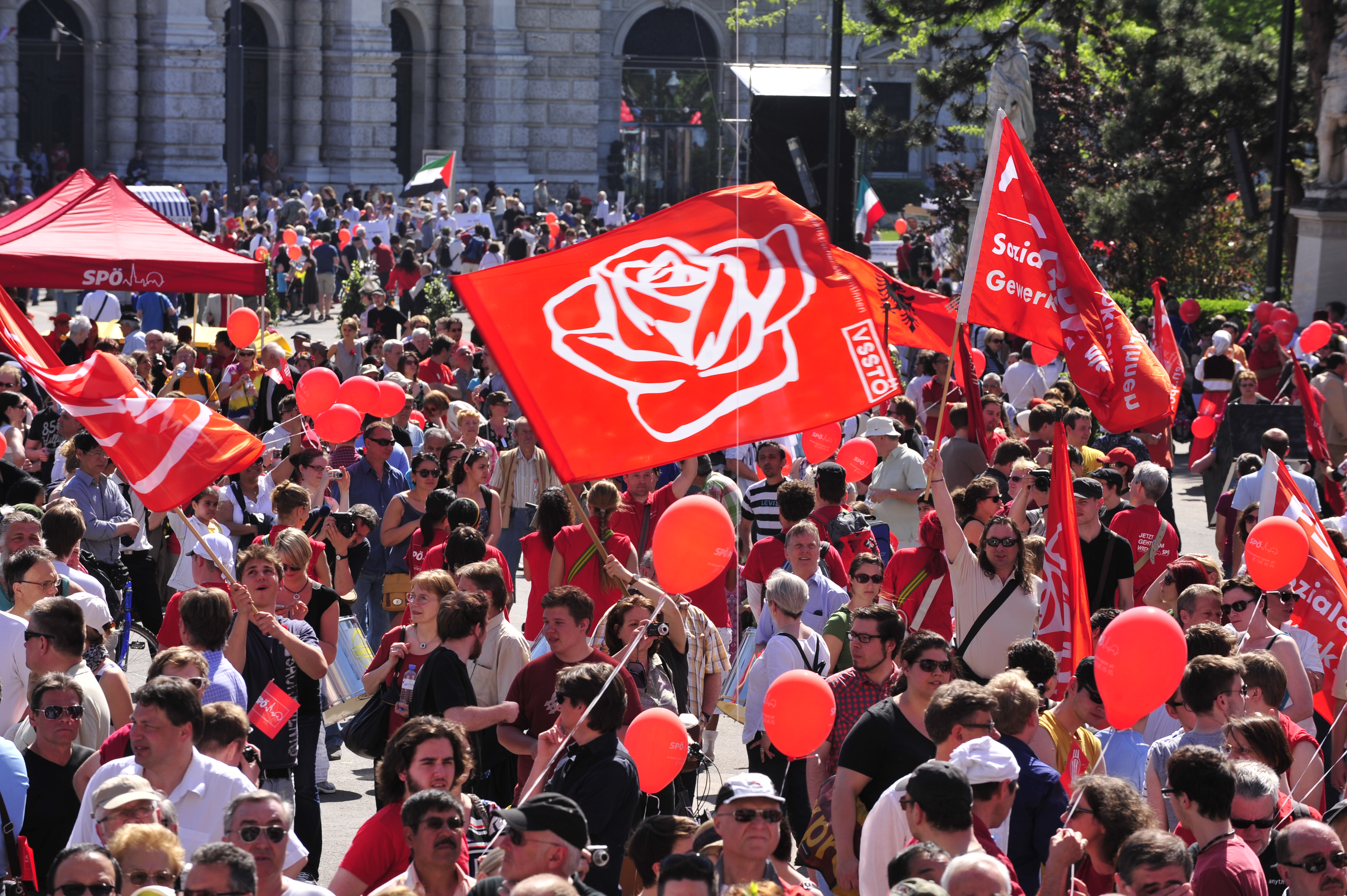
Demonstration by the Social Democratic Party of Austria on International Workers' Day, 2012

Social democracy is a social, economic and political ideology that supports political and economic democracy and a gradualist, reformist, and democratic approach toward achieving social equality. In modern practice, social democracy has taken the form of a predominantly capitalist, yet robust welfare state, with policies promoting social justice, market regulation, and a more equitable distribution of income.

Social democracy maintains a commitment to representative and participatory democracy. Common aims include curbing inequality, eliminating the oppression of underprivileged groups, eradicating poverty, and upholding universally accessible public services such as child care, education, elderly care, health care, and workers' compensation. Economically, it supports income redistribution and regulating the economy in the public interest.

Social democracy has a long-standing connection with trade unions and the broader labour movement. It is supportive of measures to foster greater democratic decision-making in the economic sphere, including collective bargaining and co-determination rights for workers.

The history of social democracy stretches back to the 19th-century labour movement. Originally a catch-all term for socialists of varying tendencies, after the Russian Revolution, it came to refer to reformist socialists who were strategically opposed to revolution as well as to the authoritarianism of the Soviet model, though the eventual abolition of capitalism was still upheld as an important end goal. However, by the 1990s social democrats had embraced mixed economies with a predominance of private property and promoted the regulation of capitalism over its replacement with a qualitatively different socialist economic system. Since then, social democracy has been associated with Keynesian economics, the Nordic model, and welfare states. The Third Way was developed in the 1990s as an offshoot of social democracy which aims to fuse economic liberalism with social democratic economic policies and center-left social policies. This reconceptualization is embraced by some social democratic parties, though some political scientists and analysts characterise it as an effectively neoliberal movement.

Social democracy, which is often placed generally on the centre-left of the political spectrum, has been described as the most common form of Western or modern socialism, as well as the reformist wing of democratic socialism. Some academics view social democracy as distinct from socialism, whilst other academics purport that social democracy lies within the wider socialist movement. Amongst social democrats, attitudes towards socialism vary: some retain socialism as a long-term goal, with social democracy being a political and economic democracy supporting a gradualist, reformist, and democratic approach towards achieving socialism. Others view it as an ethical ideal to guide reforms within capitalism. While both social democracy and democratic socialism once referred to movements seeking to achieve socialism, modern social democracies retain a capitalist system, whereas democratic socialists continue to advocate for its abolition. Nevertheless, the distinction remains blurred in colloquial settings, and the two terms are commonly used synonymously.

== Definitions ==
=== As a tradition of socialism ===
Social democracy is defined as one of many socialist traditions. As an international political movement and ideology, it aims to achieve socialism through gradual and democratic means. This definition goes back to the influence of both the reformist socialism of Ferdinand Lassalle and the internationalist revolutionary socialism advanced by Karl Marx and Friedrich Engels. Social democracy has undergone various major forms throughout its history. In the 19th century, it encompassed various non-revolutionary and revolutionary currents of socialism, excluding anarchism. In one of the first scholarly works on European socialism written for an American audience, Richard T. Ely's 1883 book French and German Socialism in Modern Times, social democrats were characterized as "the extreme wing of the socialists" who were "inclined to lay so much stress on equality of enjoyment, regardless of the value of one's labor, that they might, perhaps, more properly be called communists". In the early 20th century, social democracy came to refer to support for a process of developing society through existing political structures and opposition to revolutionary means, which are often associated with Marxism. Thus whereas in the 19th century, social democracy could be described as "organized Marxism", it became "organized reformism" by the 20th century.

Among Democratic Socialists, democratic socialism and social democracy are sometimes seen as synonyms, while they are distinguished in journalistic and political science use. Under this democratic socialist definition, (Note: "Social democracy is a political ideology focusing on an evolutionary road to socialism or the humanization of capitalism. It includes parliamentary process of reform, the provision of state benefits to the population, agreements between labor and the state, and the revisionist movement away from revolutionary socialism." "By the early twentieth century, ... many such [social democratic] parties had come to adopt parliamentary tactics and were committed to a gradual and peaceful transition to socialism. As a result, social democracy was increasingly taken to refer to democratic socialism, in contrast to revolutionary socialism." "Social democracy refers to a political theory, a social movement or a society that aims to achieve the egalitarian objectives of socialism while remaining committed to the values and institutions of liberal democracy." "In general, a label for any person or group who advocates the pursuit of socialism by democratic means. Used especially by parliamentary social democrats who put parliamentarism ahead of socialism, and therefore oppose revolutionary action against democratically elected governments. Less ambiguous than social democracy, which has had, historically, the opposite meanings of (1) factions of Marxism, and (2) groupings on the right of socialist parties.") social democracy is an ideology seeking to gradually build an alternative socialist economy through the institutions of liberal democracy. Starting in the post-war period, social democracy was defined as a policy regime advocating the reformation of capitalism to align it with the ethical ideals of social justice.

What socialists such as anarchists, communists, social democrats, syndicalists, and some social democratic proponents of the Third Way share in common is history, specifically that they can all be traced back to the individuals, groups, and literature of the First International, and have retained some of the terminology and symbolism such as the colour red. How far society should intervene and whether the government, mainly the existing government, is the right vehicle for change are issues of disagreement. As the Historical Dictionary of Socialism summarizes, "there were general criticisms about the social effects of the private ownership and control of capital", "a general view that the solution to these problems lay in some form of collective control (with the degree of control varying among the proponents of socialism) over the means of production, distribution, and exchange", and "there was agreement that the outcomes of this collective control should be a society that provided social equality and justice, economic protection, and generally a more satisfying life for most people". Socialism became a catch-all term for the critics of capitalism and industrial society. Social democrats are anticapitalists insofar as criticism about "poverty, low wages, unemployment, economic and social inequality, and a lack of economic security" is linked to the private ownership of the means of production.

Social democracy or social democratic remains controversial among socialists. (Note: Donald F. Busky wrote: "Social democracy is a somewhat controversial term among democratic socialists. Many democratic socialists use social democracy as a synonym for democratic socialism, while others, particularly revolutionary democratic socialists, do not, the latter seeing social democracy as something less than socialism—a milder, evolutionary ideology that seeks merely to reform capitalism. Communists also use the term social democratic to mean something less than true socialism that sought only to preserve capitalism by reform rather than by overthrowing and establishing socialism. Even revolutionary democratic socialists and Communists have at times, particularly the past, called their parties 'social democratic.'") Some define it as representing a Marxist faction and non-communist socialists or the right-wing of socialism during the split with communism. Others have noted its pejorative use among communists and other socialists. According to Lyman Tower Sargent, "socialism refers to social theories rather than to theories oriented to the individual. Because many communists now call themselves democratic socialists, it is sometimes difficult to know what a political label really means. As a result, social democratic has become a common new label for democratic socialist political parties."

=== As a policy regime ===
As a policy regime, social democracy entails support for a mixed economy and ameliorative measures to benefit the working class within the framework of democratic capitalism. Social democracy currently depicts a chiefly capitalist economy with state economic regulation in the general interest, state provision of welfare services and state redistribution of income and wealth. Social democratic concepts influence the policies of most Western states since World War 2. Social democracy is frequently considered a practical middle course between capitalism and socialism. Social democracy aims to use democratic collective action for promoting freedom and equality in the economy and opposes what is seen as inequality and oppression caused by laissez-faire capitalism.

In the 21st century, it has become commonplace to define social democracy in reference to Northern and Western European countries, and their model of a welfare state with a corporatist system of collective bargaining. Social democracy has also been used synonymously with the Nordic model. Henning Meyer and Jonathan Rutherford associate social democracy with the socioeconomic order in Europe from the post-war period until the early 1990s. Social democratic roots are also observed in Latin America during the early 20th century; this was the case in Uruguay during the two presidential terms of José Batlle y Ordóñez.

While the welfare state has been accepted across the political spectrum, particularly by conservatives (Christian democrats) and liberals (social liberals), one notable difference is that socialists see the welfare state "not merely to provide benefits but to build the foundation for emancipation and self-determination". In the 21st century, a social democratic policy regime (Note: "Social democracy therefore came to stand for a broad balance between the market economy, on the one hand, and state intervention, on the other. Although this stance has been most clearly associated with reformist socialism, it has also been embraced, to a greater or lesser extent, by others, notably modern liberals and paternalist conservatives.") may further be distinguished by a support for an increase in welfare policies or an increase in public services.

Some distinguish between ideological social democracy as part of the broad socialist movement and social democracy as a policy regime. They call the first classical social democracy or classical socialism, and the latter as competitive socialism, liberal socialism, neo-social democracy, or new social democracy.

The Third Way is sometimes regarded as an effort to combine social democratic values with economic liberalism, embraced most notably by Bill Clinton's New Democrats and Tony Blair's New Labour. Some analysts have characterized the Third Way as neoliberal rather than social democratic.

=== As a name for political parties ===
Many socialist parties in several countries have been, or are called Social Democratic. In the 19th century, social democrat was a broad catch-all for international socialists owing their primary ideological allegiance to Lassalle or Marx, in contrast to those advocating various forms of utopian socialism. Many parties in this era described themselves as Social Democrats, including the General German Workers' Association and the Social Democratic Workers' Party of Germany, which merged to form the Social Democratic Party of Germany, the Social Democratic Federation in Britain, and the Russian Social Democratic Labour Party. Social Democrat continued to be used in this context until the Bolshevik Revolution of October 1917, when Communist came into vogue for individuals and organizations espousing a revolutionary road to socialism. (Note: According to Richard T. Ely, "[social democrats] have two distinguishing characteristics. The vast majority of them are laborers, and, as a rule, they expect the violent overthrow of existing institutions by revolution to precede the introduction of the socialistic state. I would not, by any means, say that they are all revolutionists, but the most of them undoubtedly are. The most general demands of the social democrats are the following: The state should exist exclusively for the laborers; land and capital must become collective property, and production be carried on unitedly. Private competition, in the ordinary sense of the term, is to cease.")

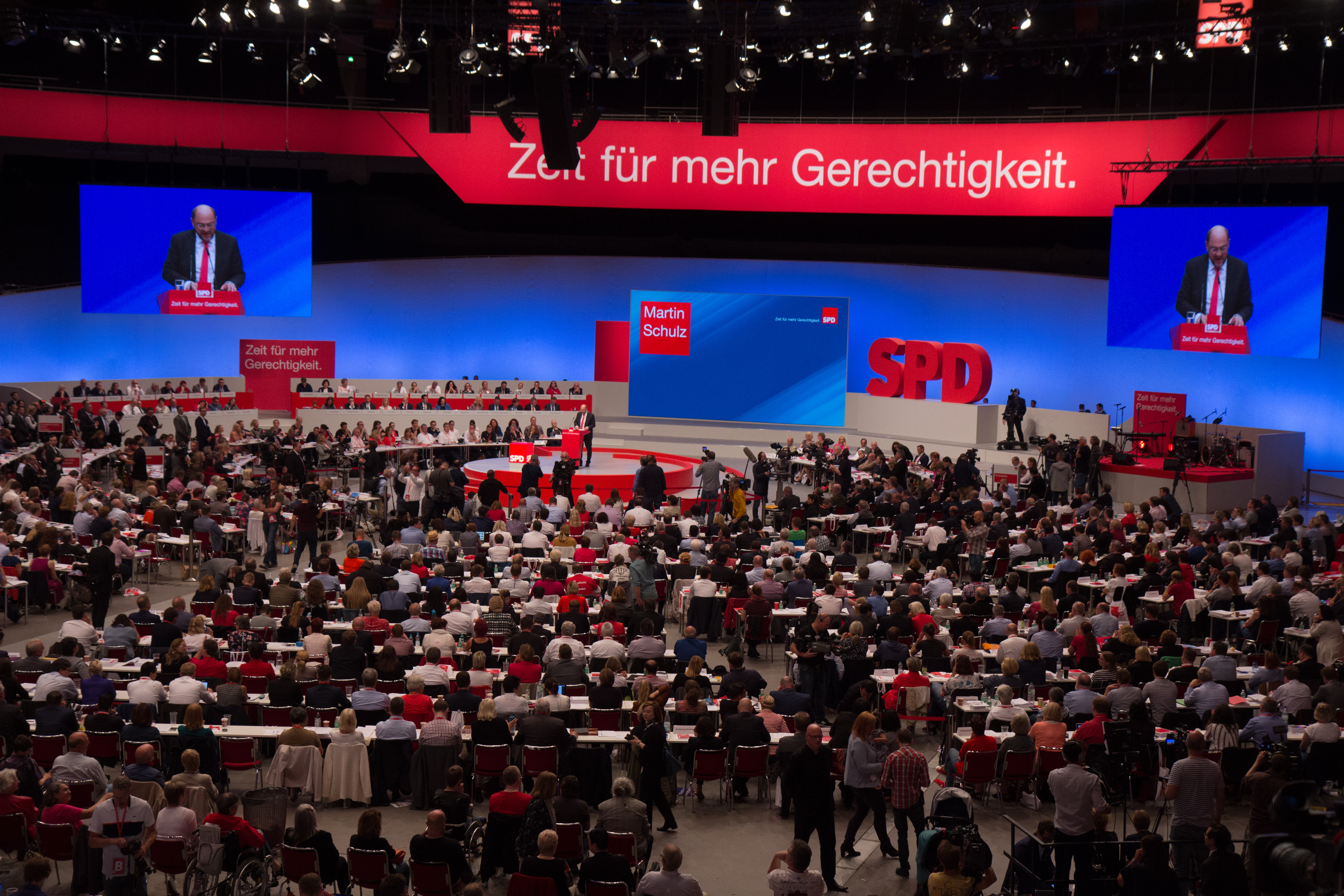
2017 conference for the Social Democratic Party of Germany

In the 20th century, the term came to be associated with the positions of the German and Swedish parties. The first advocated revisionist Marxism, while the second advocated a comprehensive welfare state. By the 21st century, parties advocating social democracy include Labour, Left, and some Green parties. (Note: "The far left is becoming the principal challenge to mainstream social democratic parties, in large part because its main parties are no longer extreme, but present themselves as defending the values and policies that social democrats have allegedly abandoned.") Most social democratic parties consider themselves democratic socialists and are categorized as socialists. They continue to reference socialism, either as a post-capitalist order or, in more ethical terms, as a just society, described as representing democratic socialism, without any explicit reference to the economic system or its structure. Parties such as the Social Democratic Party of Germany and the Swedish Social Democratic Party (Note: The party's first chapter in its statutes says "the intention of the Swedish Social Democratic Labour Party is the struggle towards the Democratic Socialism", which is defined as a society with a democratic economy based on the socialist principle "From each according to his ability, to each according to his need.") describe their goal as developing democratic socialism, with social democracy as the principle of action. In the 21st century, European social democratic parties represent the centre-left and most are part of the Party of European Socialists, while democratic socialist parties are to their left within the Party of the European Left. Many of those social democratic parties are members of the Socialist International, including several democratic socialist parties, whose Frankfurt Declaration declares the goal of developing democratic socialism. Others are also part of the Progressive Alliance, founded in 2013 by most contemporary or former member parties of the Socialist International.

=== As Marxist revisionism ===
Social democracy has been seen as a revision of Marxism, although this has been described as misleading for modern social democracy. Marxist revisionist Eduard Bernstein's views influenced and laid the groundwork for developing post-war social democracy as a policy regime, Labour revisionism, and the neo-revisionism of the Third Way. This definition of social democracy is focused on ethical terms, with the type of socialism advocated being ethical and liberal. Bernstein described socialism and social democracy in particular as organized liberalism; in this sense, liberalism is the predecessor and precursor of socialism, whose restricted view of freedom is to be socialized, while democracy must entail social democracy. For those social democrats who still describe and see themselves as socialists, socialism is used in ethical or moral terms, representing democracy, egalitarianism, and social justice rather than a specifically socialist economic system. Under this type of definition, social democracy's goal is that of advancing those values within a capitalist market economy, as its support for a mixed economy no longer denotes the coexistence between private and public ownership or that between planning and market mechanisms but rather, it represents free markets combined with government intervention and regulations.

== Philosophy ==
As a form of reformist democratic socialism, social democracy rejects the either/or interpretation of capitalism versus socialism. It claims that fostering a progressive evolution of capitalism will gradually result in the evolution of a capitalist economy into a socialist economy. All citizens should be legally entitled to certain social rights: universal access to public services such as education, health care, workers' compensation, and other services, including child care and care for the elderly. Social democrats advocate freedom from discrimination based on differences in ability/disability, age, ethnicity, gender, language, race, religion, sexual orientation, and social class.

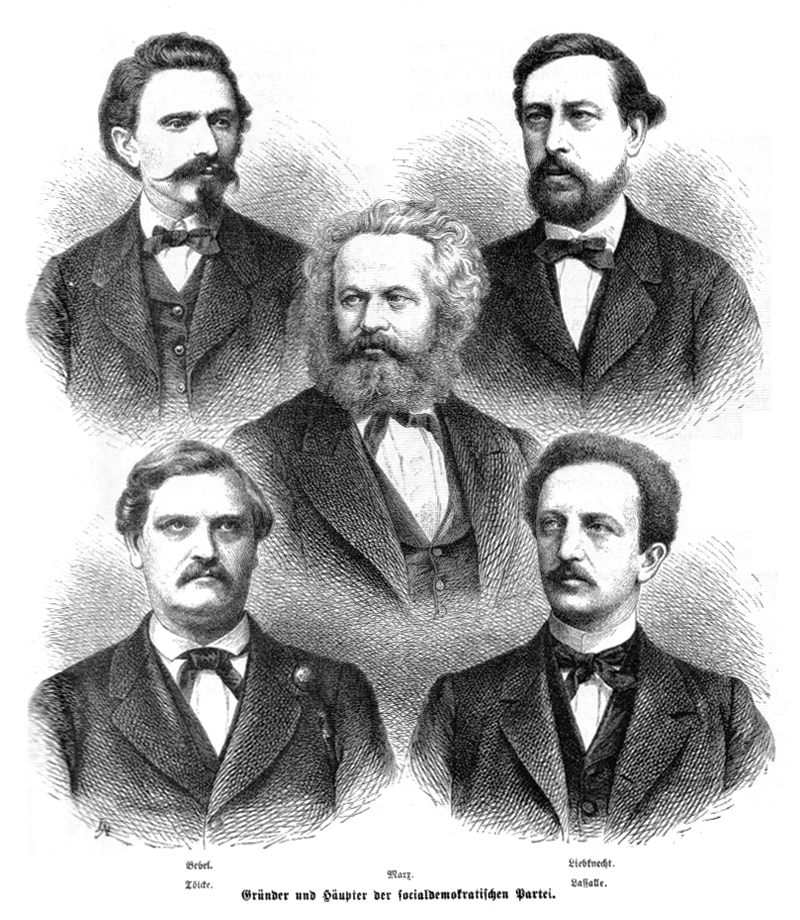
A portrait highlighting the five leaders of early social democracy in Germany (Note: They include from top to row August Bebel and Wilhelm Liebknecht from the Social Democratic Workers' Party of Germany; Karl Marx as an ideal pulse in the middle; and Carl Wilhelm Tölcke and Ferdinand Lassalle from the General German Workers' Association in the bottom row.)

Later in their lives, Karl Marx and Friedrich Engels argued that in some countries, workers might be able to achieve their aims through peaceful means. In this sense, Engels argued that socialists were evolutionists, although both Marx and Engels remained committed to social revolution. In developing social democracy, Eduard Bernstein rejected orthodox Marxism's revolutionary and materialist foundations. Rather than class conflict and socialist revolution, Bernstein's Marxist revisionism reflected that socialism could be achieved through cooperation between people regardless of class. Nonetheless, Bernstein paid deference to Marx, describing him as the father of social democracy but declaring that it was necessary to revise Marx's thought in light of changing conditions. Influenced by the gradualist platform favoured by the Fabian movement in Britain, Bernstein advocated a similar evolutionary approach to socialist politics that he termed evolutionary socialism. Evolutionary means include representative democracy and cooperation between people regardless of class. Bernstein accepted the Marxist analysis that the creation of socialism is interconnected with the evolution of capitalism.

August Bebel, Bernstein, Engels, Wilhelm Liebknecht, Marx, and Carl Wilhelm Tölcke are all considered founders of social democracy in Germany. However, Bernstein and Lassalle, along with labourists and reformists such as Louis Blanc in France, led to the widespread association of social democracy with socialist reformism. While Lassalle was a reformist state socialist, Bernstein predicted a long-term coexistence of democracy with a mixed economy during the reforming of capitalism into socialism and argued that socialists needed to accept this. This mixed economy would involve public, cooperative, and private enterprises, and it would be necessary for an extended period before private enterprises evolve of their own accord into cooperative enterprises. Bernstein supported state ownership only for certain parts of the economy that the state could best manage and rejected a mass scale of state ownership as being too burdensome to be manageable. Bernstein was an advocate of Kantian socialism and neo-Kantianism. Although unpopular early on, his views became mainstream after World War I.

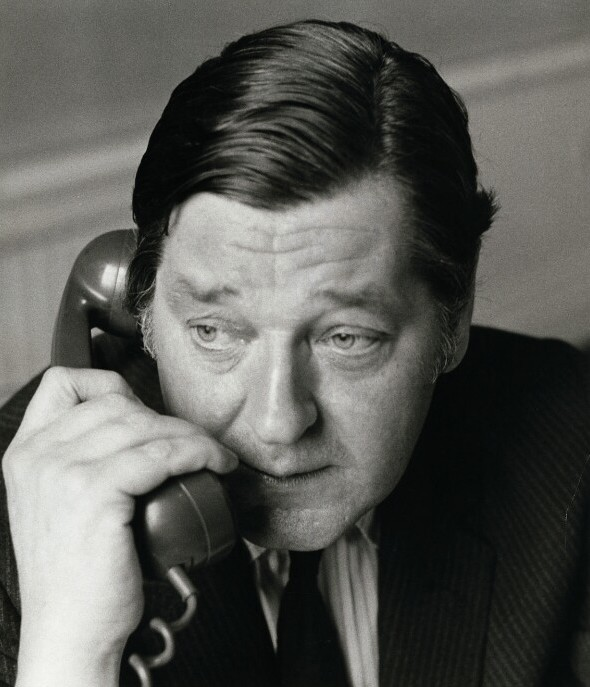
Anthony Crosland argued that traditional capitalism had been reformed and modified almost out of existence by the social democratic welfare policies after World War II.

In The Future of Socialism (1956), Anthony Crosland argued that "traditional capitalism has been reformed and modified almost out of existence, and it is with a quite different form of society that socialists must now concern themselves. Pre-war anti-capitalism will give us very little help", for a new kind of capitalism required a new kind of socialism. Crosland believed that these features of reformed managerial capitalism were irreversible, but it has been argued within the Labour Party and by others that Margaret Thatcher and Ronald Reagan brought about its reversal in the 1970s and 1980s. Although the post-war consensus represented a period where social democracy was "most buoyant", it has been argued that "post-war social democracy had been altogether too confident in its analysis" because "gains which were thought to be permanent turned out to be conditional and as the reservoir of capitalist growth showed signs of drying up". In Socialism Now (1974), Crosland argued that "[m]uch more should have been achieved by a Labour Government in office and Labour pressure in opposition. Against the dogged resistance to change, we should have pitted a stronger will to change. I conclude that a move to the Left is needed".

In Origin, Ideology and Transformation of Political Parties: East-Central and Western Europe Compared, Vít Hloušek and Lubomír Kopecek explain how socialist parties have evolved from the 19th to the early 21st centuries. As the number of people in traditional working-class occupations such as factory workers and miners declined, socialists have successfully widened their appeal to the middle class by diluting their ideology; however, there is still continuity between parties such as the SPD, the Labour Party in Britain, and other socialist parties which remain part of the same famille spirituelle, or ideological party family, as outlined by most political scientists. For many social democrats, Marxism is loosely held to be valuable for its emphasis on changing the world for a more just, better future.

== History ==
During the late 19th century and the early 20th century, social democracy was a broad labour movement within socialism that aimed to replace private ownership with social ownership of the means of production, distribution and exchange, taking influence from both Marxism and the supporters of Ferdinand Lassalle. It was Friedrich Engels who, in the second chapter of his 1844 article "The Condition of England", first coined the term "social democracy" while describing the future of the English political system. By 1868–1869, the socialism associated with Karl Marx had become the official theoretical basis of the first social democratic party established in Europe, the Social Democratic Workers' Party of Germany. In the early 20th century, the German social democratic politician Eduard Bernstein rejected orthodox Marxist ideas about the inevitable progression of history and the need for revolution, advancing instead the position that socialism should be grounded in ethical and moral arguments and achieved through gradual legislative reform. Bernstein's ideas were initially not well received; his party maintained the position that reforms should be pursued only as a means to an eventual revolution, not as a substitute for it. Bernstein was most notably criticized by Karl Kautsky in the book Bernstein und das sozialdemokratische Programm: Eine Antikritik. Kautsky criticized Bernstein's lack of directness, calling out Bernstein's confusion between freedom of will and freedom of action. Yet, Bernstein's ideas would have growing influence, particularly after the First World War.

The Russian Revolution was a pivotal moment that furthered the division between reformists and revolutionary socialists. Those supporting the October Revolution renamed themselves as Communists while those opposing the Bolsheviks retained the Social Democrat label. While both groups technically shared the goal of a communist society that fully realized the principle of "from each according to his ability, to each according to his need", the Communists sought to distance themselves from to Social Democracy's association with reformism. The Communists also sought to distinguish themselves from the socialists that had supported the imperialist Great War and thus betrayed proletarian internationalism. This reformist–revolutionary division culminated in the German Revolution of 1919, in which the Communists wanted to overthrow the German government and establish a soviet republic like Russia, while the Social Democrats wanted to preserve it as what came to be known as the Weimar Republic. Thus social democracy went from a "Marxist revolutionary" doctrine into a form of "moderate parliamentary socialism".

The Bolsheviks split from the Second International and created their own separate Communist International (Comintern) in 1919 that sought to rally revolutionary social democrats together for socialist revolution. With this split, the reformists founded the Labour and Socialist International (LSI) in 1923. The LSI had a history of rivalry with the Comintern, with which it competed over the leadership of the international socialist and labour movement.

During the 1920s and 1930s, social democracy became dominant in the socialist movement, mainly associated with reformist socialism while communism represented revolutionary socialism. Under the influence of politicians like Carlo Rosselli in Italy, social democrats began disassociating themselves from orthodox Marxism altogether as represented by Marxism–Leninism, embracing liberal socialism, Keynesianism, and appealing to morality rather than any consistent systematic, scientific, or materialist worldview. Social democracy appealed to communitarian, corporatist, and sometimes nationalist sentiments while rejecting the economic and technological determinism generally characteristic of orthodox Marxism and economic liberalism.

By the post-World War II period and its economic consensus and expansion, most social democrats in Europe had abandoned their ideological connection to orthodox Marxism. They shifted their emphasis toward social policy reform as a compromise between capitalism to socialism. According to Michael Harrington, the primary reason for this was the perspective that viewed the Stalinist-era Soviet Union as having succeeded in usurping the legacy of Marxism and distorting it in propaganda to justify totalitarianism. In its foundation, the Socialist International denounced the Bolshevik-inspired communist movement, "for [it] falsely claims a share in the Socialist tradition". Furthermore, core tenets of Marxism have been regarded by social democrats as having become obsolete, including the prediction that the working class was the decisive class with the development of capitalism. In their view, this did not materialize in the aftermath of mass industrialization during World War II.

In Britain, the social democratic Gaitskellites emphasized the goals of personal liberty, social welfare, and social equality. The Gaitskellites were part of a political consensus between the Labour and Conservative parties, famously dubbed Butskellism. Some social democratic Third Way figures such as Anthony Giddens and Tony Blair, who has described himself as a Christian socialist and a socialist in ethical terms, insist that they are socialists, for they claim to believe in the same values that their anti-Third Way critics do. According to those self-proclaimed social democratic modernizers, Clause IV's open advocacy of state socialism was alienating potential middle-class Labour supporters, and nationalization policies had been so thoroughly attacked by neoliberal economists and politicians, including rhetorical comparisons by the right of state-owned industry in the West to that in the Soviet Union and the Eastern Bloc, and nationalizations and state socialism became unpopular. Thatcherite Conservatives were adept at condemning state-owned enterprises as economically inefficient. For the Gaitskellites, nationalization was not essential to achieve all major socialist objectives; public ownership and nationalization were not explicitly rejected but were seen as merely one of numerous useful devices. According to social democratic modernizers like Blair, nationalization policies had become politically unviable by the 1990s.

During the Third Way development of social democracy, social democrats adjusted to the neoliberal political climate that had existed since the 1980s. Those social democrats recognized that outspoken opposition to capitalism was politically non-viable and that accepting the powers that be, seeking to challenge free-market and laissez-faire variations of capitalism, was a more immediate concern. The Third Way stands for a modernized social democracy, but the social democracy that remained committed to the gradual abolition of capitalism and social democrats opposed to the Third Way merged into democratic socialism. Although social democracy originated as a revolutionary socialist or communist movement, one distinction between democratic socialism and social democracy is that the former can include revolutionary means. The latter proposes representative democracy under the rule of law as the only acceptable constitutional form of government.

During the Great Recession, Social Democratic parties in Europe increasingly adopted austerity as a policy response to the economic crisis, shifting away from the traditional Keynesian response of deficit spending. According to Björn Bremer, this shift in thinking was due to the influence of supply-side economics on Social Democratic leaders and by electoral motivations whereby Social Democrats wanted to appear economically competent to voters by adopting orthodox fiscal policies.

== Social democracy and democratic socialism ==
Social democracy has some significant overlap in practical policy positions with democratic socialism, although they are usually distinguished from each other. In Britain, the revised version of Clause IV to the Labour Party Constitution, which was implemented in the 1990s by the New Labour faction led by Tony Blair, affirms a formal commitment to democratic socialism, describing it as a modernized form of social democracy; however, it no longer commits the party to public ownership of industry and in its place advocates "the enterprise of the market and the rigour of competition" along with "high quality public services either owned by the public or accountable to them". Many social democrats "refer to themselves as socialists or democratic socialists", and some such as Blair "use or have used these terms interchangeably". Others argue that "there are clear differences between the three terms, and preferred to describe their own political beliefs by using the term 'social democracy' only".

Democratic socialism (Note: Democratic socialism is generally defined as an anti-Stalinist left-wing big tent that opposes authoritarian socialism, rejecting self-described socialist states, as well as Marxism–Leninism and its derivatives such as Maoism and Stalinism. Besides social democrats, democratic socialists also include some anarchists, classical Marxists, democratic communists, libertarian socialists, market socialists, and orthodox Marxists such as Karl Kautsky and Rosa Luxemburg, as well as revisionists such as Eduard Bernstein, who supported social democracy.) represents social democracy before the 1970s, when the post-war displacement of Keynesianism by monetarism and neoliberalism caused many social democratic parties to adopt the Third Way ideology, accepting capitalism as the status quo for the time being and redefining socialism in a way that maintains the capitalist structure intact. Like modern social democracy, democratic socialism tends to follow a gradual or evolutionary path to socialism rather than a revolutionary one. Policies commonly supported are Keynesian and include some degree of regulation over the economy, social insurance schemes, public pension programs, and a gradual expansion of public ownership over major and strategic industries.

=== Internal debates ===
During the late 20th century, the social democracy and democratic socialism labels were variously embraced, contested and rejected due to the emergence of developments within the European left, such as Eurocommunism, the rise of neoliberalism, the fall of the Soviet Union and the Revolutions of 1989, the Third Way, and the rise of anti-austerity and Occupy movements due to the 2008 financial crisis (Note: It peaked after the mid-September 2008 outbreak.) and the Great Recession, the causes of which have been attributed by some to the neoliberal shift and deregulation economic policies. This latest development contributed to the rise of politicians, such as Jeremy Corbyn in Britain and Bernie Sanders in the United States, who rejected centrist politicians that supported triangulation within the Labour and Democratic parties.

According to both right-wing critics and supporters alike, policies such as universal health care and education are "pure Socialism" because they are opposed to "the hedonism of capitalist society". Because of this overlap, democratic socialism refers to European socialism as represented by social democracy, especially in the United States, where it is tied to the New Deal. Some democratic socialists who follow social democracy support "practical", progressive reforms of capitalism and are more concerned with administrating and humanising it, with socialism relegated to the indefinite future. Other democratic socialists want to go beyond mere meliorist reforms and advocate the systematic transformation of the mode of production from capitalism to socialism.

=== In the United States ===
Despite the long history of overlap between the two, with social democracy considered a form of democratic or parliamentary socialism and social democrats calling themselves democratic socialists, democratic socialism is sometimes considered a misnomer in the United States. One issue is that social democracy is equated with wealthy countries in the Western world, especially Western Europe, Australia, and New Zealand, while democratic socialism is conflated either with the pink tide in Latin America, especially with Venezuela, or with communism in the form of Marxist–Leninist socialism as practised in the Soviet Union and other self-declared socialist states. Democratic socialism has been described as representing the "left-wing" or "socialist" tradition of the New Deal.

The lack of a strong and influential socialist movement in the United States has been linked to the Red Scare, and any ideology associated with socialism brings social stigma due to its association with authoritarian socialist states.

Socialism has been used as a pejorative term by members of the political right to stop the implementation of liberal and progressive policies and proposals and to criticize the public figures trying to implement them. In contrast to Western Europe, Australia, and New Zealand, the United States never witnessed the consolidation of a major socialist party, as its socialist movement remained comparatively weak. A major contributing factor to this divergence lies in the legacy of slavery, which institutionalized profound and enduring racial divisions within the American working class. Unlike the relatively cohesive labor movements that emerged in societies lacking such a history, the U.S. working class was stratified along racial lines, producing a segmented labor market with distinct and often conflicting political priorities. This structural fragmentation undermined the development of class solidarity and posed a persistent obstacle to the formation of robust left-wing politics. Consequently, racial stratification constrained mass support for redistributive policies—particularly those concerning taxation, social welfare, and economic equality—thereby limiting the political viability of socialism in the American context.

Although Americans may reject the idea that the United States has characteristics of a European-style social democracy, it has been argued by some observers that it has a comfortable social safety net, albeit severely underfunded in comparison to other Western countries. It has also been argued that many policies that may be considered socialist are popular but that socialism is not. Others, such as Tony Judt, described modern liberalism in the United States as representing European social democracy.

Despite the lack of a strong socialist movement, the United States contains many democratic socialists, such as Bernie Sanders or Zohran Mamdani. Mamdani is remarkably notable, as his victory in the 2025 New York City mayoral election marked the largest victory in the 43-year history of the Democratic Socialists of America. Sanders is also remarkable in American democratic socialism, being the most recent democratic socialist to run for President of the United States, backed by the We Need Bernie campaign. The Democratic Socialists of America noted that their members had grown to over 24,000 members by July 2017, the largest since the Communist Party USA before its destruction in 1956, and by July 2026, had grown to over 120,000 members, surpassing the peak of the Socialist Party of America, to become the largest socialist organization in American history.

== Policy regime ==
Social democracy rests on three fundamental features, namely: "(1) parliamentary democracy, (2) an economy partly regulated by the state, and (3) provision of social support to those in need". In practice, social democratic parties have been instrumental in the social-liberal paradigm, lasting from the 1940s and 1970s, and called such because it was developed by social liberals but implemented by social democrats. Since those policies were mostly implemented by social democrats, social liberalism is sometimes called social democracy. In Britain, the social-liberal Beveridge Report drafted by the Liberal economist William Beveridge influenced the Labour Party's social policies, such as the National Health Service and Labour's welfare state development. This social-liberal paradigm represented the post-war consensus and was accepted across the political spectrum by conservatives, liberals and socialists until the 1970s. Similarly, the neoliberal paradigm, which replaced the previous paradigm, was accepted across the mainstream political parties, including social democratic supporters of the Third Way. This has caused much controversy within the social democratic movement.

=== Role of the state ===
From the late 19th century until the mid to late 20th century, there was greater public confidence in the idea of a state-managed economy that was a major pillar of communism, and to a substantial degree by conservatives and left-liberals. Aside from anarchists and other libertarian socialists, there was confidence amongst socialists in the concept of state socialism as being the most effective form of socialism. Some early British social democrats in the 19th century and 20th century, such as the Fabians, said that British society was already mostly socialist and that the economy was significantly socialist through government-run enterprises created by conservative and liberal governments which could be run for the interests of the people through their representatives' influence, an argument echoed by some socialists in post-war Britain. Advents in economics and observation of the failure of state socialism in the Eastern Bloc countries and the Western world with the crisis and stagflation of the 1970s, combined with the neoliberal rebuke of state interventionism, resulted in socialists re-evaluating and redesigning socialism. Some social democrats have sought to keep what they deem are socialism's core values while changing their position on state involvement in the economy and retaining significant social regulations.

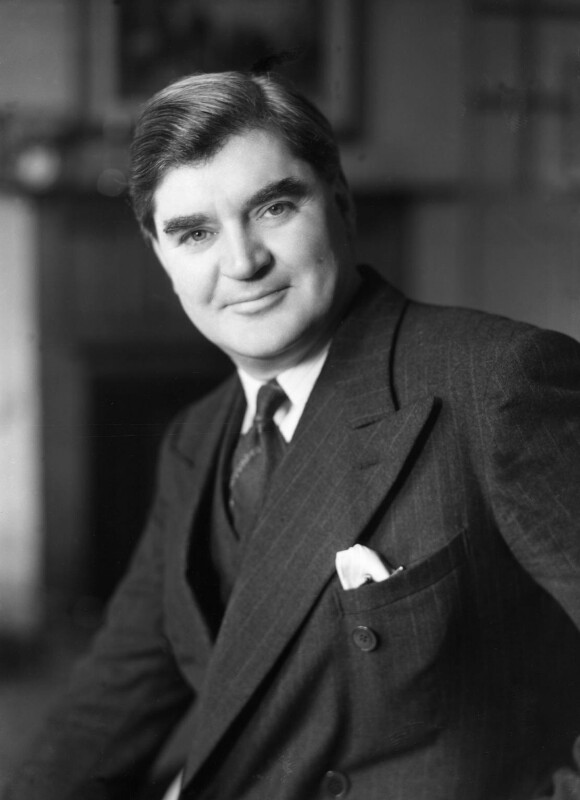
Aneurin Bevan, British minister of health (1945–1951)

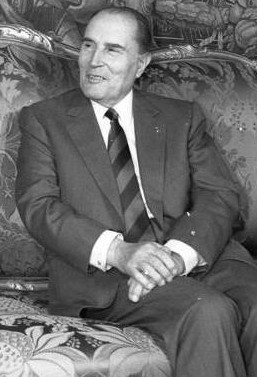
François Mitterrand, president of France
(1981–1995)

When nationalization of large industries was relatively widespread in the 20th century until the 1970s, it was not uncommon for commentators to describe some European social democracies as democratic socialist states seeking to move their countries toward a socialist economy. In 1956, leading Labour Party politician and British author Anthony Crosland said that capitalism had been abolished in Britain, although others such as Welshman Aneurin Bevan, Minister of Health in the first post-war Labour government and the architect of the National Health Service, disputed the claim. For Crosland and others who supported his views, Britain was a socialist state. According to Bevan, Britain had a socialist National Health Service, which opposed the hedonism of Britain's capitalist society.

Although, as in the rest of Europe, the laws of capitalism still operated fully and private enterprise dominated the economy, some political commentators stated that during the post-war period, when social democratic parties were in power, countries such as Britain and France were democratic socialist states. The same claim has been applied to Nordic countries with the Nordic model. In the 1980s, the government of President François Mitterrand aimed to expand dirigism and attempted to nationalize all French banks, but this attempt faced opposition from the European Economic Community because it demanded a free-market economy among its members. Public ownership never accounted for more than 15–20% of capital formation, further dropping to 8% in the 1980s and below 5% in the 1990s after the rise of neoliberalism.

The collapse of the legitimacy of state socialism and Keynesian interventionism (with the discovery of the phenomenon of stagflation) has been an issue for social democracy. This has provoked re-thinking of how socialism should be achieved by social democrats, including changing views by social democrats on private property—anti-Third Way social democrats such as Robert Corfe have advocated a socialist form of private property as part of new socialism (although Corfe technically objects to private property as a term to collectively describe property that is not publicly owned as being vague) and rejecting state socialism as a failure. Third Way social democracy was formed in response to what its proponents saw as a crisis in the legitimacy of socialism—especially state socialism—and the rising legitimacy of neoliberalism, especially laissez-faire capitalism. The Third Way's view of the crisis is criticized for being too simplistic. Others have criticized it because with the fall of state socialism, it was possible for "a new kind of 'third way' socialism (combining social ownership with markets and democracy), thereby heralding a revitalization of the social democratic tradition"; however, it has been argued that the prospect of a new socialism was "a chimera, a hopeful invention of Western socialists who had not understood how 'actually existing socialism' had totally discredited any version of socialism among those who had lived under it".

=== Corporatism ===
Social democracy influenced the development of social corporatism, a form of economic tripartite corporatism based upon a social partnership between the interests of capital and labour, involving collective bargaining between representatives of employers and labour mediated by the government at the national level. During the post-war consensus, this form of social democracy has been a major component of the Nordic model and, to a lesser degree, the West European social market economies.

The development of social corporatism began in Norway and Sweden in the 1930s and was consolidated in the 1960s and 1970s. The system was based upon the dual compromise of capital and labour as one component and the market and the state as the other. From the 1940s through the 1970s, defining features of social democracy as a policy regime included Keynesian economic policies and industrial agreements to balance the power of capital and labour and the welfare state. This is especially associated with the Swedish Social Democrats. In the 1970s, social corporatism evolved into neo-corporatism, which replaced it. Neo-corporatism has represented an important concept of Third Way social democracy. Social democratic theorist Robin Archer wrote about the importance of social corporatism to social democracy in his work Economic Democracy: The Politics of a Feasible Socialism (1995). As a welfare state, social democracy is a specific type of welfare state and policy regime described as being universalist, supportive of collective bargaining, and more supportive of public provision of welfare. It is especially associated with the Nordic model.

== Analysis ==
=== Legacy ===
Social democratic policies were first adopted in the German Empire between the 1880s and 1890s, when the conservative Chancellor Otto von Bismarck put in place many social welfare proposals initially suggested by the Social Democrats to hinder their electoral success after he instituted the Anti-Socialist Laws, laying the ground of the first modern welfare state. Those policies were dubbed State Socialism by the liberal opposition, but Bismarck later accepted and re-appropriated the term. It was a set of social programs implemented in Germany that Bismarck initiated in 1883 as remedial measures to appease the working class and reduce support for socialism and the Social Democrats following earlier attempts to achieve the same objective through Bismarck's Anti-Socialist Laws. This did not prevent the Social Democrats from becoming the biggest party in parliament by 1912.

Similar policies were later adopted in most of Western Europe, including France and the United Kingdom (the latter in the form of the Liberal welfare reforms), with both socialist and liberal parties adopting those policies. In the United States, the original Progressive Era-movement (a social democratic movement influenced by social liberalism, social populism, and democratic socialism) supported some progressive conservatives like Republican presidents Theodore Roosevelt and Taft as well as some progressive liberals such as those Democratic presidents Woodrow Wilson and Franklin D. Roosevelt (whose New Freedom and New Deal programmes adopted many social democratic policies). With the Great Depression, economic interventionism and nationalizations became more common worldwide and the post-war consensus until the 1970s saw Keynesian social democratic and mixed economy policies put in place, leading to the post-World War II boom in which the United States, the Soviet Union, the Western European, and East Asian countries experienced unusually high and sustained economic growth, together with full employment. Contrary to early predictions, this period of high economic growth and national development also included many countries that were devastated by the war, such as Japan (Japanese post-war economic miracle), West Germany and Austria (Wirtschaftswunder), South Korea (Miracle of the Han River), France (Trente Glorieuses), Italy (Italian economic miracle), and Greece (Greek economic miracle).

With the 1970s energy crisis, the abandonment of both the gold standard and the Bretton Woods system along with Keynesian social democratic, mixed-economy policies and the implementation of market-oriented, monetarist, and neoliberal policies (privatization, deregulation, free trade, economic globalization, and anti-inflationary fiscal policy, among others), the social democratic welfare state was put in doubt. This caused several social democratic parties to adopt the Third Way, a centrist ideology combining social democracy with neoliberalism; however, the Great Recession in the late 2000s and early 2010s cast doubts on the Washington Consensus, and protests against austerity measures ensued. There was a resurgence of social democratic parties and policies, especially in the United States and the United Kingdom, with the rise of politicians such as Bernie Sanders and Jeremy Corbyn, who rejected the Third Way, after the economic recession caused the Pasokification of many social democratic parties.

The United Nations World Happiness Report shows that the happiest nations are concentrated in social democratic nations, especially in Northern Europe, where the Nordic model is applied. This is at times attributed to the success of the social democratic Nordic model in the region, where similar democratic socialist, labourist, and social democratic parties dominated the region's political scene and laid the ground for their universal welfare states in the 20th century. The Nordic countries, including Denmark, Finland, Iceland, Norway, and Sweden, as well as Greenland and the Faroe Islands, also ranks highest on the metrics of real GDP per capita, economic equality, public health, life expectancy, solidarity, perceived freedom to make life choices, generosity, quality of life, and human development, while countries practising a neoliberal form of government have registered relatively poorer results. Similarly, several reports have listed Scandinavian and other social democratic countries as ranking high on indicators such as civil liberties, democracy, press, peace, and perceived freedom from corruption. Numerous studies and surveys indicate that people live happier lives in countries ruled by social democratic parties than those ruled by neoliberal, centrist, and right-wing governments.

=== Criticism ===
Other socialists criticize social democracy because it serves to devise new means to strengthen the capitalist system, which conflicts with the socialist goal of replacing capitalism with a socialist system. According to this view, social democracy fails to address the systemic issues inherent in capitalism. The American democratic socialist philosopher David Schweickart contrasts social democracy with democratic socialism by defining the former as an attempt to strengthen the welfare state and the latter as an alternative economic system to capitalism. According to Schweickart, the democratic socialist critique of social democracy is that capitalism can never be sufficiently humanized and that any attempt to suppress its economic contradictions will only cause them to emerge elsewhere. He gives the example that attempts to reduce unemployment too much would result in inflation, and too much job security would erode labour discipline. In contrast to social democracy's mixed economy, democratic socialists advocate a post-capitalist economic system based on either a market economy combined with workers' self-management or on some form of participatory, decentralized planning of the economy.

Marxian socialists argue that social democratic welfare policies cannot resolve the fundamental structural issues of capitalism, such as cyclical fluctuations, exploitation, and alienation. Accordingly, social democratic programs intended to ameliorate living conditions in capitalism, such as unemployment benefits and taxation on profits, creates further contradictions by further limiting the efficiency of the capitalist system by reducing incentives for capitalists to invest in further production. The welfare state only serves to legitimize and prolong the exploitative and contradiction-laden system of capitalism to society's detriment. Critics of contemporary social democracy, such as Jonas Hinnfors, argue that when social democracy abandoned Marxism, it also abandoned socialism and became a liberal capitalist movement, effectively making social democrats similar to non-socialist parties like the Democratic Party in the United States.

Market socialism is also critical of social democratic welfare states. While one common goal of both concepts is to achieve greater social and economic equality, market socialism does so through changes in enterprise ownership and management. Social democracy attempts to do so by subsidies and taxes on privately owned enterprises to finance welfare programs. Franklin Delano Roosevelt III (grandson of United States President Franklin D. Roosevelt) and David Belkin criticize social democracy for maintaining a property-owning capitalist class with an active interest in reversing social democratic welfare policies and a disproportionate amount of power as a class to influence government policy. The economists John Roemer and Pranab Bardhan point out that social democracy requires a strong labour movement to sustain its heavy redistribution through taxes and that it is idealistic to think such redistribution can be accomplished in other countries with weaker labour movements, noting that social democracy in Scandinavian countries has been in decline as the labour movement weakened.

Some critics say social democracy abandoned socialism in the 1930s by endorsing Keynesian welfare capitalism. The democratic socialist political theorist Michael Harrington argued that social democracy historically supported Keynesianism as part of a "social democratic compromise" between capitalism and socialism. Although this compromise did not allow for the immediate creation of socialism, it created welfare states and "recognized noncapitalist, and even anticapitalist, principles of human need over and above the imperatives of profit". Social democrats in favour of the Third Way have been accused of endorsing capitalism, including anti-Third Way social democrats who have accused Third Way proponents such as Anthony Giddens of being anti-social democratic and anti-socialist in practice. Some critics and analysts argue that many prominent social democratic parties, (Note: "With the rise of neoliberalism, social democracy turned towards the right and increasingly adopted neoliberal policies. When Tony Blair became British Prime Minister in 1997, his neoliberal vision of social democracy influenced social democracy around the world. The consequence was that social democracy became in many respects indistinguishable from conservative parties, especially in respect to class politics.") such as the Labour Party in Britain and the Social Democratic Party of Germany, even while maintaining references to socialism and declaring themselves democratic socialist parties, have abandoned socialism in practice, whether unwillingly or not.

Social democracy's reformism has been criticized by both the left and right, on the grounds that if reformist socialists were left to govern a capitalist economy, they would have to do so according to capitalist, not socialist, logic. For example, Joseph Schumpeter writes in Capitalism, Socialism and Democracy (1942): "Socialists had to govern in an essentially capitalist world... a social and economic system that would not function except on capitalist lines.... If they were to run it, they would have to run it according to its own logic. They would have to 'administer' capitalism". Similarly, Irving Kristol argued: "Democratic socialism turns out to be an inherently unstable compound, a contradiction in terms. Every social democratic party, once in power, soon finds itself choosing, at one point after another, between the socialist society it aspires to and the liberal society that lathered it". Joseph Stalin was a vocal critic of reformist social democrats, later coining the term social fascism to describe social democracy in the 1930s because, in this period, it embraced a similar corporatist economic model to the model supported by fascism. This view was adopted by the Communist International, which argued that capitalist society had entered the Third Period in which a proletarian revolution was imminent but could be prevented by social democrats and other fascist forces.

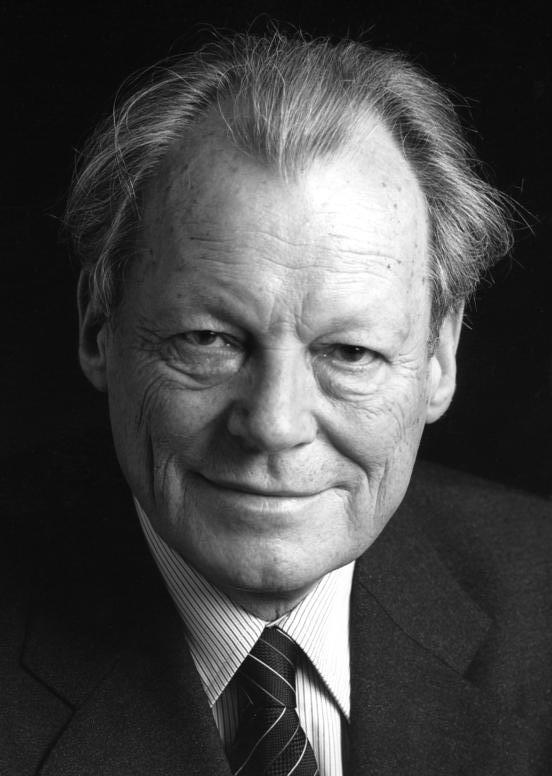
Willy Brandt (1913–1992). He was the first Social Democrat in West Germany to hold the office of chancellor.

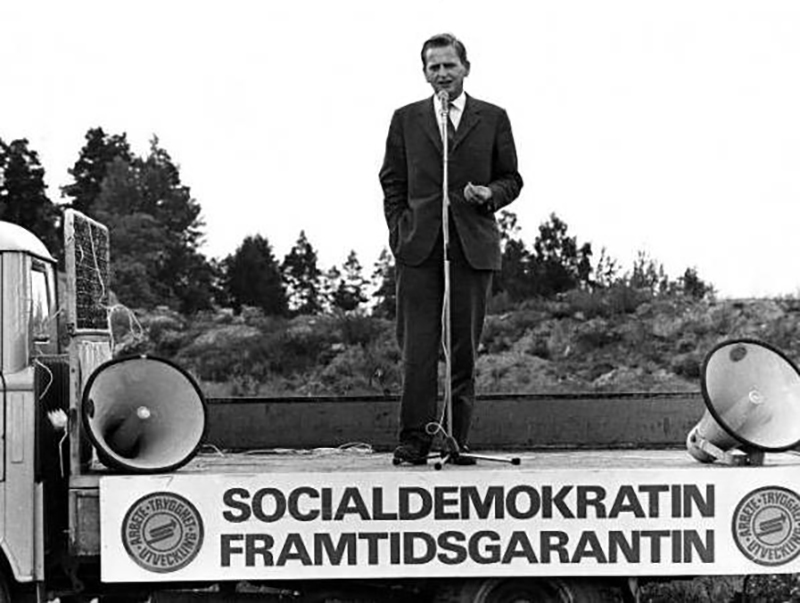
Olof Palme in 1968. The historic leader of Swedish and European social democracy.

== See also ==
- Pasokification
- Economic progressivism
- Fist and rose
- History of the Social Democratic Party of Austria
- History of the Social Democratic Party of Germany
- International Group of Democratic Socialists
- Keynesian economics
- List of anti-capitalist and communist parties with national parliamentary representation
- List of social democratic and democratic socialist parties that have governed
- List of democratic socialist parties and organizations
- List of democratic socialists
- List of Labour parties
- List of left-wing political parties
- List of social democratic parties
- List of social democrats
- Nordic model
- Progressive capitalism
- Social Democratic Party
- Socialist Party
- Socialist Union of Central-Eastern Europe
- Social policy
- Three Arrows
