= Democratic socialism =

Political philosophy

Democratic socialism is a set of left-wing political philosophies that supports political democracy and some form of a socially owned economy, with a particular emphasis on economic democracy, workplace democracy, and workers' self-management within a market socialist, decentralised planned, or democratic centrally planned socialist economy. Democratic socialists argue that capitalism is inherently incompatible with the values of freedom, equality, and solidarity and that these ideals can only be achieved through the realisation of a socialist society. Although most democratic socialists seek a gradual transition to socialism, democratic socialism can support revolutionary or reformist politics to establish socialism. Democratic socialism was popularised by socialists who opposed the backsliding towards a one-party state in the Soviet Union and other nations during the 20th century.

The history of democratic socialism can be traced back to 19th-century socialist thinkers across Europe and the Chartist movement in the United Kingdom, which somewhat differed in their goals but shared a common demand for democratic decision-making and public ownership of the means of production and viewed these as fundamental characteristics of the society they advocated for. From the late 19th to the early 20th century, democratic socialism was heavily influenced by the gradualist form of socialism promoted by the British Fabian Society and Eduard Bernstein's evolutionary socialism in Germany. Following the rise of "actually existing", barracks socialism in the mid-20th century, "democratic socialism" became defined as distinguishing between social democracy and Soviet socialism.

Democratic socialism is what most socialists understand by the concept of socialism. The term may be used broadly or more narrowly. As a broad movement, it includes forms of libertarian socialism, market socialism, reformist socialism, revolutionary socialism, ethical socialism, liberal socialism, state socialism, left populism, Trotskyism, and Eurocommunism all of which share a commitment to democracy.

Democratic socialism is contrasted with the concept of "authoritarian socialism". Democratic socialists oppose the Stalinist political system and the Marxist–Leninist economic planning system, rejecting as their form of governance the administrative-command model formed in the Soviet Union and other 'real socialist' states during the 20th century. They also oppose forms of Third World socialism that fall into authoritarian practices. Democratic socialism is also distinguished from Third Way social democracy (Note: "The far left is becoming the principal challenge to mainstream social democratic parties, in large part because its main parties are no longer extreme, but present themselves as defending the values and policies that social democrats have allegedly abandoned.") because democratic socialists are committed to the systemic transformation of the economy from capitalism to socialism, (Note: Social democratic proponents of the Third Way were more concerned about challenging the New Right to win back government power. This has resulted in analysts and critics arguing that they endorsed capitalism, even if it was due to recognising that outspoken anti-capitalism in these circumstances was politically nonviable, or that it was not only anti-socialist and neoliberal but anti-social democratic in practice. Some observers maintain this was the result of their type of reformism that caused them to administer the system according to capitalist logic, while others saw it as a modern liberal form of democratic socialism within the context of market socialism, and distinguish it from classical democratic socialism.) while social democrats use capitalism to create a strong welfare state, leaving many businesses under private ownership. However, many democratic socialists also advocate for state regulations and welfare programs in order to reduce the perceived harms of capitalism and slowly transform the economic system.

While having socialism as a long-term goal, some moderate democratic socialists are more concerned about curbing capitalism's excesses and are supportive of progressive reforms to humanise it in the present day. In contrast, other democratic socialists believe that economic interventionism and similar policy reforms aimed at addressing social inequalities and suppressing capitalism's economic contradictions can simply exacerbate them or cause them to emerge under a different guise. Those democratic socialists believe that the fundamental issues with capitalism can only be resolved by revolutionary means of replacing the capitalist mode of production with the socialist mode of production through a replacement of private ownership with collective ownership of the means of production and extending democracy to the economic sphere in the form of workplace democracy or industrial democracy. The main criticism of democratic socialism from the perspective of liberal democrats is focused on the compatibility of democracy and socialism, while Marxist–Leninist criticisms are focused on the feasibility of achieving a socialist or communist society through democratic means or without suppressing counter-revolutionary forces. Several academics, political commentators, and scholars have noted that some Western countries, such as France, Sweden and the United Kingdom, have been governed by socialist parties or have social democratic mixed economies sometimes referred to as "democratic socialist". However, following the end of the Cold War, many of these countries have moved away from socialism as a neoliberal consensus replaced the social democratic consensus in the advanced capitalist world.

== Overview ==
The fist and rose, a common symbol of democratic socialism and social democracy

As a political tradition, democratic socialism represents a broad anti-Stalinist leftist and, in many cases, anti-Leninist strand within the socialist movement, including anti-authoritarian socialism from below, libertarian socialism, market socialism, Marxism and certain left communist and ultra-left tendencies such as councilism and communisation as well as classical and libertarian Marxism. It also includes the orthodox Marxism related to Karl Kautsky and Rosa Luxemburg, as well as the revisionism of Eduard Bernstein. In addition, democratic socialism is related to the trend of Eurocommunism originating between the 1950s and 1980s, referring to communist parties that adopted democratic socialism after Nikita Khrushchev's de-Stalinisation in 1956, but also that of most communist parties since the 1990s.

As a related ideology, classical social democracy is a form of democratic socialism. Social democracy underwent various major forms throughout its history and is distinguished between the early trend that supported revolutionary socialism, mainly related to Marx and Engels, as well as other notable social-democratic politicians and orthodox Marxist thinkers such as Bernstein, Kautsky, Luxemburg and Lenin, including more democratic and libertarian interpretations of Leninism; the revisionist trend adopted by Bernstein and other reformist socialist leaders between the 1890s and 1940s; the post-war trend that adopted or endorsed Keynesian welfare capitalism as part of a compromise between capitalism and socialism; and those opposed to the Third Way.

Democratic socialism is contrasted with Marxism–Leninism, which its opponents often view as being authoritarian, bureaucratic, and undemocratic in practice. Democratic socialists oppose the Stalinist political system and the Marxist–Leninist economic planning system, rejecting as their form of governance the administrative-command model formed in the Soviet Union and other Marxist–Leninist states during the 20th century. Democratic socialism is also distinguished from the Third Way variant of social democracy (Note: "The far left is becoming the principal challenge to mainstream social democratic parties, in large part because its main parties are no longer extreme, but present themselves as defending the values and policies that social democrats have allegedly abandoned.") because democratic socialists are committed to the systemic transformation of the economy from capitalism to socialism, (Note: Social democratic proponents of the Third Way were more concerned about challenging the New Right to win back government power. This has resulted in analysts and critics arguing that they endorsed capitalism, even if it was due to recognising that outspoken anti-capitalism in these circumstances was politically nonviable, or that it was not only anti-socialist and neoliberal but anti-social democratic in practice. Some observers maintain this was the result of their type of socialist reformism that caused them to administer the system according to capitalist logic, while others saw it as a modern liberal form of democratic socialism within the context of market socialism, and distinguish it from classical democratic socialism.) while Third Way social democrats use capitalism to create a strong welfare state, leaving many businesses under private ownership. However, many democratic socialists also advocate for state regulations and welfare programs in order to reduce the perceived harms of capitalism and slowly transform the economic system.

While having socialism as a long-term goal, some moderate democratic socialists are more concerned about curbing capitalism's excesses and are supportive of progressive reforms to humanise it in the present day. In contrast, other democratic socialists believe that economic interventionism and similar policy reforms aimed at addressing social inequalities and suppressing capitalism's economic contradictions can simply exacerbate them or cause them to emerge under a different guise. Those democratic socialists believe that the fundamental issues with capitalism can only be resolved by revolutionary means of replacing the capitalist mode of production with the socialist mode of production through a replacement of private ownership with collective ownership of the means of production and extending democracy to the economic sphere in the form of workplace democracy or industrial democracy. The main criticism of democratic socialism from the perspective of liberal democrats is focused on the compatibility of democracy and socialism, while Marxist–Leninist criticisms are focused on the feasibility of achieving a socialist or communist society through democratic means or without suppressing counter-revolutionary forces. Several academics, political commentators, and scholars have noted that some Western countries, such as France, Sweden and the United Kingdom, have been governed by socialist parties or have social democratic mixed economies sometimes referred to as "democratic socialist". However, some have argued that following the end of the Cold War, many of these countries have moved away from socialism as a neoliberal consensus replaced the social democratic consensus in the advanced capitalist world.

Revolutionary democratic socialism, in contrast to social democracy, is defined as having a socialist economy in which the means of production are socially and collectively owned or controlled alongside a democratic political system of government. Democratic socialists reject most self-described socialist states, which followed Marxism–Leninism. In democratic socialism, the active participation of the population and workers in the self-management of the economy characterises socialism, while administrative-command systems do not. Nicos Poulantzas makes a similar, more complex argument. For Hal Draper, revolutionary-democratic socialism is a type of socialism from below, writing in The Two Souls of Socialism that "the leading spokesman in the Second International of a revolutionary-democratic Socialism-from-Below was Rosa Luxemburg, who so emphatically put her faith and hope in the spontaneous struggle of a free working class that the myth-makers invented for her a 'theory of spontaneity.'" Similarly, he wrote about Eugene V. Debs that "'Debsian socialism' evoked a tremendous response from the heart of the people, but Debs had no successor as a tribune of revolutionary-democratic socialism."

Some Marxist socialists emphasise Karl Marx's belief in democracy and call themselves democratic socialists. The Socialist Party of Great Britain and the World Socialist Movement define socialism in its classical formulation as a "system of society based upon the common ownership and democratic control of the means and instruments for producing and distributing wealth by and in the interest of the community." Additionally, they include classlessness, statelessness and the abolition of wage labour as characteristics of a socialist society, characterising it as a stateless, propertyless, post-monetary economy based on calculation in kind, a free association of producers, workplace democracy and free access to goods and services produced solely for use and not for exchange. Although these characteristics are usually reserved to describe a communist society, this is consistent with the usage of Marx, Friedrich Engels and others, who referred to communism and socialism interchangeably.

=== Definition ===
The Democratic Socialists of America (DSA), defines democratic socialism as a decentralised socially-owned economy and rejecting both authoritarian socialism and social democracy, stating:

Capitalism is a system designed by the owning class to exploit the rest of us for their own profit. We must replace it with democratic socialism, a system where ordinary people have a real voice in our workplaces, neighborhoods, and society. We believe there are many avenues that feed into [democratic socialism]. Our vision pushes further than historic social democracy and leaves behind authoritarian visions of socialism in the dustbin of history.

Tony Benn, a prominent left-wing Labour Party politician, described democratic socialism as socialism that is "open, libertarian, pluralistic, humane and democratic; nothing whatever in common with the harsh, centralised, dictatorial and mechanistic images which are purposely presented by our opponents and a tiny group of people who control the mass media in Britain."

Some tendencies of democratic socialism advocate for a social revolution to transition to socialism, distinguishing it from some forms of social democracy. In Soviet politics, democratic socialism is the version of the Soviet Union model reformed democratically. Soviet leader Mikhail Gorbachev described perestroika as building a "new, humane and democratic socialism." Consequently, some former communist parties have rebranded themselves as democratic socialists. This includes parties such as The Left in Germany, a party succeeding the Party of Democratic Socialism, which was itself the legal successor of the Socialist Unity Party of Germany.

Some uses of the term democratic socialism represent social democratic policies within capitalism instead of an ideology that aims to transcend and replace capitalism, although this is not always the case. Robert M. Page, a reader in Democratic Socialism and Social Policy at the University of Birmingham, wrote about transformative democratic socialism to refer to the politics of Labour Party Prime Minister Clement Attlee and its government (fiscal redistribution, some degree of public ownership and a strong welfare state) and revisionist democratic socialism as developed by Labour Party politician Anthony Crosland and Labour Party Prime Minister Harold Wilson, arguing:

The most influential revisionist Labour thinker, Anthony Crosland, contended that a more "benevolent" form of capitalism had emerged since the Second World War. ... According to Crosland, it was now possible to achieve greater equality in society without the need for "fundamental" economic transformation. For Crosland, a more meaningful form of equality could be achieved if the growth dividend derived from effective management of the economy was invested in "pro-poor" public services rather than through fiscal redistribution.

The political scientist Lyman Tower Sargent offers a similar definition based on the practice of social democracy in Europe:

Democratic socialism can be characterised as follows:

- Much property held by the public through a democratically elected government, including most major industries, utilities, and transportation systems
- A limit on the accumulation of private property
- Governmental regulation of the economy
- Extensive publicly financed assistance and pension programs
- Social costs and the provision of services added to purely financial considerations as the measure of efficiency

Publicly held property is limited to productive property and significant infrastructure; it does not extend to personal property, homes, and small businesses. And in practice in many democratic socialist countries [sic], it has not extended to many large corporations.

== History ==
The origins of democratic socialism can be traced back to 19th-century utopian socialist thinkers and the Chartist movement in Great Britain, which somewhat differed in their goals but shared a common demand of democratic decision making and public ownership of the means of production, and viewed these as fundamental characteristics of the society they advocated for. Democratic socialism was also heavily influenced by the gradualist form of socialism promoted by the British Fabian Society and Eduard Bernstein's evolutionary socialism.

In the 19th century, democratic socialism was repressed by many governments; countries such as Germany and Italy banned democratic socialist parties. With the expansion of liberal democracy and universal suffrage during the 20th century, democratic socialism became a mainstream movement which expanded across the world. Democratic socialists played a major role in liberal democracy, often forming governing parties or acting as the main opposition party (one major exception being the United States).

== Democratic socialism and other socialist traditions ==
=== Democratic socialism and social democracy ===
Prior to the displacement of Keynesianism by neoliberalism and monetarism, which caused many social-democratic parties to adopt the Third Way ideology, accepting capitalism as the current status quo and powers that be, redefining socialism in a way that it maintained the capitalist structure intact, social democracy has been occasionally described as a form of democratic socialism. The new version of Clause IV of the British Labour Party's constitution, first adopted by former party leader Tony Blair, uses democratic socialism to describe a modernised form of social democracy. While affirming a commitment to democratic socialism, it no longer commits the party to public ownership of industry and, in its place, advocates "the enterprise of the market and the rigour of competition" along with "high quality public services ... either owned by the public or accountable to them." Donald F. Busky's Democratic Socialism: A Global Survey describes social democracy as a form of democratic socialism that follows a gradual, reformist or evolutionary path to socialism rather than a revolutionary one. This tendency is captured in the statement of Labour revisionist Anthony Crosland, who argued that the socialism of the pre-war world was now becoming increasingly irrelevant. This tendency has been evoked in works such as Roy Hattersley's Choose Freedom: The Future of Democratic Socialism, Malcolm Hamilton's Democratic Socialism in Britain and Sweden, and Jim Tomlinson's Democratic Socialism and Economic Policy: The Attlee Years, 1945–1951. A variant of this set of definitions is Joseph Schumpeter's argument in Capitalism, Socialism and Democracy (1942) that liberal democracies were evolving from liberal capitalism into democratic socialism with the growth of industrial democracy, regulatory institutions and self-management.

A key difference is that social democrats are mainly concerned with practical reforms within capitalism, with socialism either relegated to the indefinite future or perceived to have abandoned it in the case of the Third Way. More radical democratic socialists want to go beyond mere meliorist reforms and advocate the systemic transformation of the mode of production from capitalism to socialism.

The Third Way has been variously described as a new social democracy or neo-social democracy, standing for a modernised social democracy and competitive socialism. Some scholars argue though that some social democrats remained committed to the gradual abolition of capitalism and opposed the Third Way and that these forces merged into democratic socialism. During the late 20th century and early 21st century, these labels were embraced, contested and rejected due to the development within the European left of Eurocommunism between the 1970s and 1980s, the rise of neoliberalism in the mid to late 1970s, the fall of the Soviet Union in December 1991 and of Marxist–Leninist governments between 1989 and 1992, the rise and fall of the Third Way between the 1970s and 2010s and the simultaneous rise of anti-austerity, green, left-wing populist and Occupy movements in the late 2000s and early 2010s due to the 2008 financial crisis and the Great Recession, the causes of which have been widely attributed to the neoliberal shift and deregulation economic policies. This latest development contributed to the rise of politicians that represent a return to the post-war consensus social democracy, such as Jeremy Corbyn in the United Kingdom and Bernie Sanders in the United States, who assumed the democratic socialist label to describe their rejection of centrist politicians that supported triangulation within the Labour and Democratic parties such as with New Labour and the New Democrats, respectively.

Social democracy originated as a revolutionary socialist or communist movement. One distinction to separate the modern versions of democratic socialism and social democracy is that the former can include revolutionary means. In contrast, the latter asserts that the only acceptable constitutional form of government is representative democracy under the rule of law, which is to implement social change via reformism. Many social democrats "refer to themselves as socialists or democratic socialists", and some "use or have used these terms interchangeably." Others argue that "there are clear differences between the three terms, and preferred to describe their own political beliefs by using the term 'social democracy' only." In political science, democratic socialism and social democracy are occasionally seen as synonymous or otherwise not mutually exclusive, while they are usually sharply distinguished in journalistic use. While social democrats continue to call and describe themselves as democratic socialists or simply socialists, the meaning of democratic socialism and social democracy effectively reversed. Democratic socialism originally represented socialism achieved by democratic means and usually resulted in reformism, whereas social democracy included reformist and revolutionary wings. With the association of social democracy as a policy regime and the development of the Third Way, social democracy became almost exclusively associated with capitalist welfare states, while democratic socialism came to refer to anti-capitalist tendencies, including communism, revolutionary socialism, and reformist socialism.

==== Democratic socialist and social democratic political parties ====
While most social-democratic parties describe themselves as democratic socialists, with democratic socialism representing the theory and social democracy the practice and vice versa, political scientists distinguish between the two. Social democratic is used for centre-left political parties, "whose aim is the gradual amelioration of poverty and exploitation within a liberal capitalist society." On the other hand, democratic socialist is used for left-wing socialist parties, including left-wing populist parties such as The Left, Podemos and Syriza. This is reflected at the European party level, where the centre-left social democratic parties are within the Party of European Socialists and the Progressive Alliance of Socialists and Democrats, while left-wing democratic socialist parties are within the Party of the European Left and the European United Left–Nordic Green Left. These democratic socialist groups often include communist tendencies, in contrast to social democratic groups which exclude anti-capitalist tendencies.

According to Steve Ludlam, "the arrival of New Labour signalled an unprecedented and possibly final assault on the [British] Labour Party's democratic socialist tradition, that is to say the tradition of those seeking the transformation of capitalism into socialism by overwhelmingly legislative means. ... It would be a while before some of the party's social democrats—those whose aim is the gradual amelioration of poverty and exploitation within a liberal capitalist society—began to fear the same threat to Labour's egalitarian tradition as the left recognised to its socialist tradition." This was reflected similarly in Labour: A Tale of Two Parties by Hilary Wainwright in 1987. According to Andrew Mathers, Wainwright's book provided "a different reading which contrasted the 'ameliorative, pragmatic' social democratic tradition expressed principally in the Parliamentary Labour Party with a 'transformative, visionary' democratic socialist tradition associated mainly with the grassroots members engaged closely with extra-parliamentary struggles."

=== Democratic socialism and revolutionary socialism ===
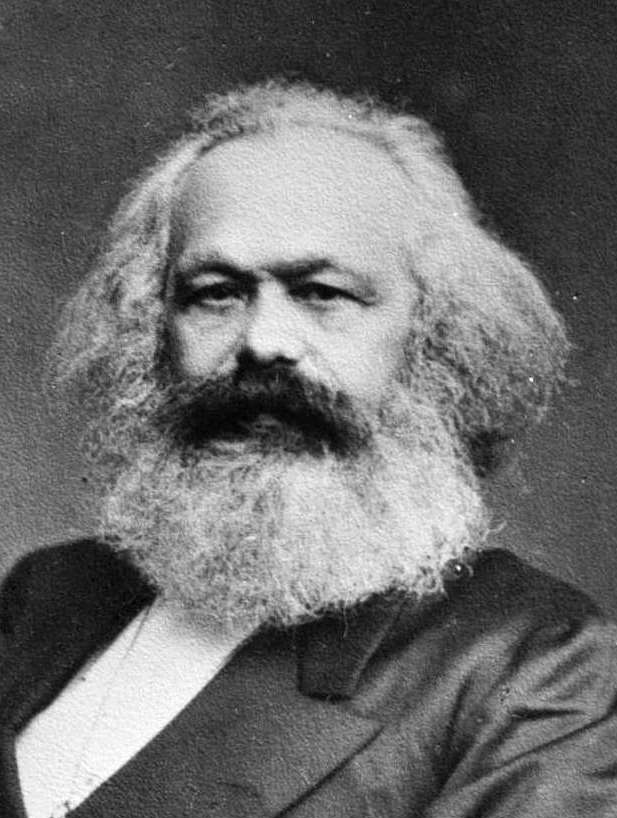
Karl Marx, whose thought influenced the development of democratic socialism, with some Marxists endorsing it and others rejecting it (Note: "Democratic Marxism is authentic Marxism — the Marxism which emphasizes the necessity for revolutionary action. Loyalty to the movement, not loyalty to any particular doctrine, is characteristic of the orthodox democratic Marxist." "There is considerable controversy among scholars regarding Marx's own attitude toward democracy, but two lines of thought developed from Marx: one emphasizing democracy and one, the dominant line, rejecting it.")

While socialism is frequently used to describe socialist states and Soviet-style economies, especially in the United States due to the First and Second Red Scares, democratic socialists use socialism to refer to the tendency that rejects the ideas of authoritarian socialism and state socialism as socialism, regarding them as a form of state capitalism in which the state undertakes commercial economic activity and where the means of production are organised and managed as state-owned enterprises, including the processes of capital accumulation, centralised management and wage labour. Democratic socialists include those socialists who are opposed to Marxism–Leninism and social democrats who are committed to the abolishment of capitalism in favour of socialism and the institution of a post-capitalist economy. Andrew Lipow thus wrote in 1847 the editors of the Journal of the Communist League, directly influenced by Marx and Friedrich Engels, whom Lipow describes as "the founders of modern revolutionary democratic socialism":

We are not among those communists who are out to destroy personal liberty, who wish to turn the world into one huge barrack or into a gigantic workhouse. There certainly are some communists who, with an easy conscience, refuse to countenance personal liberty and would like to shuffle it out of the world because they consider that it is a hindrance to complete harmony. But we have no desire to exchange freedom for equality. We are convinced that in no social order will freedom be assured as in a society based upon communal ownership.

Both Leninism and Marxism–Leninism have emphasised democracy, endorsing some form of democratic organisation of society and the economy whilst supporting democratic centralism, with Marxist–Leninists and others arguing that socialist states such as the Soviet Union were democratic. Marxist–Leninists also tended to distinguish socialist democracy from democratic socialism, which they associated pejoratively with "reformism" and "social democracy." Ultimately, they are considered outside the democratic socialist tradition. On the other hand, anarchism (especially within its social anarchist tradition) and other ultra-left tendencies have been discussed within the democratic socialist tradition for their opposition to Marxism–Leninism and their support for more decentralised, direct forms of democracy.

While both anarchists and ultra-left tendencies have rejected the label as they tend to associate it with reformist and statist forms of democratic socialism, they are considered revolutionary-democratic forms of socialism, and some anarchists have referred to democratic socialism. Some Trotskyist organisations such as the Australian Socialist Alliance, Socialist Alternative and Victorian Socialists or the French New Anticapitalist Party, Revolutionary Communist League and Socialism from below have described their form of socialism as democratic and have emphasised democracy in their revolutionary development of socialism. Similarly, several Trotskyists have emphasised Leon Trotsky's revolutionary-democratic socialism. Some such as Hal Draper spoke of "revolutionary-democratic socialism." Those third camp revolutionary-democratic socialists advocated a socialist political revolution to establish or re-establish socialist democracy in deformed or degenerated workers' states. Draper also compared social democracy and Stalinism as two forms of socialism from above, contraposed to his socialism from below as being the purer, more Marxist version of socialism.

== Economics ==
Democratic socialists have promoted various different models of socialism and economics, ranging from market socialism, where socially owned enterprises operate in competitive markets and are self-managed by their workforce, to non-market participatory economics based on decentralised economic planning, and democratic central planning. Democratic socialism can also be committed to a decentralised form of economic planning where productive units are integrated into a single organisation and organised based on self-management. Eugene V. Debs and Norman Thomas, both United States Presidential candidates for the Socialist Party of America, understood socialism to be an economic system structured upon production for use and social ownership in place of the for-profit system and private ownership of the means of production. Contemporary proponents of market socialism and decentralised planning have argued that rather than socialism itself, the primary reason for the economic shortcomings of Soviet-type economies was their administrative-command system and its failure to create rules and operational criteria for the efficient operation of state enterprises in their hierarchical allocation of resources and commodities. All types of democratic socialists, including those in favor of central planning, often cite the lack of democracy in the political and economic systems of Marxist–Leninist regimes as a reason for their historical or contemporary shortcomings or failures.

=== Democratic planning ===
A democratically planned economy has been proposed as a basis for socialism and variously advocated by some democratic socialists who simultaneously reject market socialism and Soviet-type economic planning. Democratic economic planning implies some process of democratic or participatory decision-making within the economy and firms in the form of industrial democracy. Supporters of democratic economic planning often reject market socialism on the basis that it fails to broadly coordinate information and resources according to social needs, and reject the Soviet model-based administrative-command system due to inefficient or undemocratic operation.

Democratic socialist proponents of decentralised planning assert that it allows for a spontaneously self-regulating system of stock control, relying solely on calculation in kind, to come about and that in turn decisively overcomes the objections raised by the economic calculation argument that any large-scale economy must necessarily resort to a system of market prices. Decentralised planning models often involve workers' councils or industrial unions, and include models proposed by anarchist economists Michael Albert and Robin Hahnel as participatory economics; and economist Pat Devine as "negotiated coordination," based on representative democracy.

On the other hand, democratic socialist proponents of centralised planning argue that it is better equipped to carry out economy-wide coordination and strengthen the collective power of the working class. David McNally, a professor at the University of Houston, has argued in the Marxist tradition that the logic of the market inherently produces social inequality and leads to unequal exchanges, writing that Adam Smith's moral intent and moral philosophy espousing equal exchange were undermined by the practice of the free market he championed as the development of the market economy involved coercion, exploitation and violence that Smith's moral philosophy could not counteract. McNally criticises market socialists for believing in the possibility of fair markets based on equal exchanges to be achieved by purging parasitical elements from the market economy, such as private ownership of the means of production, arguing that market socialism is an oxymoron when socialism is defined as an end to wage labour.

Various computer scientists and radical economists have also proposed computer-based forms of democratic economic planning and coordination between economic enterprises, based on either centralised or decentralised models. Chile explored computerised central planning from 1971 to 1973 with Project Cybersyn. In 1993, computer scientist Paul Cockshott and economics professor Allin Cottrell proposed in Towards a New Socialism a computerised central planning model based on direct democracy and modern technological advances.

=== Market socialism ===
Some proponents of market socialism see it as an economic system compatible with the political ideology of democratic socialism. Democratic socialist advocates of market socialism often support the development of worker cooperatives, and sometimes market-based sovereign wealth funds.

Advocates of market socialism, such as Jaroslav Vaněk, argue that genuinely free markets are impossible under private ownership of productive property. Vaněk contends that the class differences and unequal distribution of income and economic power that result from private ownership of industry enable the interests of the dominant class to skew the market in their favour, either in the form of monopoly and market power or by utilising their wealth and resources to legislate government policies that benefit their specific business interests. Additionally, Vaněk states that workers in a socialist economy based on worker-owned cooperatives have more substantial incentives to maximise productivity because they would receive a share of the profits based on the overall performance of their enterprise, plus their fixed wage or salary.

The Lange–Lerner model is a model first proposed by Oskar R. Lange in 1936 in response to the socialist calculation debate and later expanded by Abba P. Lerner in 1938, which is based on public ownership of the means of production with simultaneous market-based allocation of consumer goods. While this model is typically considered a type of centrally planned economy, Lange and Lerner referred to it as a market socialist model.

Some pre-Marx socialists and proto-socialists were fervent anti-capitalists just as they were supporters of the free market, including the British philosopher Thomas Hodgskin, the French mutualist thinker and anarchist philosopher Pierre-Joseph Proudhon and American philosophers Benjamin Tucker and Lysander Spooner, among others. Although capitalism has been commonly conflated with the free market, there is a similar laissez-faire economic theory and system associated with socialism called left-wing laissez-faire to distinguish it from laissez-faire capitalism.

One example of this democratic market socialist tendency is mutualism, a democratic and libertarian socialist theory developed by Proudhon in the 18th century, from which individualist anarchism emerged. Benjamin Tucker is one eminent American individualist anarchist who adopted a laissez-faire socialist system he termed anarchistic socialism as opposed to state socialism. This tradition has been recently associated with contemporary scholars such as Kevin Carson, Gary Chartier, Charles W. Johnson, Samuel Edward Konkin III, Roderick T. Long, Chris Matthew Sciabarra and Brad Spangler, who stress the value of radically free markets, termed freed markets to distinguish them from the common conception which these left-libertarians believe to be riddled with statism and bourgeois privileges.

Sometimes referred to as left-wing market anarchists, proponents of this approach strongly affirm the classical liberal ideas of self-ownership and free markets while maintaining that taken to their logical conclusions, these ideas support anti-capitalist, anti-corporatist, anti-hierarchical and pro-labour positions in economics, anti-imperialism in foreign policy and radically progressive views regarding sociocultural issues such as gender, sexuality and race. Such thinkers maintain that radical market anarchism should be seen by its proponents and by others as part of the socialist tradition because of its heritage, emancipatory goals and potential and that market anarchists can and should call themselves socialists. Critics of the free market and laissez-faire, as commonly understood, argue that socialism is fully compatible with a market economy and that a genuinely free-market or laissez-faire system would be anti-capitalist and socialist.

According to its supporters, this would result in the society advocated by democratic socialists, when socialism is not understood as state socialism and conflated with self-described socialist states. The free market and laissez-faire are free from all economic privilege, monopolies and artificial scarcities.

=== Implementation ===
While socialism is commonly used to describe Marxism–Leninism and affiliated states and governments, there have also been several anarchist and socialist societies that followed democratic socialist principles, encompassing anti-authoritarian and democratic anti-capitalism. The most notable historical examples are the Paris Commune, the various soviet republics established in the post-World War I period, early Soviet Russia before the abolition of soviet councils by the Bolsheviks, Revolutionary Catalonia as noted by George Orwell, and the Federation of Rojava in Northern Syria. Other examples include the kibbutz communities in modern-day Israel, Marinaleda in Spain, the Zapatistas of EZLN in the region of Chiapas, and to some extent, the workers' self-management policies within the Socialist Federal Republic of Yugoslavia and Cuba. However, the best-known example is Chile under President Salvador Allende, who was overthrown in a military coup funded and backed by the CIA in 1973.

When nationalisation of large industries was relatively widespread during the Keynesian post-war consensus, it was not uncommon for some political commentators to describe several European countries as democratic socialist states seeking to move their countries towards a socialist economy. In 1956, leading British Labour Party politician Anthony Crosland claimed that capitalism had been abolished in Britain. However, others, such as Aneurin Bevan, Minister of Health in the first post-war Labour government and the architect of the National Health Service, disputed the claim that Britain was a socialist state. For Crosland and others who supported his views, Britain was a socialist state. According to Bevan, Britain had a socialist National Health Service, which opposed the hedonism of Britain's capitalist society. Although the laws of capitalism still operated entirely as in the rest of Europe and private enterprise dominated the economy, several political commentators claimed that during the post-war period, when socialist parties were in power, countries such as Britain and France were democratic socialist states. The same claim is now applied to Nordic countries with the Nordic model. In the 1980s, the government of President François Mitterrand aimed to expand dirigisme by attempting to nationalise all French banks, but this attempt faced opposition from the European Economic Community, which demanded a capitalist free-market economy among its members. Nevertheless, public ownership in France and the United Kingdom during the height of nationalisation in the 1960s and 1970s never accounted for more than 15–20% of capital formation.

The form of socialism practised by parties such as the Singaporean People's Action Party during its first few decades in power was pragmatic, as it its rejection of mass nationalisation characterised it. The party still claimed to be socialist, pointing out its extensive regulation of the private sector, activist intervention in the economy and social welfare policies as evidence of this claim. Singaporean Prime Minister Lee Kuan Yew stated that he had been influenced by the democratic socialist factions of the British Labour Party.

== Philosophy ==
Democratic socialism involves the majority of the population controlling the economy through some democratic system, with the idea that the means of production are owned and managed by the working class. The interrelationship between democracy and socialism extends far back into the socialist movement to The Communist Manifesto's emphasis on winning as a first step the "battle of democracy", with Karl Marx writing that democracy is "the road to socialism." Socialist thinkers such as Eduard Bernstein, Karl Kautsky, Vladimir Lenin and Rosa Luxemburg wrote that democracy is indispensable to realising socialism. Philosophical support for democratic socialism can be found in the works of political philosophers such as Axel Honneth and Charles Taylor. Honneth has put forward the view that political and economic ideologies have a social basis, meaning they originate from intersubjective communication between members of society. Honneth criticises the liberal state and ideology because it assumes that principles of individual liberty and private property are ahistorical and abstract when they evolved from a specific social discourse on human activity. In contrast to liberal individualism, Honneth has emphasised the intersubjective dependence between humans, namely that human well-being depends on recognising others and being recognised by them. With an emphasis on community and solidarity, democratic socialism can be seen as a way of safeguarding this dependency.

== Views on the compatibility of democracy and socialism ==
=== Support ===
According to some writers, socialism itself is democratic in theory, seen as the highest democratic form by some of its proponents and at one point being seen as the same as democracy. Some argue that socialism implies democracy and that democratic socialism is a redundant term. However, others, such as Michael Harrington, argue that the term democratic socialism is necessary to distinguish it from that of the Soviet Union and other self-declared socialist states. For Harrington, the primary reason for this was the perspective that viewed the Stalinist-era Soviet Union as having succeeded in usurping the legacy of Marxism and distorting it in propaganda to justify its politics.

One of the foremost scholars who have argued that socialism and democracy are compatible is the Austrian-born American economist Joseph Schumpeter, who was hostile to socialism. In his book Capitalism, Socialism and Democracy (1942), Schumpeter emphasised that "political democracy was thoroughly compatible with socialism in its fullest sense". However, it has been noted that he did not believe that democracy was a sound political system and advocated republican values.

In a 1963 All India Congress Committee address, Indian Prime Minister Jawaharlal Nehru stated: "Political democracy has no meaning if it does not embrace economic democracy. And economic democracy is nothing but socialism."

Political historian Theodore Draper wrote: "I know of no political group which has resisted totalitarianism in all its guises more steadfastly than democratic socialists."

Historian and economist Robert Heilbroner argued that "[t]here is, of course, no conflict between such a socialism and freedom as we have described it; indeed, this conception of socialism is the very epitome of these freedoms", referring to open association of individuals in political and social life; the democratization and humanization of work; and the cultivation of personal talents and creativity.

Bayard Rustin, a long-time member of the Socialist Party of America and National Chairman of the Social Democrats, USA, wrote: "For me, socialism has meaning only if it is democratic. Of the many claimants to socialism only one has a valid title—that socialism which views democracy as valuable per se, which stands for democracy unequivocally, and which continually modifies socialist ideas and programs in the light of democratic experience. This is the socialism of the labor, social-democratic, and socialist parties of Western Europe."

Economist and political theorist Kenneth Arrow argued: "We cannot be sure that the principles of democracy and socialism are compatible until we can observe a viable society following both principles. But there is no convincing evidence or reasoning which would argue that a democratic-socialist movement is inherently self-contradictory. Nor need we fear that gradual moves in the direction of increasing government intervention will lead to an irreversible move to 'serfdom.'"

Journalist William Pfaff wrote: "It might be argued that socialism ineluctably breeds state bureaucracy, which then imposes its own kinds of restrictions upon individual liberties. This is what the Scandinavians complain about. But Italy's champion bureaucracy owes nothing to socialism. American bureaucracy grows as luxuriantly and behaves as officiously as any other."

Economic anthropologist Jason Hickel and his colleague Dylan Sullivan argue that in order to transcend the problems associated with the persistent underdevelopment in the contemporary "imperialist world economy", where "continued capital accumulation may create pressures for cheapening labour" which "works against the goals of human development," and also the top-down authoritarian socialism as experienced in the Soviet Union and Maoist China, which they argue is "at odds with the socialist goals of workers' self-management and democratic control over production," it will be necessary to adopt a "socialist strategy in the twenty-first century that is radically democratic, extending democracy to production itself."

Marxist theorist and revolutionary Leon Trotsky wrote that: "Socialism needs democracy like the human body needs oxygen". In particular, he believed that central planners in the Soviet Union, regardless of their intellectual capacity, operated without the input and participation of the millions of people who participate in the economy and so they would be unable to respond to local conditions quickly enough to effectively coordinate all economic activity. In the Transitional Program, which was drafted in 1938 during the founding congress of the Fourth International, Trotsky called for the legalization of the Soviet parties and worker's control of production.

=== Opposition ===
==== Non-communist opposition ====
Some anti-socialist politicians, economists, and theorists have argued that socialism and democracy are incompatible. According to them, history is full of instances of self-declared socialist states that at one point were committed to the values of personal liberty, freedom of speech, freedom of the press and freedom of association but then found themselves clamping down on such freedoms as they end up being viewed as inconvenient or contrary towards their political or economic goals. Chicago School economist Milton Friedman argued that a "society which is socialist cannot also be democratic" in the sense of "guaranteeing individual freedom." Sociologist Robert Nisbet, a philosophical conservative who began his career as a leftist, argued in 1978 that there is "not a single free socialism to be found anywhere in the world."

Neoconservative Irving Kristol argued: "Democratic socialism turns out to be an inherently unstable compound, a contradiction in terms. Every social democratic party, once in power, soon finds itself choosing, at one point after another, between the socialist society it aspires to and the liberal society that lathered it." Kristol added that "socialist movements end up [in] a society where liberty is the property of the state, and is (or is not) doled out to its citizens along with other contingent 'benefits'."

Similarly, anti-communist academic Richard Pipes argued: "The merger of political and economic power implicit in socialism greatly strengthens the ability of the state and its bureaucracy to control the population. Theoretically, this capacity need not be exercised and need not lead to growing domination of the population by the state. In practice, such a tendency is virtually inevitable. For one thing, the socialization of the economy must lead to a numerical growth of the bureaucracy required to administer it, and this process cannot fail to augment the power of the state. For another, socialism leads to a tug of war between the state, bent on enforcing its economic monopoly, and the ordinary citizen, equally determined to evade it; the result is repression and the creation of specialized repressive organs."

==== Communist opposition ====
On the other end of the spectrum, several Marxist, Trotskyist and communist thinkers and groups have strongly criticized democratic socialism and many of its aspects. The roots of this can be found in the early writings of Marx and Engels. In The Principles of Communism (1847), they describe democratic socialists as either "proletarians who are not yet sufficiently clear about the conditions of the liberation of their class" or "representatives of the petty bourgeoisie [...]."

Vladimir Lenin expanded on this critique, specifically targeting those who believe socialism can be achieved through democracy:

[...] the democratic republic, the Constituent Assembly, general elections, etc., are, in practice, the dictatorship of the bourgeoisie, and for the emancipation of labor from the yoke of capital there is no other way but to replace this dictatorship with the dictatorship of the proletariat.

Thus, he opposed attempts to achieve socialism by electoral or democratic means, viewing democratic institutions under capitalism as instruments of capitalist class rule.

Contemporary communist organizations such as the Bordigist International Communist Party (ICP) have echoed this view. In their article "Democratic Socialism: False Friend of the Working Class," the ICP argues that electoral democracy "will not be enough" for the overthrow of capitalism. They call for a proletarian revolution which strips the bourgeoisie of political rights and participation, and uses its "dictatorial grip on power to abolish by force the basis for capitalist exploitation." According to these communists, none of the problems caused by capitalism can be resolved through incremental democratic reforms or electoral victories as proposed by many democratic socialists. Instead, they claim, only a dictatorship of the proletariat and global proletarian revolution can dismantle the capitalist system and eliminate its "exploitative foundations."

== See also ==
- Democratic capitalism
- Democratic republic
- Democratic Socialist Party (disambiguation)
- International Group of Democratic Socialists
- List of anti-capitalist and communist parties with national parliamentary representation
- List of social democratic and democratic socialist parties that have governed
- List of democratic socialist parties and organizations
- List of democratic socialists
- List of Labour parties
- List of left-wing political parties
- List of social democratic parties
- List of social democrats
- Millennial socialism
- Popular socialism
- Social Democratic Party
- Socialist Party
- Soviet democracy
- Workers' council

== Bibliography ==
- Barrow, Logie; Bullock, Ian (1996). Democratic Ideas and the British Labour Movement, 1880–1914. Cambridge University Press. ISBN 9780521560429.
- Benn, Tony (1980). Arguments for Socialism. Penguin Books. ISBN 9780140054897.
- Dorrien, Gary (2019). Social Democracy in the Making: The Political and Religious Roots of European Socialism. Yale University Press. ISBN 9780300236026.
- Harrington, Michael (1989). Socialism: Past and Future. Arcade Publishing. ISBN 9781559700009.
- Hatterlsey, Roy (1987). Choose Freedom: The Future of Democratic Socialism. Penguin Books. ISBN 0140104941.
- Doherty, James C.; Lamb, Peter (2006). Historical Dictionary of Socialism (2nd ed.). The Scarecrow Press. ISBN 9780810855601.
- Miliband, Ralph (1994). Socialism for a Sceptical Age. London, United Kingdom: Polity Press. ISBN 9780745614274.
- Reisman, Reidsman, ed. (1996). Democratic Socialism in Britain: Classic Texts in Economic and Political Thought, 1825–1952. Chatto and Pickering. ISBN 9781851962853.
