= List of social democratic and democratic socialist parties that have governed =

This is a list of social democratic and democratic socialist parties which have governed countries, whether as the ruling party or as a member of a governing coalition. Most of these parties were members of the Socialist International.

== Political parties ==
Country	Party	Years in power	Member of SI	Notes
Afghanistan	Homeland Party	1990–1992		
Albania	Socialist Party of Albania	2013–present		
Armenia	Armenian Revolutionary Federation		yes	
Australia	Australian Labor Party	1904, 1908–1909, 1910–1913, 1914–1917, 1929–1932, 1941–1949, 1972–1975, 1983–1996, 2007–2013, 2022–present	yes (formerly)	
Austria	Social Democratic Party of Austria	1918–1921, 1945–1966, 1970–2000, 2007–2017, 2025–present	yes (formerly)	
Bangladesh	Bangladesh Awami League	2009–present		
Barbados	Barbados Labour Party	1954–1961, 1976–1986, 1994–2008, 2018–present		
Barbados	Democratic Labour Party	1961–1976, 1986–1994, 2008–2018		
Belgium	Belgian Socialist Party	1938–1939, 1945–1949, 1954–1958, 1973–1974		
Belgium	Parti socialiste	2011–2014		
Bermuda	Progressive Labour Party	1998–2012		
Bolivia	Movement Towards Socialism	2006–2025		
Colombia	Colombian Liberal Party		yes	
Chile	Socialist Party of Chile	1970–1973, 2006–2010, 2014–2018	yes	
Czech Republic	Social Democracy	1998–2006, 2013–2017, 2018–2021	yes	
Czechoslovakia	Social Democracy		yes	
Czechoslovakia	Czech National Social Party		no	
Czechoslovakia	German Social Democratic Workers' Party in the Czechoslovak Republic		no	
Brazil	Brazilian Socialist Party	2002–2014, 2023–present		
Brazil	Socialism and Liberty Party	2023–present		
Brazil	Workers' Party	2003–2016, 2023–present		
Bulgaria	Bulgarian Socialist Party	2002-2012		
Costa Rica	National Liberation Party	1948-1949, 1953-1958, 1962-1966, 1970-1978, 1982-1990, 1994-1998, 2006-2014		
Denmark	Social Democrats (Denmark)	1916–1920, 1924–1926, 1929–1945, 1947–1950, 1953–1968, 1971–1973, 1975–1982, 1993–2001, 2011–2015, 2019–		
Dominica	Dominica Labour Party	1961–1979, 2000–present		
Dominican Republic	Dominican Revolutionary Party	1963, 1978–1986, 2000–2004		
Ecuador	Democratic Left	1988–1992		
Ecuador	PAIS Alliance	2007–2021		
El Salvador	Farabundo Martí National Liberation Front	2009–2019		
Fiji	Fiji Labour Party	1987, 1999–2000		
Finland	Social Democratic Party of Finland	1926–1927, 1937–1959, 1966–1991, 1995–2007, 2011–2015, 2019–2023	yes	
France	French Section of the Workers' International			
France	Socialist Party	1981–1995, 1997–2002, 2012–2017	yes	
Gibraltar	Gibraltar Socialist Labour Party			
Germany	Social Democratic Party of Germany	1918–1925, 1928–1930, 1966–1982, 1998–2009, 2013–present		
Ghana	National Democratic Congress		yes	
Greece	Panhellenic Socialist Movement	1981–1989, 1993–2004, 2009–2012		
Greece	Syriza	2015–2019		
Greenland	Siumut			
Guyana	People's National Congress (Guyana)	2015–present		
Hungary	Hungarian Socialist Party	1994–1998, 2002–2010	yes	
Hungary	Social Democratic Party of Hungary	1918–1919		
Iceland	Social Democratic Alliance	2009–2013	yes	
India	Indian National Congress	1947–1977, 1980–1989, 1991–1996, 2004–2014	yes	
Ireland	Sinn Féin	1919–22		
Israel	Israeli Labor Party	1968–1977, 1984–1990, 1992–1996, 1999–2003, 2006–2011, 2020–2022	yes (formerly)	
Italy	Italian Socialist Party			
Jamaica	People's National Party	1955–1962, 1972–1980, 1989–2007, 2012–2016		
Japan	Japan Socialist Party	1947–1948	yes	
Lebanon	Armenian Revolutionary Federation		yes	
Lebanon	Progressive Socialist Party		yes	
Malta	Labour Party			
Mauritius	Labour Party			
Mauritius	Mauritian Militant Movement			
Mauritius	Militant Socialist Movement			
Mongolia	Mongolian People's Revolutionary Party			
Montenegro	Democratic Party of Socialists of Montenegro			
Morocco	Socialist Union of Popular Forces			
Nepal	Nepali Congress			
Netherlands	Labour	1946, 1948–1958, 1973–1977, 1994–2002		
New Zealand	Labour Party	1935–1949, 1957–1960, 1972–1975, 1984–1990, 1999–2008, 2017–2023	observer	
Niger	Nigerien Party for Democracy and Socialism			
Norway	Labour Party	1928, 1935–1965, 1971–1972, 1973–1981, 1986–1989, 1990–1997, 2000–2001, 2005–2013, 2021–present	observer	
Pakistan	Pakistan People's Party			
Poland	Polish Socialist Party			
Poland	Democratic Left Alliance	1993–1997, 2001–2005		
Poland	New Left	2023–present		
Portugal	Portuguese Socialist Party		no	
Portugal	Socialist Party	1976–1978, 1983–1985, 1995–2002, 2005–2011, 2015–2024	yes	
Saint Kitts and Nevis	Saint Kitts and Nevis Labour Party	1960–1980, 1995–2015, 2022-present		
Saint Lucia	Saint Lucia Labour Party	1960–1964, 1979–1982, 1997–2006, 2011–2016, 2021–present		
Saint Vincent and the Grenadines	Saint Vincent Labour Party	1967–1972, 1974–1984		
Saint Vincent and the Grenadines	Unity Labour Party	2001–2025		
Serbia	Democratic Party	2000–2003, 2008–2012	yes	
Slovakia	Party of the Democratic Left		yes	
Slovakia	Party of Civic Understanding		no	
Slovakia	Direction – Social Democracy	2006–2010, 2012–2020, 2023-present	yes	
Slovakia	Voice – Social Democracy	2023-present	no	
South Africa	African National Congress	1994–present	yes	
Spain	Spanish Socialist Workers' Party	1931–1933, 1936–1939, 1982–1996, 2004–2011, 2018–present	yes	
Sri Lanka	Sri Lanka Freedom Party	1956–1960, 1960–1965, 1970–1977, 1994–2022	no	
Sri Lanka	Janatha Vimukthi Peramuna	2004–2005, 2024–present	no	
Sweden	Swedish Social Democratic Party	1917–1920, 1921–1923, 1924–1926, 1932–1976, 1982–1991, 1994–2006, 2014–2022		
Tanzania	Tanganyika African National Union	1962–1977		
Tanzania	Chama Cha Mapinduzi	1977–present	yes	
Trinidad and Tobago	United National Congress	1995–2001, 2010–2015, 2025-present		
Turkey	Republican People's Party	1923–1950, 1961–1965, 1971–73, 1974, 1977, 1978–1979, 1995–1996		
Turkey	Social Democratic People's Party	1991–1995		
Turkey	Democratic Left Party	1997–2002		
Turkey	Peoples' Democratic Party	2015		
United Kingdom	Labour Party	1915–1922, 1924, 1929–1951, 1964–1970, 1974–1979, 1997–2010, 2024–present	observer	
Uruguay	Socialist Party of Uruguay	2005–present	yes	
Venezuela	Democratic Action	1945–1948, 1959–1969, 1974–1979, 1984–1993		

== Currently represented ==
The following is a list of democratic socialist or partially democratic socialist parties which are currently being represented in the legislature of their country. It does not include democratic socialist parties that are mainly social democratic and are considered to their right within the centre-left.

- indicates a governing party, including as junior coalition partner or providing parliamentary support

Party	Country	Date established	% of popular vote in the latest election	Seats in the legislature (lower chamber if bicameral)
Movement for Socialism	Bolivia	1998	55.10% (2020)	75 / 130 (58%)
Broad Front^{1}	Uruguay	1971	40.49% (2019)	42 / 99 (42%)
Party of Socialists of the Republic of Moldova	Moldova	1997	27.17% (2021)	32 / 101 (32%)
National Unity of Hope^{1}	Guatemala	2002	17.92% (2019)	54 / 160 (34%)
Labour Party^{1}	United Kingdom	1900	33.70% (2024)	404 / 650 (62%)
Scottish National Party^{1}	Scotland	1936	38.18% (2026)	58 / 129 (45%)
Plaid Cymru^{1}	Wales	1925	35.41% (2026)	43 / 96 (45%)
Social Democratic and Labour Party^{1}	Northern Ireland	1970	9.1% (2022)	8 / 90 (9%)
Sinn Féin	Northern Ireland	1905	29% (2022)	27 / 90 (30%)
Sinn Féin	Ireland	1905	24.53% (2020)	37 / 158 (23%)
Syriza^{1}	Greece	2004	17.83% (2023)	47 / 300 (16%)
Farabundo Martí National Liberation Front	El Salvador	1980	6.91% (2021)	4 / 84 (5%)
Inuit Ataqatigiit	Greenland	1976	37.44% (2021)	12 / 31 (39%)
Left-Green Movement	Iceland	1999	12.57% (2021)	6 / 63 (10%)
Democratic Socialist Left	San Marino	2017	16.49% (2019)	10 / 60 (17%)
Party of Socialists and Democrats^{1}	San Marino	2005	13.13% (2019)	8 / 60 (13%)
Guasú Front	Paraguay	2010	11.83% (2018)	6 / 45 (13%)
Peoples' Democratic Party(Entered the 2023 elections from the Peoples' Equality and Democracy Party lists)	Turkey	2012	8.82% (2023)	57 / 600 (10%)
Workers' Party^{1}	Brazil	1980	10.30% (2018)	56 / 513 (11%)
Unidas Podemos	Spain	2016	12.86% (2019)	35 / 350 (10%)
The Left	Slovenia	2014	4.46% (2022)	5 / 90 (6%)
The Left	Germany	2007	4.9% (2021)	39 / 709 (6%)
Socialist Party^{1}	Netherlands	1971	6% (2021)	9 / 150 (6%)
Socialist Party of Serbia^{1}	Serbia	1990	11.79 (2022)	23 / 250 (9%)
Left Alliance	Finland	1990	8.17% (2019)	16 / 200 (8%)
Left Party	Sweden	1917	8.02% (2018)	28 / 349 (8%)
Socialist People's Party	Denmark	1959	7.71% (2019)	14 / 179 (8%)
New Democratic Party^{1}	Canada	1961	6.29% (2025)	7 / 343 (2%)
Red–Green Alliance	Denmark	1989	6.93% (2019)	13 / 179 (7%)
A Just Russia^{1}	Russia	2006	6.34% (2016)	16 / 225 (7%)
Broad Front	Peru	2013	6.18% (2020)	9 / 130 (7%)
Socialist Left	Norway	1975	6.02% (2017)	11 / 169 (7%)
Brazilian Socialist Party	Brazil	1947	5.52% (2018)	31 / 513 (6%)
Democratic Labour Party^{1}	Brazil	1979	4.68% (2018)	28 / 513 (5%)
La France insoumise	France	2016	11.03% (2017)	17 / 577 (3%)
The Left	Luxembourg	1999	5.48% (2018)	2 / 60 (3%)
Socialism and Liberty Party	Brazil	2004	2.85% (2018)	10 / 513 (2%)
Free and Equal^{1}	Italy	2017	3.39% (2018)	14 / 630 (2%)
Movement of Socialist Democrats	Tunisia	1978	1.04% (2019)	1 / 217 (0.5%)
Armenian Revolutionary Federation^{1}	Armenia	1890	3.89% (2018)	0 / 132 (0%)
Workers' Party^{1}	Singapore	1957	14.99% (2025)	10 / 97 (10%)

- ^{1}Parties which are also social democratic.

== See also ==
- List of social democratic parties
- List of democratic socialist parties and organizations
- List of socialist parties with national parliamentary representation
- List of communist parties represented in European Parliament
