= List of social democrats =

This is a partial list of notable social democrats.

== List ==
- C. N. Annadurai
- Anthony Albanese
- Daniel Andrews
- Jacinda Ardern
- Clement Attlee
- Obafemi Awolowo
- Oliver Baldwin
- José Batlle y Ordóñez
- Adam Bandt
- Dr. B. R. Ambedkar
- Gustav Bauer
- Otto Bauer (Classical)
- David Ben-Gurion
- Victor L. Berger
- Ingmar Bergman
- Eduard Bernstein (Classical)
- Zulfikar Ali Bhutto
- Tony Blair
- Robert Blatchford
- Hjalmar Branting
- Ed Broadbent
- Gordon Brown
- Gro Harlem Brundtland
- James Callaghan
- Lázaro Cárdenas
- Francisco de Sá Carneiro
- Carsun Chang
- Chen Gongbo (Classical)
- Ben Chifley
- Helen Clark
- Job Cohen
- Brendan Corish
- Anthony Crosland
- António Costa
- John Curtin
- Hugh Dalton
- Devan Nair
- Richard Di Natale
- Tommy Douglas
- Willem Drees
- Alexander Dubček
- Friedrich Ebert
- Bülent Ecevit
- Friedrich Engels (Classical)
- Tage Erlander
- Tim Farron
- Peter Fraser
- Mette Frederiksen
- Hugh Gaitskell
- Indira Gandhi
- Mahatma Gandhi
- Einar Gerhardsen
- Ciro Gomes
- Mikhail Gorbachev
- Tarja Halonen
- Per Albin Hansson
- Keir Hardie
- Michael Harrington
- Bob Hawke
- Rudolf Hilferding
- Morris Hillquit
- Daniel Hoan
- Sidney Hook
- Christopher Hornsrud
- Ekrem İmamoğlu
- Erdal İnönü
- Thorbjørn Jagland
- Roy Jenkins
- Joshua Benjamin Jeyaretnam
- Anker Jørgensen
- M. Karunanidhi
- Karl Kautsky (Classical)
- Paul Keating
- Charles Kennedy
- Alexander Kerensky
- Anna Kéthly
- Kemal Kılıçdaroğlu
- Tim Klüssendorf
- Martin Luther King Jr.
- Norman Kirk
- Joan Kirner
- Bruno Kreisky
- Wim Kok
- Oskar Lafontaine
- Lai Ching-te
- Ferdinand Lassalle
- Jack Layton
- Vladimir Lenin (Classical)
- René Lévesque
- David Lewis
- Karl Liebknecht (Classical)
- Theodor Liebknecht (Classical)
- Wilhelm Liebknecht (Classical)
- Lim Guan Eng
- Lim Kit Siang
- Paavo Lipponen
- Anthony Loke Siew Fook
- Huey Long
- Low Thia Khiang
- Rosa Luxemburg (Classical)
- Vassos Lyssarides
- Sicco Mansholt
- Julius Martov
- Karl Marx (Classical)
- Malcolm MacDonald
- Ramsay MacDonald
- Dom Mintoff
- Hermann Müller
- Tomiichi Murayama
- Alva Myrdal
- Gunnar Myrdal
- Walter Nash
- Jawaharlal Nehru
- Pietro Nenni
- Johan Nygaardsvold
- Özgür Özel
- Sandro Pertini
- Romano Prodi
- Carlos Alvarado Quesada
- Yitzhak Rabin
- Poul Nyrup Rasmussen
- Walter Reuther
- Maximilien de Robespierre (Radicalism)
- Roh Hoe-chan
- Noe Ramishvili
- Carlo Rosselli
- Bayard Rustin
- Pedro Sanchez
- Giuseppe Saragat
- Michael Joseph Savage
- Philipp Scheidemann
- Willem Schermerhorn
- Helmut Schmidt
- Bill Shorten
- Jóhanna Sigurðardóttir
- Jagmeet Singh
- Pritam Singh
- Mário Soares
- Luis Guillermo Solís
- Kalevi Sorsa
- Paul-Henri Spaak
- Keir Starmer
- Thorvald Stauning
- Jens Stoltenberg
- Tan Pingshan (Classical)
- Frans Timmermans
- Pieter Jelles Troelstra
- Tsai Ing-wen
- Filippo Turati
- Sidney Webb
- Harold Wilson
- Gough Whitlam
- Joop den Uyl
- Shelly Yachimovich
- Frank Zeidler
- Zhang Dongsun
- Noe Zhordania

== Heads of state ==
- François Hollande
- François Mitterrand
- Dilma Rousseff
- Luiz Inácio Lula da Silva
- Vincent Auriol
- Franklin D. Roosevelt

== Heads of government ==
- Anthony Albanese
- Léon Blum
- Willy Brandt
- Andy Burnham
- Bülent Ecevit
- Felipe González
- Chris Hipkins
- Zohran Mamdani
- Olof Palme
- Pedro Sánchez
- José Luis Rodríguez Zapatero

== Legislators ==
- Jean Jaurès
- Alexandria Ocasio-Cortez
- Bernie Sanders
