= List of democratic socialists =

This is a partial list of notable democratic socialists.

== Politicians ==
=== Heads of government ===
- Salvador Allende, President of Chile (1970–1973)
- Jacobo Árbenz, President of Guatemala (1951–1954)
- Clement Attlee, Prime Minister of the United Kingdom (1945–1951)
- Michelle Bachelet, President of Chile (2006–2010; 2014–2018)
- David Ben-Gurion, Prime Minister of Israel (1948–1954; 1955–1963)
- Léon Blum, Prime Minister of France (1936–1937; 1938)
- Willy Brandt, Chancellor of Germany (1969–1974)
- Álvaro Colom, President of Guatemala (2008–2012)
- Alexander Dubček, leader of the Czechoslovak Socialist Republic (1968–1969)
- Peter Fraser, Prime Minister of New Zealand (1940–1949)
- Mauricio Funes, President of El Salvador (2009–2014)
- Mikhail Gorbachev, Soviet leader (1985–1991)
- António Guterres, Prime-Minister of Portugal (1995 - 2002) and Secretary General of the United Nations (2016–present)
- Cheddi Jagan, President of Guyana (1992–1997)
- Norman Kirk, Prime Minister of New Zealand (1972–1974)
- Fernando Lugo, President of Paraguay (2008–2012)
- Ramsay MacDonald, Prime Minister of the United Kingdom (1924; 1929–1935)
- Nelson Mandela, President of South Africa (1994–1999)
- Michael Manley, Prime Minister of Jamaica (1972–1980)
- François Mitterrand, President of France (1981–1995)
- Evo Morales, President of Bolivia (2006–2019)
- José Mujica, President of Uruguay (2010–2015)
- Walter Nash, Prime Minister of New Zealand (1957–1960)
- Jawaharlal Nehru, Prime Minister of India (1947–1964)
- Olof Palme, Prime Minister of Sweden (1969–1976; 1982–1986)
- José Ramos-Horta, President of East Timor (2007–2012; 2022–present)
- Giuseppe Saragat, President of Italy (1964–1971)
- Michael Joseph Savage, Prime Minister of New Zealand (1935–1940)
- Luiz Inácio Lula da Silva, President of Brazil (2003–2011, 2023–present)
- Sutan Sjahrir, Prime Minister of Indonesia (1945–1947)
- Mário Soares, Founder and Leader of the Socialist Party (1973–1986), Prime-Minister of Portugal (1976–1978; 1983–1986) and President of the Portuguese Republic (1986–1996)
- Kalevi Sorsa, Prime Minister of Finland (1972–1975; 1977–1979; 1982–1987)
- Alexis Tsipras, Prime Minister of Greece (2015–2019)
- Tabaré Vázquez, President of Uruguay (2005–2010; 2015–2020)
- Chris Watson, Prime Minister of Australia (1904)
- Harold Wilson, Prime Minister of the United Kingdom (1964–1970; 1974–1976)
- Lionel Jospin, Prime Minister of France (1997–2002)

==== Disputed ====
- Gordon Brown, Prime Minister of the United Kingdom (2007–2010) – disputed
- Hugo Chávez, President of Venezuela (1999–2013) – disputed
- James Callaghan, Prime Minister of the United Kingdom (1976–1979) – disputed
- Rafael Correa, President of Ecuador (2007–2017) – disputed

=== Other politicians ===
- Niki Ashton, member of Parliament of Canada, two time Leadership candidate
- Obafemi Awolowo, Premier of the Western State of Nigeria (1954–1960)
- Tony Benn, member of the Labour Party and founder of the Socialist Campaign Group
- Eduard Bernstein, member of the Social Democratic Party of Germany
- Aneurin Bevan, father of the National Health Service
- Louis Blanc, member of the French Provisional Government of 1848
- Lee J. Carter, member of the Virginia House of Delegates
- Alexandre Boulerice, deputy leader of the NDP, member of parliament of Canada
- Jeremy Corbyn, leader of the Labour Party and Leader of the Opposition
- Anthony Crosland, member of the Labour Party
- Eugene V. Debs, five-time Socialist Party of America presidential candidate
- Tommy Douglas, father of Medicare
- Evan Durbin, member of the Labour Party
- Michael Foot, leader of the Labour Party and Leader of the Opposition
- Peter Hain, member of the Labour Party
- Joel Harden, member of the Ontario Provincial Parliament.
- Michael Harrington, founder of the Democratic Socialists of America
- Denis Healey, member of the Labour Party
- Karl Kautsky, member of the Social Democratic Party of Germany
- Neil Kinnock, leader of the Labour Party and Leader of the Opposition
- Kevin Kühnert, member of the Social Democratic Party of Germany
- Ferdinand Lassalle, founder of the General German Workers' Association
- Ken Livingstone, Mayor of London (2000–2008)
- Pierre-Joseph Proudhon, member of the French Parliament in 1848
- Alexandria Ocasio-Cortez, New York Representative
- Bernie Sanders, Senator from Vermont
- Kshama Sawant, Seattle City Council member
- Norman Thomas, six-time Socialist Party of America presidential candidate
- Rashida Tlaib, Michigan Representative
- Jean-Luc Mélenchon, French presidential candidate
- Zohran Mamdani, Mayor of New York City

== Intellectuals and activists ==
- Edward Bellamy, American author, journalist and political activist
- Fred Hampton, American activist and chairman of the Black Panther Party
- Étienne Cabet, French philosopher and utopian socialist
- Dr. B. R. Ambedkar, Indian polymath
- Jim Cornette, American professional wrestling personality and manager
- Milovan Đilas, Yugoslav communist politician and dissident
- Barbara Ehrenreich, American author and political activist
- Albert Einstein, German-born theoretical physicist
- Friedrich Engels, German philosopher and sociologist
- Erich Fromm, Jewish German philosopher
- Charles Fourier, French philosopher and utopian socialist
- Henry George, American social reformer
- Charles Hall, British physician, social critic and Ricardian socialist
- Christopher Hitchens, English-American journalist
- Owen Jones, English journalist and political commentator
- Helen Keller, American political activist
- Martin Luther King Jr., African-American civil rights leader
- Naomi Klein, Canadian author and social activist
- Leszek Kołakowski, Polish philosopher and communist dissident
- Rosa Luxemburg, Polish philosopher and economist
- Karl Marx, German philosopher, sociologist and economist
- John Stuart Mill, British philosopher and economist
- George Orwell, English novelist
- Robert Owen, Welsh social reformer and utopian socialist
- Thomas Paine, English-born American philosopher and political theorist
- Bertrand Russell, British philosopher
- Andrei Sakharov, Soviet physicist, dissident and human rights activist
- Henri de Saint-Simon, French political and economic utopian socialist theorist
- Roger Waters, English musician
- Cornel West, American philosopher and political activist
- Richard D. Wolff, American economist
- Howard Zinn, American historian

== See also ==
- List of Democratic Socialists of America members who have held office in the United States
