= SDP =

SDP or sdp may refer to:

== Computing ==
- Scenario Design Power, a power level mode of certain generations of Intel's mobile processors
- Semidefinite programming, an optimization procedure
- Service data point, a node in mobile telecommunication networks
- Service delivery platform, a mobile telecommunications component
- Service Design Package (ITIL), the repository of all design information for a service in ITIL
- Service discovery protocol, a type of service discovery for network services
- Session Description Protocol, a communication protocol for describing multimedia sessions
- Single-dealer platform, software used in financial trading
- Sockets Direct Protocol, a low-level remote-computing protocol
- Software-defined perimeter, a method of enhancing computer security

== Music ==
- Stephen Dale Petit (born 1969), American blues musician
- Scha Dara Parr, a Japanese hip-hop group
- Stuart Price (born 1977), British music producer who occasionally remixes under the moniker SDP
- SDP (duo), a German pop/hip-hop duo

== Organizations ==
=== Political parties ===
- Social Democratic Party, a list of parties with this name
- Socialist Democratic Party (disambiguation)

==== Europe ====
- Social Democratic Party (Andorra)
- Social Democratic Party of Bosnia and Herzegovina
- Social Democratic Party of Croatia
- Social Democratic Party of Finland
- Social Democratic Party of Germany
- Social Democratic Party in the GDR
- Sudeten German Party (German: Sudetendeutsche Partei)
- Social Democratic Party (Latvia)
- Social Democratic Party of Montenegro
- Social Democratic Party (Serbia, 2002)
- Social Democratic Party (UK)
- Social Democratic Party (UK, 1988–1990)
- Social Democratic Party (UK, 1990–present)
- Socialist Democratic Party (Turkey)

==== Elsewhere ====
- Social Democratic Party of America
- Socialist Democratic Party (Chile)
- Social Democratic Party (Japan)
- Social Democratic Party (New Zealand)
- Socialist Democrat Party, Peru
- Singapore Democratic Party
- Surinamese Democratic Party
- Communist Party of Kenya, formerly known as the Social Democratic Party of Kenya

=== Other organizations ===
- School District of Philadelphia
- Society of Decorative Painters
- Stardust Pictures, a film studio, operating as a subsidiary of Stardust Promotion

== Transportation ==
- Sand Point Airport (IATA code: SDP), in the Aleutian Islands, Alaska, US
- Sandplace railway station (National Rail code: SDP), Cornwall, UK
- Stoomtrein Dendermonde-Puurs (Dendermonde–Puurs Steam Railway), a heritage railway in Belgium

== Other uses ==
- San Diego Padres, American professional baseball team
- Sherdukpen language (ISO 639-3 code: sdp), spoken in Arunachal Pradesh, India
- State Domestic Product, in economics
- Substantive due process, legal principal in the US

== See also ==
- Democratic Socialist Party (disambiguation)
- DSP (disambiguation)
- Party of Democratic Socialism (disambiguation)
- PDS (disambiguation)
- Socialist Democratic Party (Canada) (PDS)
- Social Democratic Party (Serbia) (SDS), 2014-
- Social Democratic Party of Serbia (SDPS)
- SPD (disambiguation)
- "SDP Interlude", a song by Travis Scott from Birds in the Trap Sing McKnight
