= List of socialist parties =

Socialist Party is the name of many different political parties around the world, mainly used by parties on the Center-left to Far-left spectrum. The list of parties using the exact name "Socialist Party" is to be found in the Socialist Party article.

Socialist Party may also refer to the wide variety of political parties that use the word "Socialist" in their names, often in conjunction with other adjectives and political labels. What follows is an incomplete alphabetical list of such parties:

== Names used by several different parties ==
- Arab Socialist Ba'ath Party (disambiguation)
- Authentic Socialist Party (disambiguation)
- Democratic Socialist Party (disambiguation)
- Independent Socialist Party (disambiguation)
- National Socialist Party (disambiguation)
- New Socialist Party (disambiguation)
- Polish Socialist Party (disambiguation)
- Popular Socialist Party (disambiguation)
- Revolutionary Socialist Party (disambiguation)
- Socialist Action Party (disambiguation)
- Socialist Democratic Party (disambiguation)
- Socialist Labour Party (disambiguation)
- Socialist People's Party (disambiguation)
- Socialist Republican Party (disambiguation)
- Socialist Unity (disambiguation)
- Socialist Unity Party (disambiguation)
- Socialist Workers Party (disambiguation)
- Unified or Unitary or United Socialist Party (disambiguation)

== Africa ==
=== Egypt ===
- Egyptian Arab Socialist Party
- Egyptian Socialist Party
- Liberal Socialists Party
- Socialist Party of Egypt
- Socialist Popular Alliance Party

=== Other African countries ===
- Liberal Socialist Party (Angola), Angola
- Burkinabé Socialist Party, Burkina Faso
- Party for Democracy and Progress / Socialist Party, Burkina Faso
- Gabonese Socialist Party, Gabon
- Socialist Party of Guinea, Guinea
- Socialist Party of Guinea-Bissau, Guinea-Bissau
- Party of the Unified Socialist Left, Morocco
- Socialist Party (Morocco), Morocco
- Socialist Workers and Farmers Party of Nigeria, Nigeria
- Rwandese Socialist Party, Rwanda
- Senegalese Socialist Party, Senegal
- Socialist Party of Senegal, Senegal
- Socialist Party of Azania, South Africa
- Islamic Socialist Party, Sudan
- Pan-African Socialist Party, Togo
- Socialist Destourian Party, Tunisia
- Socialist Party, Tunisia
- Zairian Socialist Party, Zaire

== Asia ==
=== Iraq ===
- Assyrian Socialist Party

=== India ===
- Congress Socialist Party
- French India Socialist Party
- Kerala Socialist Party
- Mahe Socialist Party
- Praja Socialist Party
- Punjab Socialist Party
- Samyukta Socialist Party
- Socialist Janata (Democratic) Party
- Socialist Party (India, 1948)
- Socialist Party of India (1955)
- Socialist Party (India, 1971)
- Socialist Party (India, 2011)
- Socialist Party (Marxist)
- Socialist Unity Centre of India (Communist)
- West Bengal Socialist Party
- World Socialist Party of India

=== Sri Lanka ===
- Communist Party of Sri Lanka
- Frontline Socialist Party
- Janatha Vimukthi Peramuna
- Socialist Party of Sri Lanka
- Sri Lanka Freedom Socialist Party

=== Japan ===
- Leftist Socialist Party of Japan
- Okinawa Social Mass Party
- Rightist Socialist Party of Japan

=== Turkey ===
- Ottoman Socialist Party
- Revolutionary Communist Party of Turkey – Socialist Unity
- Socialist Democracy Party
- Turkish Workers and Peasants Socialist Party

=== Other Asian countries ===
- Socialist Party of Bangladesh, Bangladesh
- Socialist Party of Bangladesh (Marxist), Bangladesh
- Burma Socialist Party, Burma
- Burma Socialist Programme Party, Burma
- Socialist Party (Iran), Iran
- Nasserist Socialist Vanguard Party, Iraq
- Ata Meken Socialist Party, Kyrgyzstan
- Progressive Socialist Party, Lebanon
- Socialist Party of Malaysia, Malaysia
- Nepal Samata Party (Socialist), Nepal
- Pakistan Socialist Party, Pakistan
- Socialist Party (South Korea), South Korea
- Socialist Cooperation Party, Syria
- Socialist Party of Tajikistan, Tajikistan
- Socialist Party of Thailand, Thailand
- Socialist Party of Vietnam, Vietnam
- Yemeni Socialist Party, Yemen

== Europe ==
- Group of the Party of European Socialists
- International Working Union of Socialist Parties
- Party of European Socialists

=== Belgium ===
- Belgian Socialist Party
- Workers' Party of Belgium
- Socialist Party (Belgium)
- Socialist Party Different
- Left Socialist Party (Belgium)
- Republican Socialist Party

=== France ===
- French Socialist Party (1902)
- French Socialist Party (1919)
- Radical-Socialist Party Camille Pelletan
- Republican-Socialist Party
- Socialist Party (France)
- Socialist Party of France – Jean Jaurès Union
- Socialist Party of France (1902)
- Socialist Revolutionary Party (France)
- Workers and Peasants' Socialist Party

=== Ireland ===
- Cork Socialist Party
- Socialist Party (Ireland)
- Socialist Party of Ireland (1971)

=== Iceland ===
- Icelandic Socialist Party
- People's Unity Party – Socialist Party

=== Italy ===
- Italian Reformist Socialist Party
- Italian Socialist Party
- Italian Socialist Party (2007)
- Italian Socialist Party of Proletarian Unity
- New Italian Socialist Party
- Reformist Socialist Party
- Socialist Party (Italy, 1996)

=== Netherlands ===
- Pacifist Socialist Party
- Socialist Party (Netherlands)
- Socialist Party (Netherlands, interbellum)

=== Portugal ===
- Portuguese Socialist Party
- Socialist Party (Portugal)
- Workers Party of Socialist Unity

=== Romania ===
- Romanian Socialist Party
- Socialist Alliance Party
- Socialist Party of Labour
- Socialist Party of Romania

=== Russia ===
- Socialist Party
- United Socialist Party of Russia

=== San Marino ===
- Party of Socialists and Democrats
- Sammarinese Independent Democratic Socialist Party
- Sammarinese Reformist Socialist Party
- Sammarinese Socialist Party
- New Socialist Party (San Marino)
- Socialist Party (San Marino)

=== Spain ===
- Radical Socialist Republican Party
- Socialist Canarian Party
- Socialist Party of the People of Ceuta
- Socialist Party of Catalonia-Congress
- Socialist Party of Majorca
- Socialist Party of the Basque Country–Basque Country Left
- Socialist Party of the Islands
- Socialist Party of the Valencian Country
- Socialists' Party of Catalonia
- Socialists' Party of Galicia
- Valencian Socialist Party

=== Sweden ===
- Left Socialist Party (Sweden)
- Socialist Justice Party
- Socialist Party (Sweden, 1929)
- Socialist Party (Sweden, 1971)

=== United Kingdom ===
- British Socialist Party
- Socialist Party (England and Wales)
- Socialist Party of Great Britain
- Workers Party of Britain
- Your Party

==== Scotland ====
- Scottish Republican Socialist Party
- Scottish Socialist Party
- Scottish Socialist Party United Left
- Socialist Party Scotland

==== Other United Kingdom countries ====
- Irish Republican Socialist Party, Northern Ireland

=== Other European countries ===
- Albanian Socialist Alliance Party, Albania
- Socialist Party of Albania, Albania
- Belarusian Socialist Sporting Party, Belarus
- Socialist Party (Bosnia and Herzegovina), Bosnia and Herzegovina
- Bulgarian Social Democratic Workers' Party (Broad Socialists), Bulgaria
- Bulgarian Socialist Party, Bulgaria
- Provincial Christian-Socialist Party, Czechoslovakia
- Socialist Party of the Czechoslovak Working People, Czechoslovakia
- Serbian Party of Socialists (Croatia), Croatia
- Socialist Party of Croatia, Croatia
- Georgian Socialist-Federalist Revolutionary Party, Georgia
- German Socialist Party, Germany
- Socialist Reich Party, Germany
- Fighting Socialist Party of Greece, Greece
- Socialist Party of Greece, Greece
- Hungarian Socialist Party, Hungary
- Socialist Party of Latvia, Latvia
- Socialist Workers and Peasants Party of Latvia, Latvia
- Socialist Party (Lithuania), Lithuania
- Socialist Party of Lithuania, Lithuania
- Radical Socialist Party (Luxembourg), Luxembourg
- Socialist Party of Macedonia, Macedonia
- Party of Socialists of the Republic of Moldova, Moldova
- Socialist Party of Moldova, Moldova
- Democratic Party of Socialists of Montenegro, Montenegro
- People's Socialist Party of Montenegro, Montenegro
- Socialist Left Party, Norway
- Silesian Socialist Party, Poland
- Socialist Party of Serbia, Serbia
- Socialist Party of Slovenia, Slovenia
- Progressive Socialist Party of Ukraine, Ukraine
- Socialist Party of Ukraine, Ukraine
- Socialist Party of Yugoslavia, Yugoslavia
- Socialist Party of Yugoslavia (2002), Yugoslavia

== North America ==
=== Canada ===
==== National ====
- New Democratic Party Socialist Caucus
- Socialist Party of Canada
- Socialist Party of Canada (WSM)
- United Canadian Socialist Party
- Socialist Party of North America
- World Socialist Party of Canada

==== Local ====
- Socialist Party of Alberta, Alberta
- Socialist Party of Canada (British Columbia), British Columbia
- Socialist Party of Canada (Manitoba), Manitoba
- Socialist Party of Ontario, Ontario

=== Cuba ===
- Cuban Socialist Party
- Socialist Party of Manzanillo
- Socialist Party of the Island of Cuba

=== United States ===
==== National ====
- African People's Socialist Party
- Freedom Socialist Party
- Left Wing Section of the Socialist Party
- Party for Socialism and Liberation
- Socialist Party of America
- Socialist Party USA
- Socialist Union Party
- World Socialist Party of the United States

==== Local ====
- Socialist Party of California, California
- Socialist Party of Colorado, Colorado
- Socialist Party of Connecticut, Connecticut
- Socialist Party of Florida, Florida
- Chicago Socialist Party, Illinois
- Socialist Party of Kansas, Kansas
- Socialist Party of Massachusetts, Massachusetts
- Socialist Party of Michigan, Michigan
- Socialist Party of Minnesota, Minnesota
- Socialist Party of New Jersey, New Jersey
- Socialist Party of New York, New York
- Socialist Party of Ohio, Ohio
- Socialist Party of Oklahoma, Oklahoma
- Socialist Party of Oregon, Oregon
- Puerto Rican Socialist Party, Puerto Rico
- Socialist Party (Puerto Rico), Puerto Rico
- Socialist Party of Texas, Texas
- Socialist Party of Washington, Washington
- Socialist Party of Wisconsin, Wisconsin

=== Other North American countries ===
- Vanguard Nationalist and Socialist Party, Bahamas
- Socialist Party (Guatemala), Guatemala
- Mexican Socialist Party, Mexico
- Socialist Party of Mexico, Mexico
- Socialist Party (Panama), Panama
- Workers' Socialist Party (Panama), Panama
- Caribbean Socialist Party, Trinidad and Tobago
- Trades Union Congress and Socialist Party, Trinidad and Tobago

== Oceania ==
=== Indonesia ===
- Socialist Party (Indonesia)
- Socialist Party of Indonesia
- Socialist Party of Indonesia (Parsi)

=== Other countries in Oceania ===
- Socialist Party (Australia), Australia
- Victorian Socialist Party, Australia
- Socialist Party of Timor, East Timor
- New Zealand Socialist Party, New Zealand
- World Socialist Party (New Zealand), New Zealand
- Liberal Socialist Party, Singapore

== South America ==
=== Argentina ===
- Argentine Socialist Vanguard Party
- Socialist Party (Argentina)
- Socialist Party of the National Left

=== Bolivia ===
- Socialist Party (Bolivia, 1971)
- Socialist Party-1
- Workers Socialist Party of Bolivia

=== Peru ===
- Socialist Democrat Party
- Socialist Party (Peru)
- Socialist Party of Peru (1930)
- Socialist Vanguard Party

=== Other South American countries ===
- Brazilian Socialist Party, Brazil
- Socialist Party of Chile, Chile
- Socialist Party – Broad Front of Ecuador, Ecuador
- Guianese Socialist Party, French Guiana
- Nicaraguan Socialist Party, Nicaragua
- Nicaraguan Socialist Party (de los Sánchez), Nicaragua
- Socialist Party of Uruguay, Uruguay

== See also ==
- Democratic Socialist Party (disambiguation)
- Socialist Labour Party (disambiguation)
- Socialist People's Party (disambiguation)
- Socialist Workers Party (disambiguation)
