= Socialist Democratic Party =

Socialist Democratic Party may refer to:

- Kurdistan Socialist Democratic Party
- Lithuanian Popular Socialist Democratic Party
- Mongolian New Socialist Democratic Party
- Russian Socialist Democratic Party
- Socialist Democratic Party (Canada)
- Socialist Democratic Party (Chile)
- Socialist Democratic Party (Japan)
- Socialist Democratic Party (Turkey)
- Socialist Democratic Party (India)
- Social Democratic Party of Germany
- Social Democratic Party in the GDR
- Social Democratic Party (Bosnia and Herzegovina)
- Social Democratic Party (Croatia)

== See also ==
- Democratic Socialist Party (disambiguation)
- Social Democratic Party
- List of socialist parties
- Party of Democratic Socialism (disambiguation)
- Socialist Democrat Party, Peru
- Socialists and Democrats (disambiguation)
