= Popular socialism =

Topics referred to by the same term

Popular socialism may refer to:

- Popular socialism (Nordic countries)
- Popular socialism (Central Europe)

== See also ==
- Left-wing populism
- Left wing nationalism
- Popular Socialist Party
- People's Socialist Party
