= Social Democrats =

Social Democrats is a name used by a number of political parties in various countries around the world. Such parties are most commonly aligned to social democracy.

Social Democrats may refer to:

- Social Democrats (Croatia), a social-democratic political party in Croatia
- Social Democrats (Denmark), a social-democratic political party in Denmark
- Social Democrats (Germany), a social-democratic political party in Germany
- Social Democrats (Ireland), a centre-left political party in Ireland
- Social Democrats (Slovenia), a centre-left political party in Slovenia
- Social Democrats (Sweden), a social-democratic political party in Sweden
- Social Democrats, USA, a small association of democratic socialists and social democrats in the United States
- Social Democrats of Uganda, a political party in Uganda
- Åland Social Democrats, a social-democratic political party on the Åland Islands
- Gibraltar Social Democrats, a liberal-conservative, centre-right political party in Gibraltar
- Portuguese Social Democrats, a liberal-conservative political party in Portugal
- Social Democrats of Montenegro, a centre-left political party in Montenegro
- Supporters of social democracy in general
- Various parties using the name Social Democratic Party

== See also ==
- List of social democratic parties, parties that consider themselves to uphold social democracy
- Social Democracy (disambiguation)
- Social-Demokraten (disambiguation)
- Socialists and Democrats (disambiguation)
