= July 1940 =

Month of 1940

<<	July 1940					>>
Su	Mo	Tu	We	Th	Fr	Sa
	1	2	3	4	5	6
7	8	9	10	11	12	13
14	15	16	17	18	19	20
21	22	23	24	25	26	27
28	29	30	31

The following events occurred in July 1940:

== July 1, 1940 (Monday) ==
- Philippe Pétain's government moved to Vichy. The collaborationist state run from there came to be known as Vichy France.
- First Luftwaffe daylight bombing raid on mainland Britain at Wick, Caithness: 15 civilians, 8 of them children, were killed.
- Admiral James Somerville took command of Force H.
- The Mitsubishi A6M Zero fighter plane entered operation in the Imperial Japanese Navy.
- The British government advised women to conserve wood by wearing shoes with flatter heels.
- Tacoma Narrows Bridge opened in Washington, the third-longest suspension bridge in the world at the time of construction.
- Died: Ben Turpin, 70, American comedian and actor

== July 2, 1940 (Tuesday) ==
- U.S. Congress enacted the Export Control Act, granting the president authority to restrict the export of goods that had military applications such as machine parts, munitions and tools.
- The passenger ship Arandora Star was heading for Canada transporting German and Italian internees and prisoners of war when she was torpedoed and sunk west of Ireland by German submarine U-47. 865 lives were lost.
- Born: Christopher Awdry, author, in Ampfield, England

== July 3, 1940 (Wednesday) ==
- Attack on Mers-el-Kébir: The British attacked the French Navy base in French Algeria to ensure that the Vichy French government would not turn the fleet over to the Germans.
- Cardiff Blitz: the first German air raid on Cardiff, Wales took place.
- Exiled Ethiopian Emperor Haile Selassie arrived in Khartoum from Britain to prepare for the reconquest of his country from the Italians with Britain's help.
- Born: Fontella Bass, R&B soul singer, in St. Louis, Missouri (d. 2012); César Tovar, baseball player, in Caracas, Venezuela (d. 1994)

== July 4, 1940 (Thursday) ==
- Italian forces in Eritrea crossed the Sudanese border and occupied a number of British forts, including Kassala.
- The series of air battles over the English Channel known as the Kanalkampf began.
- French bombers attacked Gibraltar. Although no damage was done, the British would evacuate women and children from the area later that month.
- Winston Churchill expressed "sincere sorrow" as he delivered a speech to the House of Commons explaining "the measures which we have felt bound to take in order to prevent the French Fleet from falling into German hands."
- Norwegian figure skating star Sonja Henie married Brooklyn Dodgers football team executive Dan Topping in Chicago.
- The drama film All This, and Heaven Too starring Bette Davis and Charles Boyer was released.
- Died: Jack Foreman Mantle, 23, English sailor and recipient of the Victoria Cross (killed in action in Portland Harbour)

== July 5, 1940 (Friday) ==
- Vichy France severed diplomatic relations with Britain over the attack on Mers-el-Kébir.
- Operation Fish: A British convoy including HMS Batory sailed from Greenock (Scotland) for Halifax, Nova Scotia, carrying gold bar and other valuables worth $1.7 billion for safe keeping in Canada, the largest movement of wealth in history.
- Died: Carl Einstein, 55, German Jewish writer (suicide)

== July 6, 1940 (Saturday) ==
- Adolf Hitler returned to Berlin in triumph.
- The first U-boat base in France became operational at Lorient.
- Plymouth Blitz: The English city of Plymouth was bombed for the first time.
- Story Bridge opened in Brisbane, Australia.
- Born: Nursultan Nazarbayev, 1st President of Kazakhstan, in Chemolgan, Kazakh SSR, Soviet Union

== July 7, 1940 (Sunday) ==
- Italy granted permission to the French to keep their Mediterranean bases armed.
- General elections were held in Mexico. Manuel Ávila Camacho was elected president, claiming 93.9% of the vote.
- Born: Ringo Starr, drummer for The Beatles, in Dingle, Liverpool, England

== July 8, 1940 (Monday) ==
- British torpedo bombers attacked the French battleship Richelieu at Dakar, inflicting damage but failing to sink their target.
- Sweden and Germany signed an agreement allowing the transit of German materiel to pass between Norway and ports in southern Sweden.

== July 9, 1940 (Tuesday) ==
- The Battle of Calabria was fought in the Mediterranean Sea off the coast of Italy. It ended indecisively.
- The Duke of Windsor was appointed Governor of the Bahamas.
- The British House of Commons unanimously passed a £1 billion war credit.
- U.S. President Franklin D. Roosevelt held a press conference in which he continued to skillfully dodge questions about whether or not he was seeking the Democratic nomination for a third term at next week's convention.
- The National League blanked the American League 4–0 in the 8th Major League Baseball All-Star Game at Sportsman's Park in St. Louis.
- Died: Józef Biniszkiewicz, 65, Silesian socialist politician (died in Buchenwald concentration camp)

== July 10, 1940 (Wednesday) ==
- The Battle of Britain began. In its opening phase the Luftwaffe attacked coastal targets and shipping convoys in the English Channel with the goal of reducing Britain's air defences and naval supply lines ahead of a general air offensive.
- The French National Assembly voted 569–80 to give plenary power to the Vichy government. Philippe Pétain assumed authoritarian powers.
- The British Union of Fascists was banned.
- Henry L. Stimson became the new United States Secretary of War.
- Born: Gene Alley, baseball player, in Richmond, Virginia; Helen Donath, soprano, in Corpus Christi, Texas; Tom Farmer, entrepreneur, in Leith, Edinburgh, Scotland

== July 11, 1940 (Thursday) ==
- Romania quit the League of Nations.
- Marshal Pétain abrogated Article 2 of the French Constitutional Laws of 1875 which provided for the position of a President elected by the National Assembly.
- British Under-Secretary of State for Foreign Affairs Rab Butler confirmed in the House of Commons that the exiled Ethiopian government of Haile Selassie was to be recognized as an ally of Britain and that Ethiopia's independence would be restored after the war was won.

== July 12, 1940 (Friday) ==
- Pierre Laval was appointed Vice Premier of Vichy France and Marshal Pétain's successor.

== July 13, 1940 (Saturday) ==
- Italian forces crossed the border from Ethiopia into Kenya and attacked the British garrison of Moyale.
- Born: Paul Prudhomme, celebrity chef, in Opelousas, Louisiana (d. 2015); Patrick Stewart, actor, in Mirfield, England (d. 2026)

== July 14, 1940 (Sunday) ==
- Rigged elections began in Soviet-occupied Estonia, Latvia and Lithuania.
- Bastille Day in the unoccupied portion of France was observed solemnly with flags at half mast.
- General elections were held in Cuba. Fulgencio Batista was elected president.
- Winston Churchill gave a radio address declaring that Britain would fight on alone, saying that "be the ordeal sharp or long, or both, we shall seek no terms, we shall tolerate no parley; we may show mercy-we shall ask for none."

== July 15, 1940 (Monday) ==
- The 1940 Democratic National Convention opened in Chicago.
- The first German air raid of the Brighton Blitz occurred.
- The results of the rigged elections in the Soviet-occupied Baltic states were announced, reporting an almost unanimous desire to join the Soviet Union.
- The British withdrew from Moyale.
- Alsace and Lorraine were effectively annexed by Germany. Although Germany had not formally re-annexed the old territory of Alsace-Lorraine from France in June's armistice treaty, the moving of the customs line between the two countries to the old pre-World War I frontiers effectively served as de facto annexation.
- Died: Robert Wadlow, 22, tallest person in recorded history (infection)

== July 16, 1940 (Tuesday) ==
- Hitler issued Directive No. 16, authorizing Operation Sea Lion.
- The Japanese cabinet resigned.
- Vichy France revoked the French citizenship of naturalized Jews.
- Jews in the Alsatian city of Colmar were pushed across the new border into France.
- Francoist Spain broke off diplomatic relations with Chile.

== July 17, 1940 (Wednesday) ==
- The British government announced that the Burma Road would be closed to concentrate on the war at home.
- Vichy France passed a law forbidding employment to those not born of French parents.
- Born: Tim Brooke-Taylor, comic actor, in Buxton, Derbyshire, England (d. 2020); Verne Lundquist, sportscaster, in Duluth, Minnesota
- Died: Werner Scholem, 44, German Communist politician (executed at Buchenwald concentration camp)

== July 18, 1940 (Thursday) ==
- Franklin D. Roosevelt was nominated almost unanimously at the Democratic National Convention to run for an unprecedented third term as President of the United States. Henry A. Wallace of Iowa was selected as Roosevelt's running mate.
- RAF Bomber Command conducted night raids on the Krupp armament works at Essen as well as Bremen and Hamm.
- The musical comedy film The Boys from Syracuse premiered in Syracuse, New York.
- Born: James Brolin, actor, producer and director, in Los Angeles, California; Joe Torre, baseball player, manager and executive, in Brooklyn, New York

== July 19, 1940 (Friday) ==
- The Field Marshal Ceremony was held at the Kroll Opera House in Berlin. Hermann Göring was promoted to Reichsmarschall.
- Hitler made a speech to the Reichstag reviewing the course of the war and then warned, "Mr. Churchill, or perhaps others, for once believe me when I predict a great empire will be destroyed, an empire that it was never my intention to destroy or even to harm. I do realize that this struggle, if it continues, can end only with the complete annihilation of one or the other of the two adversaries. Mr. Churchill may believe this will be Germany. I know that it will be Britain." Hitler then appealed "once more to reason and common sense", saying, "I can see no reason why this war must go on." He said if Churchill brushed aside this appeal, "I shall have relieved my conscience in regard to the things to come." BBC German-language broadcaster Sefton Delmer unofficially rejected it at once.
- Roosevelt gave his acceptance speech to the Democratic National Convention. The president listed his reasons for running again and stated, "my conscience will not let me turn my back upon a call to service. The right to make that call rests with the people, through the American method of a free election. Only the people themselves can draft a President. If such a draft should be made upon me, I say to you, in the utmost simplicity, I will, with God's help, continue to serve with the best of my ability and with the fullness of my strength."
- The Battle of Cape Spada was fought in the Mediterranean Sea, resulting in Allied victory. The Italians lost their large ship of the war, the light cruiser Bartolomeo Colleoni.
- General Sir Alan Brooke was made Commander-in-Chief, Home Forces.
- Dornier Do 17 bombers conducted a night raid on the Rolls-Royce aero engine factory at Glasgow.
- The United States enacted the Two-Ocean Navy Act.
- Born: Vikki Carr, singer, in El Paso, Texas

== July 20, 1940 (Saturday) ==
- Jean Decoux became Governor-General of French Indochina.
- The British government banned the buying and selling of new cars.
- Born: David Jemibewon, Nigerian Army major general, in Iyah-Gbedde, Ijumu, Colonial Nigeria

== July 21, 1940 (Sunday) ==
- The Estonian, Latvian and Lithuanian Soviet Socialist Republics were established.
- Hitler directed Walther von Brauchitsch to advise him on the feasibility of an attack on the Soviet Union in the autumn of 1940.
- The Special Operations Executive was created in the United Kingdom.

== July 22, 1940 (Monday) ==
- The Havana Conference was held.
- Fumimaro Konoe became Prime Minister of Japan for the second time.
- Born: Alex Trebek, television game show host, in Sudbury, Ontario, Canada (d. 2020)

== July 23, 1940 (Tuesday) ==
- The Welles Declaration was issued, in which the United States refused to recognize the Soviet annexation of the Baltic states.
- Chancellor of the Exchequer Sir Kingsley Wood introduced Britain's third war budget. A 24 percent tax was imposed on luxuries.
- The Local Defence Volunteers organization was renamed the Home Guard at Churchill's suggestion.
- Joseph Louis Anne Avenol announced his intention to resign as Secretary-General of the League of Nations.

== July 24, 1940 (Wednesday) ==
- The French passenger liner Meknés departed Southampton for Marseille for repatriation of the 1,277 captured French Navy sailors aboard. The ship was torpedoed in the English Channel by the German torpedo boat S-27 despite the Meknés' displays of neutrality. Four British destroyers rescued the survivors but 416 perished.
- A federal grand jury in Los Angeles indicted 24 members of the "I AM" Movement for mail fraud.
- German submarine U-139 was commissioned.
- Born: Stanley Hauerwas, theologian, ethicist and public intellectual, in Dallas, Texas

== July 25, 1940 (Thursday) ==
- A British coal convoy took heavy losses from German dive bombers. The Admiralty ordered future convoys to take place at night as a result.
- Died: Julia Gulliver, 83, American philosopher, educator and college president

== July 26, 1940 (Friday) ==
- President Roosevelt used the Export Control Act to restrict the export of aviation gasoline and certain types of scrap metal to Japan without special license.
- The historical romantic drama film Pride and Prejudice was released.
- Born: Mary Jo Kopechne, political campaign specialist and aide to Ted Kennedy, in Wilkes-Barre, Pennsylvania (d. 1969)

== July 27, 1940 (Saturday) ==
- The British destroyer Codrington was bombed and sunk in Dover by the Germans.
- This week's issue of Billboard magazine began publishing a top ten list of the best-selling retail records in the United States. The first official #1 single in Billboard history was "I'll Never Smile Again" by Tommy Dorsey and His Orchestra.
- According to a Japanese Foreign Affairs Ministry official report, Melville James Cox and ten other British citizens were arrested on suspicion of military espionage by Japanese military police in six Japanese cities. Two days later, Cox committed suicide by jumping from a window of his prison in Tokyo.
- Bugs Bunny made his debut in the animated short, A Wild Hare.
- Born: Pina Bausch, dancer and ballet director, in Solingen, Germany (d. 2009); Bharati Mukherjee, Indian-born American writer and professor emerita, in Calcutta, British India (d. 2017)

== July 28, 1940 (Sunday) ==
- President Jozef Tiso, Prime Minister Vojtech Tuka and Hlinka Guard leader Alexander Mach of the Slovak Republic met with Hitler at the Berghof. Hitler demanded that "Slovakia should adhere loyally and unequivocally to the German cause in her domestic politics.".
- German fighter ace Werner Mölders was wounded in the legs by enemy fire during the Battle of Britain but managed to return to base at Wissant. Mölders spent the next month recovering in a hospital.

== July 29, 1940 (Monday) ==
- German naval command issued a memo noting that the mid-September 1940 date for an invasion of Britain as demanded by Hitler was possible, but recommended a postponement to May 1941.
- Hitler told the military commander Alfred Jodl that the planned attack on the Soviet Union in the fall of 1940 was no longer logistically feasible and that it would be postponed to spring 1941.
- Born: Bernard Lafayette, civil rights leader, in Tampa, Florida

== July 30, 1940 (Tuesday) ==
- 21 nations of the Americas signed the Act of Havana, providing for an emergency establishment of a provisional administration "when islands or regions of the Americas now under the possession of non-American nations are in danger of becoming the subject of barter of territory or change of sovereignty."
- Died: Spencer S. Wood, 78, American admiral

== July 31, 1940 (Wednesday) ==
- A conference was held at the Berghof between Hitler, Keitel, Jodl, Raeder, Brauchitsch, Halder and Puttkamer. Raeder reported that the navy would not be ready for Operation Sea Lion until mid-September, if then, so discussion turned to attacking the Soviet Union instead. Hitler believed that defeating Russia would make Germany unbeatable and force Britain to come to terms, so an invasion of the Soviet Union was set for spring 1941.
- The British began the action codenamed Operation Hurry, with the goal of ferrying fourteen aircraft to Malta for the garrison's defence.
- Vichy France imposed the death penalty for all French servicemen who joined a foreign army.
- Born: Roy Walker, television personality and comedian, in Belfast, Northern Ireland
