= Democratic Socialist Party =

Democratic Socialist Party may refer to:

== Current parties ==
- Arab Democratic Socialist Ba'ath Party (Syria)
- Democratic Socialists (Italy)
- Social Democratic Party (Romania)
- Democratic Socialists of America (USA)
- Democratic Socialist Party (Guinea-Bissau)
- Democratic Socialist Party (Lebanon)
- Democratic Socialist Party (Nepal)
- Democratic Socialist Party (Prabodh Chandra) (India)
- Democratic Socialist Unionist Party (Syria)
- Democratic Socialist Vanguard Party (Morocco)
- Philippine Democratic Socialist Party
- Loktantrik Samajwadi Party (India)

== Former parties ==
- Democratic Socialist Party (Bosnia and Herzegovina)
- China Democratic Socialist Party
- Democratic Socialists (Germany)
- Democratic Socialist Party (Argentina)
- Democratic Socialist Party (Australia)
- Democratic Socialist Party (France)
- Democratic Socialist Party of Greece
- Democratic Socialist Party (Ireland)
- Democratic Socialist Party (Japan)
- Democratic Socialist Party (Morocco)
- Democratic Socialists '70 (Netherlands)
- Democratic Socialists (Norway)
- Italian Democratic Socialists
- Italian Democratic Socialist Party
- League of African Democratic Socialist Parties
- Parti de la Democratie Socialiste (Quebec, Canada)
- Party of Democratic Socialism (Czech Republic)
- Sammarinese Democratic Socialist Party (San Marino)
- Sammarinese Independent Democratic Socialist Party (San Marino)
- Vietnamese Democratic Socialist Party

== See also ==
- List of socialist parties
- Social Democratic Party
- Socialist Democratic Party (disambiguation)
- Socialists and Democrats (disambiguation)
- Party of Democratic Socialism (disambiguation)
