= TDP =

TDP or TdP may refer to:

== Computing ==
- Thermal design power, a value describing the thermal limits of a computer system
- Transparent Distributed Processing, a network distributed architecture in the QNX operating system

== Politics ==
- Telugu Desam Party, a political party in India
- Territoires de progrès, a political movement in France
- Texas Democratic Party, the affiliate of the Democratic Party (United States) in Texas
- Democratic Party of Turkmenistan, the ruling party of Turkmenistan since its independence
- Socialist Democratic Party (Turkey), a former political party
- Communal Democracy Party, a political party in Northern Cyprus
- Democratic Party of Turks, a political party in North Macedonia

== Science and medicine ==
- TDaP, tetanus, diphtheria and pertussis vaccine
- Thermal depolymerization, a process for converting biomass into oil
- Thymidine diphosphate, a nucleotide
- Thiamine pyrophosphate (thiamine diphosphate), an enzyme cofactor
- One or more isoforms of TARDBP, a TAR DNA-binding protein
- Torsades de pointes, a form of cardiac arrhythmia

== Other uses ==
- Tour de Pologne (TdP), an annual men's multiple-stage bicycle race held in Poland
- Thames Discovery Programme, a community archaeology project, focusing on the tidal Thames
- Trans-Dimensional Police, a fictional agency from the comic book Grimjack
- Teledeporte, a Spanish TV sports channel
