= 1895 Salford Borough Council election =

Local election in Salford

- 1 November 1895

16 of 64 seats on Salford County Borough Council 33 seats needed for a majority
	First party	Second party	Third party
Party	Conservative	Liberal	Independent
Last election	9 seats, 41.6%	7 seats, 42.5%	0 seats, 2.8%
Seats before	35	26	1
Seats won	4	6	5
Seats after	33	24	5
Seat change	▼2	▼2	▲4
Popular vote	1,246	2,328	2,379
Percentage	17.3%	32.3%	33.0%
Swing	▼24.3%	▼10.2%	▲30.2%
	Fourth party	Fifth party
Party	Liberal Unionist	Independent Labour
Last election	did not contest	0 seats, 4.3%
Seats before	1	1
Seats won	1	0
Seats after	1	1
Seat change	Steady	Steady
Popular vote	0	0
Percentage	0.0%	0.0%
Swing	N/A	▼4.3%
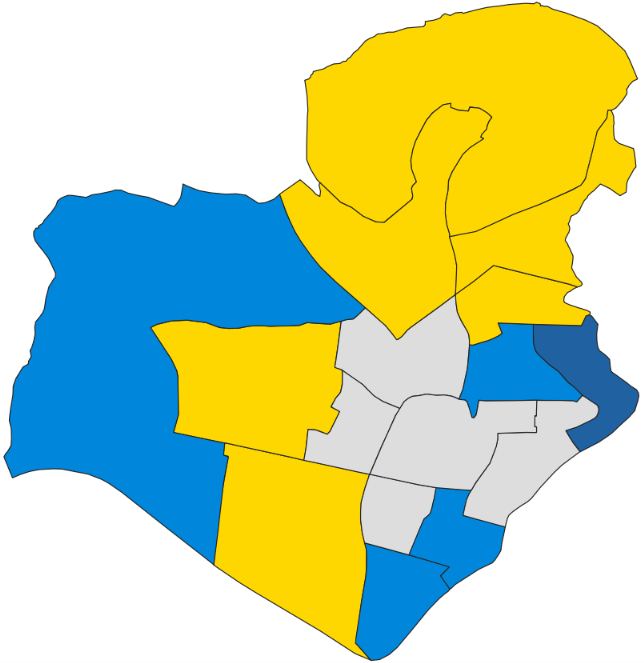
- Map of results of 1895 election
Leader of the Council before election
Conservative
Leader of the Council after election
Conservative

Elections to Salford Borough Council were held on Friday, 1 November 1895. One third of the councillors seats were up for election, with each successful candidate to serve a three-year term of office. The Conservative Party retained overall control of the council.

== Election result ==
Party	Votes		Seats			Full Council	
Conservative Party	1,246 (17.3%)	▼24.3	4 (25.0%)	4 / 16	▼2	33 (51.6%)	33 / 64
Liberal Party	2,328 (32.3%)	▼10.2	6 (37.5%)	6 / 16	▼2	24 (37.5%)	24 / 64
Independent	2,379 (33.0%)	▲30.2	5 (31.3%)	5 / 16	▲4	5 (7.8%)	5 / 64
Liberal Unionist	0 (0.0%)	N/A	1 (6.3%)	1 / 16	Steady	1 (1.6%)	1 / 64
Independent Labour	0 (0.0%)	▼4.3	0 (0.0%)	0 / 16	Steady	1 (1.6%)	1 / 64
Ind. Labour Party	923 (12.8%)	▲4.0	0 (0.0%)	0 / 16	Steady	0 (0.0%)	0 / 64
Social Democratic Party	332 (4.6%)	N/A	0 (0.0%)	0 / 16	N/A	0 (0.0%)	0 / 64

=== Full council ===
↓
1	24	5	1	33

=== Aldermen ===
↓
5	11

=== Councillors ===
↓
1	19	5	1	22

== Ward results ==
=== Albert Park ===
Albert Park
Party	Candidate	Votes	%	±%
Liberal	E. D. Mansfield*	uncontested		
Liberal hold		Swing		

=== Charlestown ===
Charlestown
Party	Candidate	Votes	%	±%
Liberal	G. H. Openshaw*	388	55.5	−38.0
Ind. Labour Party	J. Dudley	311	44.5	+38.0
Majority		77	11.0	−76.0
Turnout		699		
Liberal hold		Swing		

=== Crescent ===
Crescent
Party	Candidate	Votes	%	±%
Independent	D. Williams	uncontested		
Independent gain from Liberal		Swing		

=== Grosvenor ===
Grosvenor
Party	Candidate	Votes	%	±%
Liberal	T. Smith*	652	62.2	N/A
Ind. Labour Party	J. Nuttall	312	29.7	−13.7
Independent	J. Gould	85	8.1	N/A
Majority		340	32.5	
Turnout		1,049		
Liberal hold		Swing		

=== Hope ===
Hope
Party	Candidate	Votes	%	±%
Conservative	A. Haworth*	uncontested		
Conservative hold		Swing		

=== Islington ===
Islington
Party	Candidate	Votes	%	±%
Independent	P. Unsworth	uncontested		
Independent gain from Conservative		Swing		

=== Kersal ===
Kersal
Party	Candidate	Votes	%	±%
Liberal	J. G. de Thibatlier Mandley*	uncontested		
Liberal hold		Swing		

=== Ordsall ===
Ordsall
Party	Candidate	Votes	%	±%
Conservative	C. S. Madan*	737	79.2	+26.4
Social Democratic Federation	W. H. Chapman	193	20.8	N/A
Majority		544	58.4	+52.8
Turnout		930		
Conservative hold		Swing		

=== Regent ===
Regent
Party	Candidate	Votes	%	±%
Independent	J. Higson*	880	86.4	N/A
Social Democratic Federation	W. H. Cuddiford	139	13.6	N/A
Majority		741	72.8	
Turnout		1,019		
Independent hold		Swing		

=== St. Matthias' ===
St. Matthias'
Party	Candidate	Votes	%	±%
Conservative	H. Linsley*	uncontested		
Conservative hold		Swing		

=== St. Paul's ===
St. Paul's
Party	Candidate	Votes	%	±%
Independent	J. B. Foden	592	53.8	N/A
Conservative	P. C. Gorton	509	46.2	N/A
Majority		83	7.6	
Turnout		1,101		
Independent gain from Conservative		Swing		

=== St. Thomas' ===
St. Thomas'
Party	Candidate	Votes	%	±%
Independent	R. H. Quine	415	38.4	−9.3
Independent	J. Ward	407	37.6	N/A
Liberal	T. L. Luckman*	260	24.0	N/A
Majority		8	0.7	
Turnout		1,082		
Independent gain from Liberal		Swing		

=== Seedley ===
Seedley
Party	Candidate	Votes	%	±%
Liberal	H. Roper*	494	74.8	−4.9
Ind. Labour Party	J. Price	166	25.2	+4.9
Majority		328	49.6	−9.8
Turnout		660		
Liberal hold		Swing		

=== Trafford ===
Trafford
Party	Candidate	Votes	%	±%
Conservative	J. Thompson*	uncontested		
Conservative hold		Swing		

=== Trinity ===
Trinity
Party	Candidate	Votes	%	±%
Liberal Unionist	J. Baker*	uncontested		
Liberal Unionist hold		Swing		

=== Weaste ===
Weaste
Party	Candidate	Votes	%	±%
Liberal	E. Denson	534	79.9	+7.0
Ind. Labour Party	C. W. Fraser	134	20.1	−7.0
Majority		400	59.8	+14.0
Turnout		668		
Liberal hold		Swing		

== Aldermanic elections ==
=== Aldermanic elections, 9 November 1895 ===
At the meeting of the council on 9 November 1895, the terms of office of eight aldermen expired.

The following eight were elected as aldermen by the council on 9 November 1895 for a term of six years.

Party	Alderman	Ward	Term expires
Liberal	Isaac Bowes*		1901
Conservative	Daniel Hall*		1901
Liberal	John George de Thibatlier Mandley	St. Thomas'	1901
Conservative	John James Meakin	Kersal	1901
Conservative	Richard Mottram*		1901
Conservative	Thomas Robinson*		1901
Conservative	Samuel Rudman	Ordsall	1901
Conservative	Joseph Snape	Trafford	1901

== By-elections between 1895 and 1896 ==
=== By-elections, 14 November 1895 ===
Two by-elections were held on 14 November 1895 to fill vacancies that were created by the appointment of aldermen on 9 November 1895.

==== Kersal ====
Caused by the election as an alderman of Councillor John George de Thibatlier Mandley (Liberal, Kersal, elected 1 November 1877) on 9 November 1895, following the resignation on 9 November 1881 of Alderman John Begg McKerrow (Liberal, elected as an alderman by the council on 9 November 1871); and by the election as an alderman of Councillor John James Meakin (Conservative, Kersal, elected 1 November 1881) on 9 November 1895, following the resignation on 9 November 1881 of Alderman Albert Dickens (Conservative, elected as an alderman by the council on 9 November 1883).

Kersal (2 vacancies)
Party	Candidate	Votes	%	±%
Conservative	S. J. McMechan	uncontested		
Liberal	J. Barnes	uncontested		
Conservative hold		Swing		
Liberal hold		Swing		

==== Trinity ====
Caused by the election as an alderman of Councillor Joseph Snape (Conservative, Trinity, elected 1 November 1881) on 9 November 1895, following the resignation on 9 November 1881 of Alderman William Brown (Conservative, elected as an alderman by the council on 9 November 1876).

Trinity
Party	Candidate	Votes	%	±%
Conservative	J. Oliver	uncontested		
Conservative hold		Swing		

=== Ordsall, 22 November 1895 ===
Caused by the election as an alderman of Councillor Samuel Rudman (Conservative, Ordsall, elected 1 November 1882 on 9 November 1895, following the resignation on 9 November 1881 of Alderman William Sharp (Conservative, elected as an alderman by the council on 9 November 1877).

Ordsall
Party	Candidate	Votes	%	±%
Conservative	R. A. Chapman	621	50.2	−29.0
Independent	J. Williams	464	37.5	N/A
Social Democratic Federation	A. Acton	141	11.4	−9.4
Liberal	R. J. J. Murphy	10	0.9	N/A
Majority		157	12.7	−45.7
Turnout		1,236		
Conservative hold		Swing		
