= Liberal Socialist Party (disambiguation) =

Liberal Socialist Party may refer to:

- Liberal Socialist Party (Angola)
- Liberal Socialist Party (Singapore)
- Liberal Socialist Party (Switzerland)
- Liberal Socialists Party, a defunct Egyptian political party
- Liberal Socialist Action Party, a minor Italian political party
