= Socialists and Democrats (disambiguation) =

S&D often refers to the Progressive Alliance of Socialists and Democrats. It may also refer to:

- Party of Socialists and Democrats; Sammarinese political party
- Socialists, Democrats and Greens Group; political grouping in the Parliamentary Assembly of the Council of Europe
- Socialists and Democrats (Italy); faction within the Democratic Party (Italy)
- Socialists, Greens and Democrats; group in the Benelux Parliament
- Socialists and Democrats; Hungarian political party, split from Hungarian Socialist Party

== See also ==
- Democratic Socialist Party (disambiguation)
- List of democratic socialist parties and organizations
- S&D (disambiguation)
- Social Democrats (disambiguation)
- Social Democratic Party
- Socialist Democratic Party (disambiguation)
