= SPD (disambiguation) =

SPD is the Social Democratic Party of Germany, a political party.

SPD may also refer to:

== Science and technology ==
- Suspended Particle Device, glass or plastic with electrically variable light transmission
- Shimano Pedaling Dynamics, clipless bicycle pedals
- Spectral power distribution, of light
- Surge protection device, for electrical voltage spikes
- Severe plastic deformation
- Symmetric positive definite, in linear algebra
- Short-path distillation
- Spin Physics Detector, a component of the planned NICA particle accelerator near Moscow, Russia

=== Computing ===
- Security Policy Database, rules in an IPsec implementation, for example in a High Assurance Internet Protocol Encryptor
- Serial presence detect, a method to access memory module information
- SharePoint Designer, an interface for designing in Microsoft SharePoint
- Short Payment Descriptor, a compact textual data format (a MIME/file type) for an easy exchange of a payment information, using smart phones or NFC devices; a standard for QR code payments
- SPD (Systems Product Division) bus, an I/O bus used in the IBM 9370 and IBM AS/400 systems

=== Medicine ===
- Schizoid personality disorder
- Schizotypal personality disorder
- Sadistic personality disorder
- Split personality disorder, an alternative name for dissociative identity disorder
- Semantic pragmatic disorder, a pervasive developmental disorder
- Symphysis pubis dysfunction, pelvic joint pain during pregnancy or childbirth
- Sensory processing disorder
- Sterile processing department
- Salmon poisoning disease

== Organisations ==
- Freedom and Direct Democracy (Svoboda a přímá demokracie), a Czech political party
- Serbian Movement Dveri (Srpski pokret Dveri), a political party in Serbia
- Nintendo Software Planning & Development
- Salym Petroleum Development, a petroleum company in Russia
- Scuola Politecnica di Design, a Milan-based postgraduate design school
- Small Press Distribution, distributor for literary publishers, Berkeley, California, US
- Shanghai Pudong Development Bank, or SPD Bank, China

=== Police ===
- Sacramento Police Department
- Sanford Police Department
- Sarasota Police Department
- Seattle Police Department
- Southern Police District
- Springfield Police Department (disambiguation)
- Suffolk Police Department

== Fiction ==
- Space Patrol Delta, an organization in Power Rangers S.P.D.
- Special Police Dekaranger, an organization in Tokusou Sentai Dekaranger

== Other uses ==
- "S.P.D." (song)
- Saidpur Airport (IATA code), Bangladesh
- Supplementary planning document, in UK local development framework

== See also ==
- Schizotypal personality disorder (STPD)
- SDP (disambiguation)
