= Socialist Action Party =

Socialist Action Party may refer to:

- Arab Socialist Action Party, Saudi Arabia
- Arab Socialist Action Party – Arabian Peninsula, Saudi Arabia
- Liberal Socialist Action Party, Italy
- National Socialist Action Party, Britain
- Sardinian Socialist Action Party, Sardinia
- Senegalese Party of Socialist Action, Senegal
- Socialist Action Party (Spain)

== See also ==
- Socialist Action (disambiguation)
- List of socialist parties
