= Social democracy (disambiguation) =

Social democracy is a political ideology within socialism.

Social democracy or Social Democracy may also refer to:

== Ideologies ==
- Democratic socialism, a form of socialism which emphasizes democracy
- Nordic model, a policy regime in Northern Europe
- Social market economy, a social welfare model in Western Europe

== Political parties ==
- Social Democracy (Czech Republic) (Sociální demokracie), a centre-left social-democratic political party in the Czech Republic
- Social Democracy (Italy, 1922) (Democrazia Sociale), a centre-left political party in Italy
- Social Democracy (Italy, 2022) (Socialdemocrazia), a centre-left political party in Italy
- Social Democracy (Mexico) (Democracia Social), a social-democratic political party in Mexico
- Social Democracy (Serbia) (Социјалдемократија), a social-democratic political party in Serbia

== See also ==
- Social Democrats (disambiguation)
- Social Democratic Party
- List of social democratic parties
