= Socialist Republican Party =

Socialist Republican Party may refer to:

- Independent Socialist Republican Party, Senegal
- Irish Socialist Republican Party
- Radical Socialist Republican Party, Spain
- Socialist Republican Party (Bolivia)
- Socialist Republican Party (Ireland)
- Socialist Republican Party (Kerala), India
- Socialist Republican Party (Sudan)
- Socialist Republican Party (Turkey)
- Socialist Republican Party of Ceará, Brazil

== See also ==
- List of socialist parties
