= Socialist Action =

Socialist Action may refer to a number of current and former political parties and organisations, mainly in the Trotskyist tradition:

== Current ==
- Socialist Action (Canada)
- Socialist Action (Hong Kong)
- Socialist Action (UK)
- Socialist Action (United States)

== Former ==
- Socialist Action (Australia)
- Socialist Action League, the former name of the Trotskyist Communist League (New Zealand)
- Socialist Action Party (PASOC), a left breakaway from the Spanish Socialist Workers' Party that participated in the formation of the United Left (Spain)
- League for Socialist Action (Canada), a Trotskyist group in Canada that merged to form the Revolutionary Workers League in 1977
- League for Socialist Action (UK), a Trotskyist group in the United Kingdom that remerged with the International Marxist Group in 1982
- Socialist Action (Poland), a paramilitary wing of the Polish Socialist Party (PPS) during the Second Polish Republic.

== See also ==
- Socialist Action Party
