= D&S =

D&S may refer to:

- Domination and submission (BDSM), or
- the Chilean company Distribución y Servicio (D&S)

== See also ==
- S&D (disambiguation)
