= August 1940 =

Month of 1940

<<	August 1940					>>
Su	Mo	Tu	We	Th	Fr	Sa
				1	2	3
4	5	6	7	8	9	10
11	12	13	14	15	16	17
18	19	20	21	22	23	24
25	26	27	28	29	30	31

The following events occurred in August 1940:

== August 1, 1940 (Thursday) ==
- Vyacheslav Molotov made a speech to the Supreme Soviet of the Soviet Union proudly recounting the recent annexation of the Baltic states and clearly signalling the USSR's wish to recover all the territories that had been "stolen" from it during the country's military weakness at the end of World War I.
- Japanese Foreign Minister Matsuoka Yosuke formally announced the concept of a Greater East Asia Co-Prosperity Sphere.
- Hitler issued Directive No. 17, declaring his intention to intensify air and sea warfare against the English in order to "establish the necessary conditions for the final conquest of England."
- Charles de Gaulle made a special appeal to French Canadians for their help.
- Born: Ram Loevy, television director and screenwriter, in Tel Aviv, Mandatory Palestine (d. 2025)
- Died: Temulji Bhicaji Nariman, 91, Indian physician and obstetrician

== August 2, 1940 (Friday) ==
- A French military court tried Charles de Gaulle in absentia for treason and sentenced him to death.
- The Moldavian Soviet Socialist Republic was established.
- Czech pilot Josef František joined the Royal Air Force.

== August 3, 1940 (Saturday) ==
- The Italian Army invaded British Somaliland.
- Born: Martin Sheen, actor, in Dayton, Ohio
- Died: Willard Hershberger, 30, American baseball player (suicide); Krishna Raja Wadiyar IV, 56

== August 4, 1940 (Sunday) ==
- Operation Hurry ended in British success.
- American General John J. Pershing gave a nationwide radio broadcast urging that aid be sent to Britain. "It is not hysterical to insist that democracy and liberty are threatened," Pershing said. "Democracy and liberty have been overthrown on the continent of Europe. Only the British are left to defend democracy and liberty in Europe. By sending help to the British we can still hope with confidence to keep the war on the other side of the Atlantic Ocean, where the enemies of liberty, if possible, should be defeated." That same day, Charles Lindbergh appeared at a pro-isolationism rally in Chicago and said that "if our own military forces are strong, no foreign nation can invade us and if we do not interfere with their affairs none will desire to."

== August 5, 1940 (Monday) ==
- The Italians captured Zeila in British Somaliland.
- Died: Frederick Cook, 75, American explorer

== August 6, 1940 (Tuesday) ==
- The Italians captured Odweina in British Somaliland.
- The American ambassador to Belgium John Cudahy said that the food situation in Belgium and northern France was desperate and suggested that the Nazis seemed to be expecting outside aid to solve the food shortage for them. This comment would be controversial for touching on the issue of the British blockade.

== August 7, 1940 (Wednesday) ==
- Winston Churchill and Charles de Gaulle signed an agreement on the military organization of the Free French. Churchill agreed to allow the French units to have as much autonomy as possible.
- The Louisiana hurricane made landfall at Sabine Pass, Texas. The hurricane would cause record flooding across the Southern United States before dissipating on August 10.
- Exeter Blitz: Exeter, Devon was bombed for the first time, by a lone raider that did little damage.
- German submarine U-140 was commissioned.
- Born: Jean-Luc Dehaene, Prime Minister of Belgium, in Montpellier, France (d. 2014)

== August 8, 1940 (Thursday) ==
- The Luftwaffe began targeting British ports and harbours.
- Romania promulgated racial laws modeled after those of Nazi Germany.
- The Japanese battleship Yamato is launched, she would become the largest and heaviest battleship to ever set sail.
- The adventure film Boom Town starring Clark Gable, Spencer Tracy, Claudette Colbert and Hedy Lamarr premiered at Grauman's Chinese Theatre in Hollywood.
- Born: Dilip Sardesai, Test cricketer, in Margao, Goa, British India (d. 2007)
- Died: Johnny Dodds, 48, American jazz clarinetist and alto saxophonist

== August 9, 1940 (Friday) ==
- German military commander Alfred Jodl issued a directive titled Aufbau Ost ("Reconstruction East"), ordering that transport and supply facilities be improved in the east so the logistics would be in place for an attack on the Soviet Union in 1941.
- The first air raid of the Birmingham Blitz took place when a single aircraft bombed Erdington.
- Sumner Welles read a formal statement at a press conference calling John Cudahy's recent remarks "in violation of standing instructions of the Department of State" and said that they were "not to be construed as representing the views of this government." The statement went on to say that the incident "illustrates once again the importance which must be attributed by American representatives abroad to the Department's instructions to refrain at this critical time from making public statements other than those made in accordance with instructions of the Department of State."
- The adventure film Captain Caution starring Victor Mature, Bruce Cabot and Alan Ladd was released.

== August 10, 1940 (Saturday) ==
- The Japanese blockade of China was extended to southern China.
- The British armed merchant cruiser Transylvania was sunk west of Islay by German submarine U-56.
- John Cudahy was recalled from his post for "consultation". The Daily Mail quoted him as saying, "I do not retract one word from what I said."
- Born: Bobby Hatfield, singer and one-half of the Righteous Brothers, in Beaver Dam, Wisconsin (d. 2003)

== August 11, 1940 (Sunday) ==
- The Kanalkampf ended in limited German victory.
- The South Carolina hurricane struck the coast of Georgia and South Carolina, resulting in 50 fatalities between this day and the next.
- Died: Guy Branch, EGM, 26, Royal Air Force fighter pilot (killed in action)

== August 12, 1940 (Monday) ==
- The second phase of the Battle of Britain began as the Luftwaffe expanded its targets to include British airfields. Bf 110s and Stuka dive bombers attacked radar installations along the coastlines of Kent, Sussex and the Isle of Wight, damaging five radar stations and putting one out of action for eleven days.
- It became a crime in the United Kingdom to waste food.

== August 13, 1940 (Tuesday) ==
- The German military operation known as Adlertag ("Eagle Day") was put into action with the goal of destroying the Royal Air Force, but the attempt failed.
- The Canberra air disaster killed ten people, including three ministers of the Australian Cabinet.
- Vichy France passed a law aimed at Freemasonry by banning secret societies.
- Born: Dirk Sager, journalist, in Hamburg, Germany (d. 2014)
- Died: Peter Eckersley, 36, English cricketer, politician and Fleet Air Arm aviator (plane crash); James Fairbairn, 43, Australian pastoralist, aviator and politician; Henry Gullett, 62, Australian cabinet minister; Geoffrey Street, 46, Australian cabinet minister; Brudenell White, 63, Australian Army officer

== August 14, 1940 (Wednesday) ==
- U.S. President Franklin D. Roosevelt approved Rainbow No. 4, an emergency plan to defend the entire Western Hemisphere from attack. The plan required a massive number of soldiers and would have mobilized the National Guard and Reserves as well as introduced conscription.
- Nazi administrator Gustav Simon abrogated the Constitution of Luxembourg, banned all opposition parties and made German the only official language there.
- Born: Galen Hall, American football player and coach, in Altoona, Pennsylvania; Max Schautzer, Austrian-born German radio and television presenter, in Klagenfurt (d. 2025)

== August 15, 1940 (Thursday) ==
- In the biggest air engagement of the Battle of Britain up to this point, the Luftwaffe attempted to overwhelm the RAF with a series of major air attacks. The Germans lost 76 aircraft to the British 34, and to the Germans the day became known as Black Thursday.
- The U.S. Army contracted with Chrysler to build the Detroit Arsenal Tank Plant in Warren, Michigan.
- Died: James P. Goodrich, 76, American politician and 29th Governor of Indiana

== August 16, 1940 (Friday) ==
- The RAF attacked the Fiat manufacturing plant in Turin.
- 48 volunteers of the U.S. 29th Infantry Regiment made the first U.S. Army parachute jump from an aircraft in order to explore its applications in battle.
- The Spanish Surrealist artist Salvador Dalí and wife Gala arrived in New York to escape the war in Europe. They would not return to Europe for eight years.
- The Alfred Hitchcock-directed spy thriller film Foreign Correspondent was released.
- Gardaí detectives Richard Hyland and Patrick McKeown are shot dead by the Anti-Treaty IRA during a Garda Special Branch raid.
- Born: Bruce Beresford, film director, in Paddington, New South Wales, Australia

== August 17, 1940 (Saturday) ==
- Adolf Hitler ordered a total blockade of Britain as a means of weakening the island prior to Operation Sea Lion.
- Canada and the United States signed the Ogdensburg Agreement, establishing the Permanent Joint Board on Defense.
- Wendell Willkie made a speech in his hometown of Elwood, Indiana formally accepting the Republican nomination for president. Willkie promised to return "to those same American principles that overcame German autocracy once before, both in business and in war, to out-distance Hitler in any contest he chooses in 1940 or after." Willkie said that the reason for France's defeat was because that country had become "absorbed in unfruitful political adventures and flimsy economy theories," drawing a parallel to the Roosevelt Administration.

== August 18, 1940 (Sunday) ==
- In the Battle of Britain the air battle known as The Hardest Day was fought, with an inconclusive result. The Germans lost 69 aircraft and the British 29.
- Died: Walter Chrysler, 65, American automotive industry executive and founder of Chrysler Corporation

== August 19, 1940 (Monday) ==
- The weather in Britain from this day through August 23 was wet with plenty of low cloud, causing a drop in the frequency of air raids. British ground crews took advantage of the lull in the fighting to repair damaged planes and airfields while Hermann Göring fumed at the loss of time.
- Italian troops captured Berbera.
- German submarine U-104 was commissioned.
- Gallup published the results of a poll asking Americans whether they approved of a proposal to sell 50 old destroyer ships to England. 62% approved of the idea, 38% disapproved.
- Born: Jill St. John, actress, in Los Angeles, California

== August 20, 1940 (Tuesday) ==
- Winston Churchill made the speech that included the line, "Never was so much owed by so many to so few."
- The Hundred Regiments Offensive began in the Second Sino-Japanese War.
- Leon Trotsky, living in exile in Mexico City, was stabbed with an ice axe by a Soviet agent. He died from his wounds the following day.
- German submarine U-141 was commissioned.
- Born: Musa Geshaev, poet, literary critic, songwriter and historian, in Grozny, Chechen-Ingush ASSR, Soviet Union (d. 2014); Rubén Hinojosa, politician, in Edcouch, Texas

== August 21, 1940 (Wednesday) ==
- Johann Schalk received the Ehrenpokal der Luftwaffe.
- The "tree of liberty", planted in Saverne after Alsace was restored to France at the end of World War I, was chopped down by members of the Hitler Youth.
- Died: Ernest Thayer, 77, American writer and poet; Leon Trotsky, 60, Russian Marxist revolutionary and politician (assassinated)

== August 22, 1940 (Thursday) ==
- Harrow in northwest London received a German bomb at 3:30 a.m., the first to fall within the borders of the London Civil Defence Area.
- Died: Oliver Lodge, 89, British physicist; Gerald Strickland, 1st Baron Strickland, 79, Maltese and British politician and peer; Mary Vaux Walcott, 80, American artist and naturalist

== August 23, 1940 (Friday) ==
- The British destroyer Hostile struck a mine off Cape Bon, Tunisia and had to be scuttled.
- King George VI commanded that the names of all Germans and Italians be stricken from the lists of British titles and decorations. The order affected Benito Mussolini, who had been made a member of the Order of the Bath in 1923, as well as King Victor Emmanuel III who had been a member of the Order of the Garter. No prominent Nazis were affected as few Germans held any British titles.
- The musical drama film Young People, starring Shirley Temple premiered at the Roxy Theatre in New York City. This was Temple's final film for her 20th Century Fox contract and it was thought that it might be her last film ever.
- Born: Tom Baker, actor, in West Virginia (d. 1982)

== August 24, 1940 (Saturday) ==
- Portsmouth suffered the most casualties sustained in a single raid up to this point in the Battle of Britain. Over 100 were killed and 300 injured.
- The Luftwaffe dropped bombs on the heart of London including Oxford Street in the West End and according to the BBC History website, "probably not intentionally", though battleofbritain1940 state that "London was placed under a ‘Red’ alert for two hours [...] A second attack targeted central London". Winston Churchill was outraged and ordered the RAF to bomb Berlin war-related targets in retaliation (factories etc.).
- The German battleship Bismarck was commissioned into service.
- A team of pathologists at Oxford University including Howard Florey, Ernst Chain and Norman Heatley published laboratory results in The Lancet describing methods for the production of penicillin and the effects of its chemotherapeutic action on lab mice.
- Died: Paul Gottlieb Nipkow, 80, German technician and inventor

== August 25, 1940 (Sunday) ==
- The RAF bombed Berlin for the first time in the war. Damage was slight and nobody was killed, but it came as a loss of face for Hermann Göring, who had boasted that Berlin would never be bombed. Hitler authorized the bombing of London in retaliation.
- Born: José van Dam, bass-baritone, in Brussels, Belgium
- Died: Prince Jean, Duke of Guise, 65, Orleanist pretender to the French throne

== August 26, 1940 (Monday) ==
- The French colony of Chad joined the Free French side and declared war on Germany and Italy.
- The Luftwaffe bombed the town of Wexford on the south-east coast of neutral Ireland, killing three women. Ireland protested to Germany over the incident.
- No. 1 Fighter Squadron RCAF became the first Royal Canadian Air Force unit to engage enemy planes in battle when it encountered German bombers over southern England.

== August 27, 1940 (Tuesday) ==
- Philippe Leclerc led a bloodless coup in Cameroon that toppled the Vichy presence there and switched the colony's allegiance to the Free French.
- President Roosevelt signed a joint resolution authorizing him to call National Guard and Army Reserve components into federal service for one year.
- Born: Fernest Arceneaux, zydeco accordionist and singer, in Lafayette, Louisiana (d. 2008); Sonny Sharrock, jazz guitarist, in Ossining, New York (d. 1994)

== August 28, 1940 (Wednesday) ==
- Liverpool Blitz: The first major air raid on Liverpool took place.
- French Congo and Ubangi-Shari joined the Free French. The small colony of Gabon was the last French possession in the region to remain pro-Vichy.
- German submarine U-94 was commissioned.

== August 29, 1940 (Thursday) ==
- Germany formally apologized to Ireland for the Wexford bombing.
- Northwest of Ireland, German submarine U-100 sank four cargo ships from Allied Convoy OA-204 and damaged a fifth.
- Born: Bennie Maupin, jazz multireedist, in Detroit, Michigan; Johnny Paris, rock musician and leader of Johnny and the Hurricanes, in Walbridge, Ohio (d. 2006); Wim Ruska, Olympic gold medalist in judo, in Amsterdam, Netherlands (d. 2015)

== August 30, 1940 (Friday) ==
- The Second Vienna Award was rendered.
- Vichy France announced that it would allow 6,000 Japanese troops to be stationed in Indochina and use ports, airfields and railroads for military purposes. However, the French government attempted to delay the implementation of this plan for as long as possible.
- German submarine U-93 was commissioned.
- Died: J. J. Thomson, 83, English physicist and Nobel laureate

== August 31, 1940 (Saturday) ==
- President Roosevelt called up 60,000 National Guardsmen into federal service.
- Lovettsville air disaster: A new Pennsylvania Central Airlines Douglas DC-3 passenger plane crashed near Lovettsville, Virginia during a storm, killing all 25 aboard.
- Texel Disaster: Two British Royal Navy destroyers were lost by running into a minefield off the coast of the occupied Netherlands with the loss of around 400 men, 300 of them dead.
- The Caproni Ca.331 military aircraft had its first test flight at Ponte San Pietro, Italy.
- Film stars Laurence Olivier and Vivien Leigh were married at the San Ysidro Ranch in California.
- German submarine U-95 was commissioned.
- Born: Wilton Felder, jazz saxophonist and bassist (The Crusaders), in Houston, Texas (d. 2015); Jack Thompson, actor, in Sydney, Australia
- Died: Ernest Lundeen, 62, American politician and U.S. Senator from Minnesota (killed in the Lovettsville plane crash)
