= Socialist People's Party =

Socialist People's Party may refer to:

- National Socialist People's Party of Sweden
- Socialist People's Party (Brazil)
- Socialist People's Party (Denmark)
  - Youth of the Socialist People's Party
- Socialist People's Party (Furness)
- Socialist People's Party (Indonesia)
- Socialist People's Party (Norway)
- Socialist People's Party (Serbia)
- Socialist People's Party of Montenegro

India

- Socialist Janata (Democratic)
- Samajwadi Janata Dal
- Samajwadi Janata Dal (Democratic)
- Samajwadi Janata Party (Rashtriya)

== See also ==
- List of socialist parties
- People's Socialist Party (disambiguation)
- Popular Socialist Party (disambiguation)
