= September 1940 =

Month of 1940

<<	September 1940					>>
Su	Mo	Tu	We	Th	Fr	Sa
1	2	3	4	5	6	7
8	9	10	11	12	13	14
15	16	17	18	19	20	21
22	23	24	25	26	27	28
29	30

The following events occurred in September 1940:

== September 1, 1940 (Sunday) ==
- The Italians captured Buna, Kenya.
- Biggin Hill aerodrome in Kent was heavily damaged by a German bombing raid.
- The New England hurricane reached peak intensity as it passed by Cape Hatteras, North Carolina. The storm did $4 million in damage and resulted in 7 fatalities.
- Died: Lillian Wald, 73, American nurse, humanitarian and author

== September 2, 1940 (Monday) ==
- U.S. Secretary of State Cordell Hull and British Ambassador Lord Lothian exchanged notes concluding an agreement to trade old American destroyers for 99-year leases on British bases.
- Josef František scored his first kill, a Bf 109E.
- Byron Nelson won the PGA Championship.

== September 3, 1940 (Tuesday) ==
- Adolf Hitler fixed the date of Operation Sea Lion for September 21.
- Vichy France ordered the internment of anyone who posed a threat to national security. Communists were targeted in particular.
- Born:
  - Eduardo Galeano, journalist, writer and novelist, in Montevideo, Uruguay (d. 2015)
  - Joseph C. Strasser, admiral, in New Jersey (d. 2019)

== September 4, 1940 (Wednesday) ==
- Hitler told a crowd at a rally in Berlin: "When the British air force drops two or three or four thousand kilograms of bombs, then we will in one night drop 150, 230, 300 or 400 thousand kilograms - we will raze their cities to the ground."
- With Romania in a state of near-revolution due to public anger at the Second Vienna Award, King Carol II summoned Ion Antonescu to the palace and asked him to form a government. Discussions were held with representatives of the political parties but no result was reached.
- The America First Committee was established by Yale Law School student R. Douglas Stuart, Jr. with the objective of keeping the United States out of the war.
- German submarine U-142 was commissioned.
- Died: George William de Carteret, 70 or 71, Jersey journalist and writer; Hans Zinsser, 61, American physician, bacteriologist and writer

== September 5, 1940 (Thursday) ==
- King Carol II reluctantly agreed to give full powers to Ion Antonescu, but the mood of the country remained volatile. With gunfire ringing out near the Royal Palace, Antonescu visited Carol again that evening and demanded that the king abdicate.
- Oil storage tanks at Thameshaven were among the day's targets of German bombers. Fires broke out at Thameshaven that could be seen from London.
- Born: Raquel Welch, actress and singer, in Chicago (d. 2023)
- Died: Charles de Broqueville, 79, 20th Prime Minister of Belgium

== September 6, 1940 (Friday) ==
- The unpopular King Carol II of Romania abdicated in favour of son Michael.
- Ion Antonescu became the leader of Romania. On September 14 he would take for himself the title of Conducător.
- The Germans bombed Grantham, the headquarters of No. 5 Group RAF. Grantham would be bombed eleven more times through the end of the year and for a while had the distinction of being the most frequently bombed town in all of England.

== September 7, 1940 (Saturday) ==
- The Blitz began when the Luftwaffe shifted its focus from bombing British airfields and aircraft factories to conducting terror raids on London and other major cities in response to British bombing of Berlin. This proved to be a mistake, as it would give RAF Fighter Command much-needed time to regroup.
- The Treaty of Craiova was signed between Bulgaria and Romania.
- The President of Paraguay, José Félix Estigarribia, dies in a plane crash.
- Édouard Daladier, Maurice Gamelin and Paul Reynaud were arrested without charge and interned in the Château de Chazeron.
- Born: Abdurrahman Wahid, 4th President of Indonesia, in Jombang, East Java, Dutch East Indies (d. 2009)

== September 8, 1940 (Sunday) ==
- Italian Field Marshal Rodolfo Graziani agreed to begin an offensive against the British in North Africa the following day, after Benito Mussolini threatened to dismiss him if he did not.
- Jayachamarajendra Wadiyar was crowned Maharaja of the Kingdom of Mysore.

== September 9, 1940 (Monday) ==
- The Italian invasion of Egypt began.
- The Italian Air Force bombed Tel Aviv in Mandatory Palestine, killing 137.
- 93 were killed in the Treznea massacre that took place in Treznea, Sălaj during the handover of Northern Transylvania from Romania to Hungary.

== September 10, 1940 (Tuesday) ==
- A German bomb exploded at Buckingham Palace for the first time.
- The Corpo Aereo Italiano was formed to participate in the Battle of Britain.
- German submarine U-105 was commissioned.
- Born: David Mann, graphic artist, in Kansas City, Missouri (d. 2004)
- Died: Yamaya Tanin, 74, Japanese admiral

== September 11, 1940 (Wednesday) ==
- The Nederlandsche SS (Dutch SS) was formed.
- Winston Churchill gave a radio address saying that a German invasion of Britain could not be delayed for much longer if it was to be tried at all, so "we must regard the next week or so as a very important week for us in our history. It ranks with the days when the Spanish Armada was approaching the Channel and Drake was finishing his game of bowls, or when Nelson stood between us and Napoleon's Grand Army at Boulogne. We have read about all this in the history books, but what is happening now is on a far greater scale and of far more consequence to the life and future of the world and its civilization than those brave old days of the past. Every man and woman will therefore prepare himself and herself to do his duty whatever it may be, with special pride and care."
- Born: Brian De Palma, film director and screenwriter, in Newark, New Jersey; Ajit Singh, economist, in Lahore, British India (d. 2015)
- Died: Issy Smith, 49, Australian-born British soldier and recipient of the Victoria Cross (coronary thrombosis)

== September 12, 1940 (Thursday) ==
- Prehistoric cave paintings were discovered in the Lascaux Cave near Montignac, France. The paintings are mostly of animals and are some of the finest examples of art from the Upper Paleolithic age.
- U.S. Ambassador to Tokyo Joseph Grew warned Secretary of State Hull that Japan might treat an American embargo on oil exports as sanctions and retaliate.
- An explosion at the Hercules Powder Company plant in Kenvil, New Jersey killed 51 people.
- Born: Linda Gray, actress, model, director and producer, in Santa Monica, California; Skip Hinnant, actor and comedian, on Chincoteague Island, Virginia; Mickey Lolich, baseball player, in Portland, Oregon

== September 13, 1940 (Friday) ==
- Italian forces captured Fort Capuzzo in Libya and Sallum in Egypt.
- Born: Óscar Arias, President of Costa Rica and Nobel laureate, in Heredia, Costa Rica

== September 14, 1940 (Saturday) ==
- Hitler postponed Operation Sea Lion to September 27.
- The RAF conducted a particularly heavy bombing raid on Antwerp.
- 158 ethnic Romanians were killed in the Ip massacre in Northern Transylvania.
- German submarine U-96 was commissioned.
- Born: Larry Brown, basketball coach, in Brooklyn, New York
- Born: Ventseslav Konstantinov, Bulgarian writer and translator

== September 15, 1940 (Sunday) ==
- The large-scale air battle known as Battle of Britain Day was fought. Believing the RAF was near its breaking point, the Luftwaffe mounted an all-out offensive, sending two huge waves of about 250 bombers each to bomb London and surrounding areas. The RAF managed to scatter many of the German bomber formations and shoot down 61 planes while losing 31 in return, inflicting a clear and decisive defeat on the Germans.
- Canada introduced conscription for men between the ages of 21 and 24.
- Hitler sent a letter to Francisco Franco asking for Germany to be granted naval bases in the Canary Islands and other places. Franco would reject the request a week later by asking for an excessive amount of compensation in return.
- Lieutenant Colonel Bernhard von Lossberg prepared the Lossberg study on the planned German invasion of the Soviet Union.
- General elections were held in Sweden. The Swedish Social Democratic Party remained the country's largest party, receiving more than half the vote.
- Died: Glenn Frank, 52, American journalist and President of the University of Wisconsin-Madison

== September 16, 1940 (Monday) ==
- Italian forces captured Sidi Barrani. The Italian Tenth Army halted and took up defensive positions around the port so supplies could be moved up.
- RAF planes from the carrier Illustrious attacked Benghazi and sank four Italian ships.
- The Selective Training and Service Act of 1940 was enacted in the United States, the first peacetime conscription in American history.

== September 17, 1940 (Tuesday) ==
- Hitler postponed Operation Sea Lion indefinitely.
- Heinrich Himmler ruled that all Polish workers must wear a yellow badge marked with the letter "P" to distinguish themselves from Germans.

== September 18, 1940 (Wednesday) ==
- The British passenger ship City of Benares was torpedoed and sunk in the Atlantic Ocean by German submarine U-48
- Chongqing University of Technology was established in China.
- The Cincinnati Reds clinched their second straight National League pennant with a 4–3 win over the Philadelphia Phillies in 13 innings.
- German submarine U-143 was commissioned.
- Born: Frankie Avalon, actor and singer, in Philadelphia, Pennsylvania (some sources give year of birth as 1939)
- Died: James Baldwin-Webb, 45 or 46, British Army officer and politician (killed in the City of Benares sinking)

== September 19, 1940 (Thursday) ==
- The Royal Air Force bombed German invasion barges in ports along the French coast. After the attack, Hitler ordered the barges dispersed.
- 1924 Democratic presidential candidate John W. Davis delivered a speech to a U.S. Senate sub-committee proposing an amendment to the Constitution that would limit the President to serving one term lasting six years with no possibility of re-election. "We think we do better if we employ our servants in the executive branch for fixed and certain terms," Davis explained. "We want them to realize that what they do they must do within the allotted span of their official lives ... Six years is long enough in which to do all the good one man is likely to accomplish, if he thinks first of his country and not of himself."

== September 20, 1940 (Friday) ==
- The cargo passenger ship Commissaire Ramel was torpedoed and sunk in the Indian Ocean by the German auxiliary cruiser Atlantis.
- The Universal Horror film The Mummy's Hand was released.
- Born: Tarō Asō, 59th Prime Minister of Japan, in Iizuka, Fukuoka, Japan

== September 21, 1940 (Saturday) ==
- In the Western Approaches, the German submarine U-47 spotted the lightly escorted Allied convoy HX 72. Other U-boats were radioed to the area and the wolfpack sank a total of 11 ships.
- The British government officially approved the use of the London Underground as an air-raid shelter, long after civilians had started using it as one anyway.
- Federal elections were held in Australia. The incumbent Coalition of the United Australia Party led by Prime Minister Robert Menzies and the Country Party led by Archie Cameron maintained power.
- The drama film City for Conquest starring James Cagney, Ann Sheridan and Arthur Kennedy was released.

== September 22, 1940 (Sunday) ==
- The Japanese invasion of French Indochina began.
- The RAF bombed Berlin.
- Four Egyptian cabinet ministers from the Saadist Party resigned in protest against the government's failure to declare war on Italy.
- Born: Anna Karina, French actress, director, and writer (d. 2019).

== September 23, 1940 (Monday) ==
- The Battle of Dakar began off the port of Dakar in French West Africa.
- Vichy France and Poland broke off diplomatic relations.
- King George VI gave a radio address from an underground air-raid shelter at Buckingham Palace. The King declared that Britain would be victorious with the aid of "our friends in the Americas." He also announced the creation of the George Cross and George Medal, new civilian awards for heroism.
- The results of a Gallup poll were published asking Americans, "Which of these two things do you think is the most important for the United States to try to do — to keep out of war ourselves or to help England win, even at the risk of getting into the war?" 52% said help England, 48% said keep out.
- Born: Mohammad-Reza Shajarian, classical singer and composer, in Mashhad, Iran (d. 2020)
- Died: Hale Holden, 71, American railroad executive

== September 24, 1940 (Tuesday) ==
- In retaliation for the events at Dakar, Vichy French air forces attacked Gibraltar but did little damage.
- Jimmie Foxx of the Boston Red Sox became the second member of the 500 home run club, hitting the historic round-tripper off George Caster in the sixth inning of a game against the Philadelphia Athletics. Foxx was only 32 years old and many observers expected him to surpass Babe Ruth's record of 714, but he would hit just 34 more in his career.
- German submarine U-106, one of the most successful of the war, was commissioned.

== September 25, 1940 (Wednesday) ==
- The Battle of Dakar ended in Vichy French victory.
- Joachim von Ribbentrop alerted the German embassy in the Soviet Union that Japan was likely to join Italy and Germany in an alliance soon. Should this happen, the ambassador was instructed to reassure Moscow that this alliance was meant to deter the United States from entering the war and was not directed against Soviet interests.
- Reichskommissar for the Occupied Norwegian Territories Josef Terboven banned all political parties in the country except for Vidkun Quisling's Nasjonal Samling.
- Died: Marguerite Clark, 57, American stage and silent film actress

== September 26, 1940 (Thursday) ==
- The Japanese invasion of French Indochina ended with the completion of Japanese objectives.
- 54 Vichy French bombers raided Gibraltar.
- The U.S. government placed an embargo on the exportation of scrap iron and steel to any country outside the Western Hemisphere excluding Britain, effective October 16.
- Died: Walter Benjamin, 48, German Jewish philosopher and social critic (suicide)

== September 27, 1940 (Friday) ==
- Germany, Italy and Japan signed the Tripartite Pact.
- Under German orders, police in Vichy France began a census of the country's Jews.
- The Detroit Tigers clinched the American League pennant with a 2–0 win over the Cleveland Indians.
- The musical film Strike Up the Band starring Mickey Rooney and Judy Garland was released.
- Born: Femi Robinson, actor, in Abeokuta, Nigeria (d. 2015)
- Died: Julián Besteiro, 70, Spanish politician; Julius Wagner-Jauregg, 83, Austrian physician and Nobel laureate

== September 28, 1940 (Saturday) ==
- The first U.S. destroyers reached Britain.
- Radio Belgique, a broadcast transmitted from London to Nazi-occupied Belgium, was established.
- German submarine U-97 was commissioned.
- Died: Chapman James Clare, 87, British-Australian sailor

== September 29, 1940 (Sunday) ==
- British warships bombarded the coastal road of Italian Libya.
- The Brocklesby mid-air collision occurred over Brocklesby, Australia. Two Avro Ansons of No. 2 Service Flying Training School RAAF collided and, unusually, remained locked together. All four crewmen involved survived the accident.

== September 30, 1940 (Monday) ==
- The day before the annual two-week autumn vacation, school children in Berlin were told that they would be granted extra vacation time if their parents wanted them to go to the country or accept invitations from relatives in rural areas.
- German submarine U-73 was commissioned.
- Born: Dewey Martin, rock drummer, in Chesterville, Ontario, Canada (d. 2009)
