= United Socialist Party =

United or Unified or Unitary Socialist Party may refer to:

- Unified Socialist Party of Andalusia
- United Socialist Party (Bolivia)
- Unified Socialist Party (Burkina Faso)
- Unified Socialist Party of Catalonia
- Unified Socialist Party (France)
- Unified Socialist Party (Germany)
- Unified Socialist Party (Italy)
- Unitary Socialist Party (Italy, 1922)
- Unitary Socialist Party (Italy, 1949)
- United Socialist Party of Korea
- Unified Socialist Party of Mexico
- Unified Socialist Party (Morocco)
- Communist Party of Nepal (Unified Socialist)
- Unified Socialist Party (Persia)
- Unitary Socialist Party (Romania)
- Socialist United Party of Russia
- Unitary Socialist Party (San Marino)
- United Socialist Party (Sri Lanka)
- United Socialist Party (UK)
- United Socialist Party of Venezuela
  - United Socialist Party of Venezuela Youth

== See also ==
- List of socialist parties
