= Social-Demokraten (disambiguation) =

Social-Demokraten (The Social Democrat) was a Swedish newspaper published from 1885 to 1944.

Social-Demokraten could also refer to:

- Social-Demokraten (Chicago newspaper), a Norwegian- and Danish-language newspaper published in the United States from 1911 to 1921
- Dagsavisen, a Norwegian newspaper that was named Social-Demokraten from 1886 to 1923

== See also ==
- Social democracy
- Social Democrats (disambiguation)
