= Socialist Unity Party (disambiguation) =

The Socialist Unity Party of Germany was the ruling party of East Germany from 1949 to 1989.

Socialist Unity Party may also refer to:

- Canadian National Socialist Unity Party
- Republican Socialist Unity Party, Bolivia
- Socialist Unity Party (Finland)
- Socialist Unity Party (Turkey)
- Socialist Unity Party of New Zealand
- Socialist Unity Party of West Berlin, Germany

== See also ==
- Socialist Unity (disambiguation)
- List of socialist parties
