= June 1940 =

Month of 1940

| << | June 1940 | | | | | >> |
| Su | Mo | Tu | We | Th | Fr | Sa |
| | | | | | | 1 |
| 2 | 3 | 4 | 5 | 6 | 7 | 8 |
| 9 | 10 | 11 | 12 | 13 | 14 | 15 |
| 16 | 17 | 18 | 19 | 20 | 21 | 22 |
| 23 | 24 | 25 | 26 | 27 | 28 | 29 |
| 30 |

The following events occurred in June 1940:

== June 1, 1940 (Saturday) ==
- The Actions in Nordland ended in German victory.
- German bombers sank the French destroyer Foudroyant off Dunkirk as the evacuation from there continued. A total of 64,429 were evacuated on this day.
- Born: René Auberjonois, actor and singer, in New York City (d. 2019)
- Died: Alfred Loisy, 83, French Roman Catholic priest, professor and theologian

== June 2, 1940 (Sunday) ==
- Adolf Hitler entered French territory for the first time in the war and visited the Canadian National Vimy Memorial, where photographers took his picture as he walked around the site with his entourage. The photos, showing the memorial intact, were then published in German newspapers to refute stories in the Canadian media claiming that the Germans had bombed it.
- War Secretary Anthony Eden gave a radio address on the Dunkirk evacuation reporting that four-fifths of the British Expeditionary Force had been saved. "The British Expeditionary Force still exists, not as a handful of fugitives, but as a body of seasoned veterans," Eden said. "We have had great losses in equipment. But our men have gained immeasurably in experience of warfare and in self-confidence. The vital weapon of any army is its spirit. Ours has been tried and tempered in the furnace. It has not been found wanting. It is this refusal to accept defeat, that is the guarantee of final victory."
- The remaining French forces at Dunkirk were pushed back into the town itself.
- 26,256 were evacuated from Dunkirk as operations switched to only being undertaken at night due to the costly air attacks.
- The masked crimefighting character The Spirit first appeared in the American Sunday comics.
- Born: Constantine II of Greece, King of Greece from 1964 to 1973, in Psychiko, Athens, Greece (d. 2023)

== June 3, 1940 (Monday) ==
- The Germans launched Operation Paula, an attempt to destroy the French Air Force. However, British intelligence had warned the French of the impending attack and the operation failed to achieve its strategic goals.
- The last British troops were evacuated from Dunkirk.
- German aerial bombing of Paris killed 45 people.
- The Allies began evacuating Narvik.
- 20th Century Fox executive Joseph M. Schenck was indicted on charges of income tax fraud.
- The U.S. Supreme Court decided Minersville School District v. Gobitis.

== June 4, 1940 (Tuesday) ==
- The Battle of Dunkirk ended with the overnight evacuation of 26,175 French troops. At 10:20 a.m. the Germans occupied the city and captured the 30–40,000 French troops who were left.
- In the British House of Commons Winston Churchill made the famous speech commonly titled We shall fight on the beaches.
- The Battle of Abbeville ended in German victory.
- German Admiral Wilhelm Marschall launched Operation Juno, sending a large naval force for Norway to disrupt the Allied supply lines to Narvik.
- Forbes Field in Pittsburgh hosted its first night game; the hometown Pirates beat the Boston Braves 14-2.
- Born: Ludwig Schwarz, Roman Catholic bishop, in Most pri Bratislave, Slovak Republic

== June 5, 1940 (Wednesday) ==
- The Germans began the second phase of the invasion of France, codenamed Fall Rot, by attacking across the Somme and Aisne rivers. The Germans initially met stiff resistance, since the French had spent the previous two weeks organizing their defenses south of the Somme.
- The French cabinet underwent a reshuffle. Édouard Daladier was removed and Charles de Gaulle became Under-Secretary for Defence.
- The British government banned all labour strikes.
- German fighter ace Werner Mölders was shot down and taken prisoner by the French. He would only spend two weeks in captivity.
- Wartime emergency legislation in Canada banned 16 Nazi, Communist and Fascist organizations.
- Died: F. Luis Mora, 65, Uruguayan-born American painter

== June 6, 1940 (Thursday) ==
- The French managed to halt the German advance at Oisemont, although both sides took heavy casualties. Further east, the French 6th Army was pushed back by the German 9th Army on the Ailette north of Soissons.
- All ships of the Italian merchant marine received government orders to proceed immediately to Italian ports.
- A memorandum created in the German Foreign Office proposed several measures for solving the "Jewish question", including mass deportations to the French colony of Madagascar.
- Born: Richard Paul, actor, in Los Angeles, California (d. 1998)
- Died: Arthur Zimmermann, 75, German diplomat

== June 7, 1940 (Friday) ==
- Erich Hoepner's panzers destroyed the French 19th Infantry Division south of Peronne, while the French 10th Army's line was broken at Poix-de-Picardie.
- A single airplane from the French Navy bombed Berlin in a night raid. The Farman 223.4 lingered over the city for as long as possible to create the impression of more than one airplane, then dropped its bomb load over some factories in Berlin's north end.
- The character of Daisy Duck first appeared in the Disney cartoon Mr. Duck Steps Out.
- The comedy-horror film The Ghost Breakers starring Bob Hope and Paulette Goddard had its world premiere in Detroit.
- Born:
  - Tom Jones, singer, in Treforest, Wales
  - Ronald Pickup, actor, in Chester, England (d. 2021)
- Died: James Hall, 39, American film actor (cirrhosis); Hugh Rodman, 81, American admiral

== June 8, 1940 (Saturday) ==
- The German 5th and 7th Panzer Divisions crossed the Seine River. The 5th Panzer Division captured Rouen.
- The Germans executed the naval offensive in Norway codenamed Operation Juno.
- Operation Alphabet ended with the completion of the Allied evacuation from Norway.
- HMS Glorious was sunk by German battlecruiser Scharnhorst and Gneisenau
- Born: Nancy Sinatra, singer and actress, in Jersey City, New Jersey

== June 9, 1940 (Sunday) ==
- Army Group A under the command of Gerd von Rundstedt attacked along a 100-mile front in the Aisne sector. That same day the Germans established a number of bridgeheads along the Aisne.
- The 7th Panzer Division under the command of Erwin Rommel pushed the French 10th Army Corps and the British 51st Highland Division back to the sea at Saint-Valery-en-Caux.
- The French government fled Paris.
- The Soviet Union and Japan signed an agreement ending their dispute over the borders of Manchukuo.
- Lawson Little won the U.S. Open golf tournament.

== June 10, 1940 (Monday) ==
- Norway surrendered to Germany. King Haakon VII and his cabinet escaped to London to form a government in exile.
- At 6 p.m., Benito Mussolini appeared on the balcony of the Palazzo Venezia to announce that in six hours, Italy would be in a state of war with France and Britain. After a speech explaining his motives for the decision, he concluded: "People of Italy: take up your weapons and show your tenacity, your courage and your valor." The Italians had no battle plans of any kind prepared.
- Anti-Italian riots broke out in major cities across the United Kingdom after Italy's declaration of war. Bricks, stones and bottles were thrown through the windows of Italian-owned shops, and 100 arrests were made in Edinburgh alone.
- Canada declared war on Italy.
- Italy broke off relations with Poland.
- Belgium broke off relations with Italy.
- The Italian invasion of France began. Fighting would be mostly limited to skirmishing for the first ten days since both sides along the Franco-Italian border were deployed in defensive positions at the beginning of hostilities.
- 7th Panzer Division reached Dalles near Dieppe.
- While making a commencement speech at the Memorial Gymnasium of the University of Virginia, President Roosevelt denounced Mussolini: "On this tenth day of June, 1940, the hand that held the dagger has plunged it into the back of its neighbor." The president also said that military victories for the "gods of force and hate" were a threat to all democracies in the western world and that America could no longer pretend to be a "lone island in a world of force."
- Operation Cycle, the evacuation of Allied troops from Le Havre, began.
- Born: Daniel J. Sullivan, theatre and film director and playwright, in Wray, Colorado
- Died: Marcus Garvey, 52, Jamaican publisher and black nationalist leader; Norman McLeod Rogers, 45, Canadian Defence Minister (plane crash)

== June 11, 1940 (Tuesday) ==
- Rommel's 7th Panzer Division reached Le Havre, then turned back to trap 46,000 British and French soldiers at Saint-Valery-en-Caux.
- The RAF bombed the El Adem airfield in Libya. The Italians responded a few hours later by bombing Malta.
- The Siege of Malta began.
- Italy severed relations with Norway.
- Australia, New Zealand and South Africa declared war on Italy.
- The French government moved to Tours.
- The Anglo-French Supreme War Council met at a chateau in Briare which General Maxime Weygand was using as a military headquarters. Weygand wanted Churchill to send the entire Royal Air Force to France, but Churchill disagreed, saying that if the Germans would divert their air power to the skies over Britain, the French Army would get a chance to regroup. Churchill expressed determination to fight on until all of France's territory was recovered, no matter how much of it fell to the Germans in the interim, and suggested that the French could resort to guerrilla warfare if the time came when traditional military operations were no longer possible. The French were not receptive to this proposal, alarmed at the prospect of Paris being reduced to ruins while the general outcome of the war remained unchanged. Churchill brought up the question of what the French Navy would do if the Army suspended fighting, but Paul Reynaud ended the meeting by stating that the French were as determined to continue fighting as the British were.
- Late in the day, Kleist's forces crossed the Marne at Château-Thierry.
- The RAF conducted an overnight raid on Turin and Genoa. Bombs intended for the Fiat headquarters and manufacturing plant in Turin missed their targets and killed 14 civilians near the city center, an event the Italians publicized as an act of terrorism.
- German submarine U-124 was commissioned.
- Born: Gunnar Harding, poet, in Sundsvall, Sweden
- Died: Alfred S. Alschuler, 63 or 64, American architect

== June 12, 1940 (Wednesday) ==
- After a last stand, the outflanked 51st Highland Division and French 9th Army Corps surrendered to Rommel at Saint-Valery-en-Caux.
- BR.20s of the Regia Aeronautica bombed the southern French cities of Toulon, Hyères and Saint-Raphaël, as well as the Corsican communes of Calvi and Bastia and the Tunisian city of Bizerte. Not much damage was done, however, as French anti-aircraft fire kept the warplanes from attacking effectively.
- The Anglo-Thai Non-Aggression Pact was concluded in Bangkok.
- Egypt broke off relations with Italy.
- Turkey broke off commercial relations with Italy.

== June 13, 1940 (Thursday) ==
- General Weygand declared Paris an open city.
- Panzer Group Kleist captured Saint-Dizier and Troyes.
- Operation Cycle was completed.
- The Anglo-French Supreme War Council met for the final time, at Tours. Churchill encouraged the French to continue the fight from North Africa, but Reynauld sought British consent to seek an armistice with Germany instead, which Churchill refused to grant.
- Born: Bobbie Clarke, rock drummer, in Coventry, England (d. 2014); M. M. Rahmat Ullah, bureaucrat and politician, in Rajshahi, British India (present-day Bangladesh) (d. 2014)
- Died: George Fitzmaurice, 55, French-born film director and producer

== June 14, 1940 (Friday) ==
- The Germans entered Paris unopposed. The city was eerily silent since 2 million Parisians had already fled and all shops and businesses were closed.
- The 3rd Squadron of the French Navy bombarded Genoa. 9 civilians were killed but damage was otherwise light.
- Francoist Spain took advantage of the German invasion of France by occupying the international zone at Tangier.
- The first inmates of Auschwitz and Theresienstadt concentration camp arrived.
- The Soviet ultimatum to Lithuania was delivered. The Occupation of the Baltic states began.
- The Finnish-owned civilian Junkers Ju 52 passenger and transport plane Kaleva was shot down by two Soviet bombers while en route from Tallinn to Helsinki, killing all 9 on board. Finland did not protest the incident to the Soviets due to fear of a hostile response.
- The drama film The Mortal Storm starring Margaret Sullavan and James Stewart was released.
- Born: Ben Davidson, NFL and AFL defensive end, in Los Angeles, California (d. 2012)
- Died: Henry W. Antheil Jr., 27, American diplomat (killed in the shooting down of the Kaleva)

== June 15, 1940 (Saturday) ==
- The French fortress at Verdun, which famously never surrendered in World War I, capitulated to the Germans.
- The Allied evacuation of military personnel and civilians from France codenamed Operation Aerial began.
- German submarine U-137 was commissioned.
- Harry Danning of the New York Giants hit for the cycle during an 11–1 win over the Pittsburgh Pirates, including an inside-the-park home run.
- Died: Hermann Ritter von Speck, 51, German general (killed in action); Ernst Weiss, 57, Austrian writer of Jewish descent (suicide)

== June 16, 1940 (Sunday) ==
- Philippe Pétain became Prime Minister of France after Paul Reynaud resigned. Only one hour after becoming the head of government, Pétain asked his Foreign Minister Paul Baudouin to pass a note to the Spanish ambassador asking Spain to request "the conditions Chancellor Hitler would require to put a halt to military operations and sign an armistice."
- A dozen Breda Ba.88s of the Regia Aeronautica raided Corsica, but three were shot down by ground fire.
- The Italian submarine Provana was forced to the surface and sunk by the French sloop La Curieuse.
- U.S. Congress authorized the sale of munitions to any republic in the Americas.
- Born: Carole Ann Ford, actress, in Britain; Neil Goldschmidt, businessman and 33rd Governor of Oregon, in Eugene, Oregon (d. 2024); Taylor Wang, Chinese-born American astronaut, in Jiangxi

== June 17, 1940 (Monday) ==
- At 3:00 a.m., Pétain's request to open peace negotiations reached Hitler's headquarters near Sedan. Hitler's aides were unsure whether to wake Hitler up, but his valet eventually did so and gave him the cable. Hitler was not surprised and had been expecting such a message for several days.
- At 12:30 p.m. Pétain took to the radio to deliver his first message to the nation: "It is with a heavy heart that I say to you that fighting must cease." However, fighting went on in some sectors.
- Forces under the command of Heinz Guderian reached the Franco-Swiss border at Pontarlier.
- The Germans bombed a railway complex at Rennes that was crowded with both military personnel and refugees trying to escape the fighting. A munitions train exploded during the attack and a total of 800 people were killed.
- The troopship RMS Lancastria was sunk by German air attack off the port of Saint-Nazaire during Operation Aerial with over 4,000 fatalities. It is the greatest loss of life in the sinking of any British ship in history. Churchill ordered that news of the sinking be kept secret from the British public.
- Soviet troops occupy Latvia and Estonia.
- At 9:00 p.m. Benito Mussolini, Count Ciano and other functionaries boarded a train to go to Munich at Hitler's invitation.
- Born: George Akerlof, economist and Nobel laureate, in New Haven, Connecticut; Alan Murray, golfer, in Sydney, Australia (d. 2019)
- Died: Arthur Harden, 74, British biochemist and Nobel laureate

== June 18, 1940 (Tuesday) ==
- Hitler and Mussolini met in Munich to discuss the French armistice request. Mussolini hoped to present Hitler with a list of spoils that Italy wanted to get from the French, but was embarrassed when Hitler displayed no interest in discussing the matter at the time. Hitler also politely but firmly denied Mussolini's request to sit at the same table to sign the armistice with the French, leaving the Italians to seek out a separate one.
- Churchill made his Battle of Britain speech to the British House of Commons: "...the Battle of France is over. The Battle of Britain is about to begin... if the British Empire and its Commonwealth last for a thousand years, men will still say, This was their finest hour." He repeated the speech on BBC radio in the evening.
- The Ministry of Information (United Kingdom) issued more than 14 million copies of an advisory leaflet If the Invader Comes, written by Kenneth Clark with Harold Nicolson.
- The Germans captured Le Mans, Belfort, Metz and Dijon.
- The Battle of Saumur began.
- Erwin Rommel's 7th Panzer Division entered Cherbourg at 4:30 p.m. but found that most of the Allied personnel had already evacuated. Half an hour later Rommel visited the Port Admiral's office and accepted the city's surrender.
- The Battle of Zaoyang–Yichang ended in Japanese victory.
- Appeal of 18 June: The BBC broadcast a speech by Charles de Gaulle. "Must we abandon all hope?," de Gaulle asked the French people. "Is our defeat final and irremediable? To those questions I answer - No! Speaking in full knowledge of the facts, I ask you to believe me when I say that the cause of France is not lost. The very factors that brought about our defeat may one day lead us to victory ... I, General de Gaulle, now in London, call on all French officers and men who are at present on British soil, or may be in the future, with or without their arms; I call on all engineers and skilled workmen from the armaments factories who are at present on British soil, or may be in the future, to get in touch with me. Whatever happens, the flame of French resistance must not and shall not die."

== June 19, 1940 (Wednesday) ==
- The Germans captured Lorient, but not in time to stop all the seaworthy ships in its port from being scuttled.
- The 5th Panzer Division captured Brest at 7 p.m.
- Charles de Gaulle broadcast again over the BBC. "Faced by the bewilderment of my countrymen, by the disintegration of a government in thrall to the enemy, by the fact that the institutions of my country are incapable, at the moment, of functioning, I, General de Gaulle, a French soldier and military leader, realise that I now speak for France," he said. "In the name of France, I make the following solemn declaration: It is the bounden duty of all Frenchmen who still bear arms to continue the struggle. For them to lay down their arms, to evacuate any position of military importance, or agree to hand over any part of French territory, however small, to enemy control, would be a crime against our country. For the moment I refer particularly to French North Africa - to the integrity of French North Africa."
- The British Jockey Club announced that there would be no more horse racing until further notice.
- President Roosevelt fired Harry Hines Woodring as Secretary of War for refusing a direct order to transfer a dozen B-17s to Britain. Woodring was offered the governorship of Puerto Rico as consolation, but he refused.
- Born: Paul Shane, comedian and actor, in Thrybergh, West Riding of Yorkshire, England (d. 2013); Ian Smith, actor, in Melbourne, Australia
- Died: Maurice Jaubert, 40, French composer (died of wounds sustained in combat)

== June 20, 1940 (Thursday) ==
- Determined to mount a token ground offensive before an armistice could be signed, Mussolini ordered an immediate attack against the French in the Alps.
- The Germans captured Lyon.
- Luftwaffe bombs fell on Dibden Parish Church in Hampshire. It was not fully restored until 1959
- The Battle of Saumur ended in German victory.
- The first Australian and New Zealand troops arrived in the United Kingdom.
- President Roosevelt named Henry L. Stimson the new Secretary of War and Frank Knox the new Secretary of the Navy.
- Born: John Mahoney, English-born American actor, in Blackpool (d. 2018)
- Died: Charley Chase, 46, American comedian, actor, screenwriter and film director

== June 21, 1940 (Friday) ==
- The Italian invasion of France began with an offensive in the Alps at 5:30 a.m. amid a freak snowstorm. 32 Italian divisions under the overall command of Crown Prince Umberto attacked 3 French divisions commanded by René Olry, but failed to make much progress.
- At about 3:15 p.m., peace negotiations between France and Germany began at the Glade of the Armistice in the Forest of Compiègne, using the same rail carriage that the Armistice of 11 November 1918 was signed in. Adolf Hitler personally attended the negotiations at first, but left early as a show of disrespect to the French. A point of contention was the size of the zone that the Germans were to occupy, so the war dragged on for another day.
- Richard Nixon and Pat Nixon get married.
- Alexander Cambridge, 1st Earl of Athlone became the 16th Governor General of Canada.
- Canada passed the National Resources Mobilization Act.
- Born: Mariette Hartley, actress, in Weston, Connecticut
- Died: Smedley Butler, 58, U.S. Marine Corps major general; Janusz Kusociński, 33, Polish athlete (executed in the Palmiry massacre); Mieczysław Niedziałkowski, Polish politician and writer (executed in the Palmiry massacre); Maciej Rataj, 56, Polish politician and writer (executed in the Palmiry massacre); Tomasz Stankiewicz, 37, Polish track cyclist (executed in the Palmiry massacre); Édouard Vuillard, 71, French painter and filmmaker; John T. Thompson, 79, Thompson submachine gun inventor and United States Army brigadier general.

== June 22, 1940 (Saturday) ==
- The Armistice of 22 June 1940 was signed at 6:36 p.m. A German occupation zone was established in the north and west of France with the remainder left "free" to be governed by the French.
- The Germans entered La Rochelle, but not before all the seaport's naval facilities were blown up.
- The Italian offensive reached the eastern approaches of Menton but was unable to advance any further.
- De Gaulle made a third broadcast over the BBC. "Honour, common sense, and the interests of the country require that all free Frenchmen, wherever they be, should continue the fight as best they may," he declared. "It is therefore necessary to group the largest possible French force wherever this can be done. Everything which can be collected by way of French military elements and potentialities for armaments production must be organised wherever such elements exist. I, General de Gaulle, am undertaking this national task here in England. I call upon all French servicemen of the land, sea, and air forces; I call upon French engineers and skilled armaments workers who are on British soil, or have the means of getting here, to come and join me."
- Dairy Queen opened its first location in Joliet, Illinois
- Born:
  - Abbas Kiarostami, filmmaker, in Tehran, Iran (d. 2016)
  - Esther Rantzen, journalist and television presenter, in Berkhamsted, England (d. 2026)
- Died: Walter Hasenclever, 49, German Expressionist poet and playwright (suicide); Monty Noble, 67, Australian cricketer

== June 23, 1940 (Sunday) ==
- Adolf Hitler flew to Paris and visited sites including the Eiffel Tower, the Arc de Triomphe and Napoleon's tomb at Les Invalides.
- Peace talks commenced between the French and Italian delegations at the Villa Incisa near Rome. The French were prepared to walk out if the Italian demands were too harsh, but they were surprised at the leniency of the terms.
- Born: Adam Faith, singer and actor, in Acton, London, England (d. 2003); Derry Irvine, Baron Irvine of Lairg, lawyer, judge and Lord Chancellor, in Inverness, Scotland; Wilma Rudolph, track and field sprinter, in Saint Bethlehem, Tennessee (d. 1994); Stuart Sutcliffe, original bassist for The Beatles, in Edinburgh, Scotland (d. 1962)
- Died: Hermann-Paul, 75, French artist

== June 24, 1940 (Monday) ==
- The Franco-Italian Armistice was signed at 7:15 p.m. A very small zone of Italian occupation was established consisting of 832 km^{2} that included the port town of Menton.
- The 1940 Republican National Convention opened in Philadelphia, Pennsylvania.
- The British began Operation Collar, the first British commando raid of the war, on the northern French department of Pas-de-Calais.
- Operation Fish: British Royal Navy cruiser HMS Emerald sailed from Greenock (Scotland) in convoy for Halifax, Nova Scotia (arrived July 1), carrying a large part of the gold reserves of the United Kingdom and securities for safe keeping in Canada.

== June 25, 1940 (Tuesday) ==
- The Franco-Italian Armistice came into effect at 12:35 a.m.
- Hitler addressed the German nation, praising the Wehrmacht for its victory and ordering that all flags be displayed for 10 days and that church bells be rung for a week.
- Operation Aerial ended, although it would go on unofficially until August 14.
- Operation Collar ended in minor British success.
- German troops were issued English phrase books in preparation for an invasion of Britain.
- Born: A. J. Quinnell, thriller novelist, in Nuneaton, Warwickshire, England (d. 2005)

== June 26, 1940 (Wednesday) ==
- The Soviet Union demanded that Romania cede Bessarabia and northern Bukovina.

== June 27, 1940 (Thursday) ==
- German forces completed the occupation of France by reaching the Spanish border.
- Britain announced a general blockade of the European coastline from the Bay of Biscay to the North Cape of Norway.
- German submarine U-138 was commissioned.
- Born: Anil Karanjai, artist, in East Bengal (d. 2001)

== June 28, 1940 (Friday) ==
- At 1:02 a.m. the Republican Party nominated Wendell Willkie of Indiana as its candidate for President of the United States. A dark horse candidate with a background in business, Willkie had never held public office before but won the nomination because he was seen as a moderate whose views were the closest match to those of the electorate.
- Charles L. McNary of Oregon received the nomination for vice president at the Republican convention.
- Willkie made his acceptance speech before the Republican convention, declaring, "I stand before you without a single pledge or promise or understanding of any kind except for the advancement of your cause and the preservation of American democracy."
- The Soviet occupation of Bessarabia and Northern Bukovina began.
- The Germans bombed the harbours of Saint Helier and La Roque on the island of Jersey and Saint Peter Port Harbour on Guernsey, killing a total of 42 people.
- President Roosevelt signed the Smith Act into law.
- Born: Muhammad Yunus, social entrepreneur, banker, economist and Nobel laureate, in Chittagong, British India (present-day Bangladesh)
- Died: Italo Balbo, 44, Italian aviator and Fascist leader (plane shot down by friendly fire)

== June 29, 1940 (Saturday) ==
- British authorities arrested Diana Mitford, wife of fascist leader Oswald Mosley. The police had already arrested her husband under Defence Regulation 18B a month earlier, but they waited to arrest her as well since she had just given birth to their son Max.
- The Smith Act was enacted in the United States, setting criminal penalties for advocating the overthrow of the U.S. government and requiring all non-citizen adult residents to be registered.
- Born: Vyacheslav Artyomov, composer, in the Soviet Union
- Died: Paul Klee, 60, Swiss-German painter

== June 30, 1940 (Sunday) ==
- The Germans occupied the Channel Islands unopposed.
- The British ocean liner Avelona Star was torpedoed and damaged by German submarine U-43. The survivors were rescued and the Avelona Star sank the next day.
- CD Español defeated Madrid CF 3-2 in the Copa del Generalísimo Final.
- The comic strip Brenda Starr, Reporter first appeared.
