= New Socialist Party =

New Socialist Party may refer to:

- New Socialist Party (Japan)
- New Socialist Party (San Marino)

== See also ==
- New Italian Socialist Party
- List of socialist parties
