= People's Socialist Party =

People's Socialist Party may refer to:

- People's Socialist Party (Yugoslavia)
- People's Socialist Party of Montenegro
- People's Socialist Party (Spain)
- People's Socialist Party (Chile)
- People's Socialist Party (Argentina)
- People's Socialist Party (Nepal, 2024), a political party in Nepal led by Ashok Rai
- People's Socialist Party, Nepal (2020), the original political party led by Upendra Yadav

== See also ==
- List of socialist parties
- Socialist People's Party (disambiguation)
- Popular Socialist Party (disambiguation)
