= Partido Social Democrata =

Partido Social Democrata or Partido Social Demócrata may refer to:

- Social Democratic Party (Angola)
- Social Democratic Party (Bolivia)
- Social Democratic Party (El Salvador)
- Social Democratic Party (Nicaragua)
- Social Democratic Party (Portugal)
- Social Democratic Party (Spain)
- Social Democratic Party (Timor-Leste)

== See also ==
- Social Democratic Party
