= Silesian Socialist Party =

Silesian Socialist Party Śląska Partia Socjalistyczna
- Founder: Józef Biniszkiewicz
- Founded: May 1 1928
- Dissolved: 1930
- Ideology: Democratic Socialism
- Political position: Left-wing

The Silesian Socialist Party (Polish: Śląska Partia Socjalistyczna, ŚPS) was a political party in Silesia, Poland. The party was founded on May 1, 1928, by Józef Biniszkiewicz. When the new party was founded, it took over the regional PPS organ Robotnik Śląski ('Silesian Worker').

Biniszkiewicz had been the leader of the Polish Socialist Party (PPS) in Upper Silesia, but had been expelled from the party for not supporting the opposition of PPS against the Józef Piłsudski government, and for opposing cooperation with German socialist parties. The ŚPS was seen as pro-Sanacja.

The party, which failed to get a prominent role in Silesian politics, was dissolved in 1930.
