= PDS =

PDS can refer to:

== Entertainment ==
- Partially Deceased Syndrome, a fictional condition in BBC show In the Flesh
- Panzer Dragoon Saga, a 1998 video game

== Computing ==
- Partitioned data sets, IBM
- Passive data structure, another term for record
- Processor direct slot, in some old Macintosh computers
- Personal data service, services to let individuals manage their own personal data by themselves
- Program Development System, an early implementation of the DIGITAL Command Language for the IAS operating system.
- Protective distribution system, a safeguarded telecommunication system
- Microsoft BASIC Professional Development System (PDS), a superset of QuickBASIC
- Paradox Development Studios, a game developer subsidiary of Paradox Interactive

== Medical ==
- Paroxysmal depolarizing shift, a pre-seizure interictal neuronal EEG spike in epilepsy.
- Pigment dispersion syndrome, an affliction of the eye
- Polydioxanone, a type of absorbable suture
- Pleomorphic dermal sarcoma, a form of histiocytoma

== Political parties ==
- Party of Democratic Socialism (Partei des Demokratischen Sozialismus), a defunct political party of Germany
- Social Democracy Party of Albania
- Party of Democratic Socialism (India)
- Party of the Sicilians
- Progressive Democrats, a defunct political party of Ireland
- Democratic Party of the Left (Partito Democratico della Sinistra), a defunct political party of Italy
- Senegalese Democratic Party (Parti Démocratique Sénégalais), a political party of Senegal
- Sudanese Democratic Party (Parti Démocratique Soudanais), a defunct political party of Sudan
- Democratic Social Party (Partido Democrático Social), a defunct political party of Brazil
- Prosperous Peace Party (Partai Damai Sejahtera), a political party of Indonesia
- Parti de la Democratie Socialiste, a defunct provincial political party of Quebec, Canada

== Schools ==
- Princeton Day School, New Jersey, US
- Peabody Demonstration School, former school in Nashville, Tennessee, US
- Presbyterian Day School, Memphis, Tennessee, US
- Providence Day School, Charlotte, North Carolina, US
- Patumwan Demonstration School, Srinakharinwirot University, Bangkok, Thailand

== Scientific ==
- Photothermal deflection spectroscopy
- Planetary Data System, a NASA data archive system
- Polydioxanone, a synthetic polymer
- 15-Cis-phytoene desaturase, an enzyme
- Poincaré dodecahedral space
- Power delivery system

== Other ==
- Particularly dangerous situation, special emphasis phrase in weather bulletins from the National Weather Service
- Piedras Negras International Airport, IATA code PDS
- Precision Drill Squad, an exhibition drill of the Singaporean military
- Product design specification
- Public distribution system, Indian food distribution system
- The Philip DeFranco Show, on YouTube

== See also ==
- Plural of PD (disambiguation)
