= League of African Democratic Socialist Parties =

The League of African Democratic Socialist Parties, initially known as the Socialist Inter-African, is a union of democratic socialist political parties in the continent of Africa. It was set up to provide an international forum for moderate socialists in Africa, and proclaimed that "democratic socialism" was the only possible path to African development. It is affiliated to, but not a regional component of, the Socialist International.

The decision to set it up was taken at the 1976 Geneva meeting of the Socialist International by a group of African social democrats led by Léopold Sédar Senghor of Senegal. At the time vice-president of the SI, he was "entrusted" with the task of setting up a local organisation that would be free of accusations of any affiliation to Moscow.

The Socialist Inter-African held its inaugural meeting in Tunis on February 26–28, 1981. Eleven democratic socialist parties from across the continent attended. Amongst the founding parties was the Sudanese Socialist Union of Gaafar Nimeiry. Senghor was unable to attract all the continent's socialists; prominent exceptions included Zimbabwe and Namibia. The Soviet press declared the union of "bourgeois" parties was dangerous and opportunistic, and that the Socialist Inter-African was "programmed in Western Europe and designed in Dakar and Tunis."
