= Socialist Unity =

Socialist Unity may refer to:

- Socialist Unity (Italy), a social-democratic alliance of parties which contested the 1948 Italian general election
- Socialist Unity (Spain), a defunct electoral alliance which contested the 1977 Spanish general election
- Socialist Unity (UK), a defunct electoral coalition formed by the International Marxist Group
- Socialist Green Unity Coalition, an electoral alliance which stood candidates in the 2005 UK general election as Socialist Unity

== See also ==
- Socialist Unity Network (UK)
- Socialist Unity Centre of India (Communist)
- Socialist Unity Party (disambiguation)
