= Punjab Socialist Party =

The Punjab Socialist Party was a political party in Punjab, India. The party was founded in 1932 as a joint legal front of the Naujawan Bharat Sabha and the Kirti Kisan Sabha group. The two groups retained their separate identities inside the Punjab Socialist Party throughout the existence of the party.

When the Congress Socialist Party, an all-India socialist organisation working within the Indian National Congress, was founded in 1934, the Punjab Socialist Party was reluctant to joining it. The PSP was opposed to the Congress, and was unwilling to join an organisation working within the Congress ranks. However, in 1936 the Punjab Socialist Party, along with the Punjab branch of the Communist Party of India, joined the Congress Socialist Party. Both of the constituent groups of the Punjab Socialist Party retained their political identities inside CSP after the merger.
