= Democratic Socialist Party (Guinea-Bissau) =

Political party in Guinea-Bissau

The Democratic Socialist Party (Portuguese: Partido Democrático Socialista) was a political party in Guinea-Bissau.

== History ==
The party first contested national elections in 2004, when it ran in the parliamentary elections that year. It received 2% of the vote, but failed to win a seat. In the 2008 elections its vote share fell to 0.4% and it remained without representation in the National People's Assembly.
