= Polish Socialist Party (disambiguation) =

The Polish Socialist Party was in existence from 1892-1948 and has been again since 1987.

Polish Socialist Party may also refer to:

- Polish Socialist Party – Freedom, Equality, Independence, an underground party during World War II
- Polish Socialist Party – Left (founded 1906)
- Polish Socialist Party – Revolutionary Faction (founded 1906)
- Polish Socialist Party of the Prussian Partition (1893-1919)
