= Zairian Socialist Party =

Zairian Socialist Party (French: Parti Socialiste Zaïrois) was a Zairian political party, based in exile. The general secretary of the party was Betou Aime.
