= Springfield Police Department =

Springfield Police Department may refer to:

- Springfield Police Department (Florida)
- Springfield Police Department (Georgia)
- Springfield Police Department (Illinois)
- Springfield Police Department (Massachusetts)
- Springfield Police Department (Minnesota)
- Springfield Police Department (Missouri)
- Springfield Police Department (New Jersey)
- Springfield Police Department (Ohio)
- Springfield Police Department (Oregon)
- Springfield Police Department (Tennessee)
- Springfield Police Department (Vermont)
- Springfield Police Service (Manitoba, Canada)
- Springfield Township Police Department (Ohio)
- Springfield Township Police Department (Pennsylvania)
- Springfield Department of Public Safety (Michigan)
- West Springfield Police Department (Massachusetts)
