= Social Democrats of Uganda =

Political party in Uganda

- Founded: 2003
- Headquarters: Kampala, Uganda
- Ideology: Social democracy Economic equity Democratic socialism

Election Commission of Uganda Social Democrats of Uganda is a political party in Uganda, founded in 2003. The party was registered with the on April 1, 2004. The founding president of SDU was. Later, Sempala the left SDU for the Forum for Democratic Change.

Ahead of the 2021 Uganda general elections, the party joined the Democratic Party to form a coalition
