= Authentic Socialist Party =

Authentic Socialist Party may refer to:

- Authentic Socialist Party (Argentina)
- Authentic Socialist Party (Senegal)
