= Popular Socialist Party =

Popular Socialist Party may refer to:

- Dominican Popular Socialist Party
- Popular Socialist Party (Argentina)
- Popular Socialist Party (Brazil)
- Popular Socialist Party (Chile)
- Popular Socialist Party (Cuba)
- Popular Socialist Party (Haiti)
- Popular Socialist Party (Mexico)
- Popular Socialist Party (Spain)
- Popular Socialist Party of Mexico
- Labour Popular Socialist Party, early 20th-century Russian party
- Lithuanian Popular Socialist Democratic Party
- Praja Socialist Party (India)

== See also ==
- List of socialist parties
- People's Socialist Party (disambiguation)
- Socialist People's Party (disambiguation)
