= Józef Biniszkiewicz =

Józef Biniszkiewicz (Polish pronunciation: [ˈjuzɛv biɲiˈʂkʲɛvit͡ʂ]; March 9, 1875 Czempiń – July 9, 1940, Buchenwald) was a Silesian socialist politician. In 1891 he moved to Berlin, Germany, where he joined the Social Democratic Party of Germany (SPD). On July 3, 1895, he shifted his party membership to the Polish Socialist Party in Prussia (PPS zp) and would become the chairman of the PPS zp branch in Berlin, the 'Polish Socialist Society' (Towarzystwa Socjalistów Polskich). He was the editor of Gazeta Robotnicza ('Workers' Gazette') between May and October 1896. Towards the end of the 1890s he opened a workshop in Berlin.

In 1906 he moved to Kattowitz, where he revived Gazeta Robotnicza. In Upper Silesia, he differed with the German socialists on the issue of the Polish national question. In 1905 he had opposed the PPS zp becoming a part of SPD.

In 1922 he became a member of the Silesian Sejm on behalf of the Polish Socialist Party (PPS), and until January 17, 1928 he was the leader of PPS regional organization in Upper Silesia. In April 1928 he was expelled from the PPS for not supporting the opposition of PPS against the Józef Piłsudski government. After being expelled he formed a new party, the Silesian Socialist Party. His group was able to take over the regional PPS organ, Robotnik Śląski ('Silesian Worker'). The Silesian Socialist Party, which was seen as pro-Sanacja, did however fail to make any major political impact.

In his later years, Biniszkiewicz settled in Tarnowitz and became a liquor merchant. He was captured by German forces during World War II, and died in the Buchenwald concentration camp.

== Bibliography ==
- (in Polish) Kaczmarek, Ryszard. Józef Biniszkiewicz: 1875-1940 : biografia polityczna. Prace naukowe Uniwersytetu Śląskiego w Katowicach, nr 1417. Katowice: Wydawn. Uniwersytetu Śląskiego, 1994.
- (in Polish) Zieliński, Władysław. Józef Biniszkiewicz 1875 - 1940; działacz polityczny, przywódca ruchu socjalistycznego na Górnym Śląsku. Katowice: Katowickie Towarzystwo Społeczno-Kulturalne, 1987.
