= Socialist Party of Yugoslavia (2002) =

Montenegrin political party

Socialist Party of Yugoslavia (Montenegrin: СПЈ - Социјалистичка партија Југославије, SPJ - Socijalistička partija Jugoslavije) is a former socialist political party in Montenegro. It was founded in 2002 with its seat in Podgorica.

In the 2002 elections to the Parliament of Montenegro SPJ contested on the list Socijalistička partija Jugoslavije sa komunistima - za očuvanje Jugoslavije together with League of Communists of Yugoslavia-Communists of Montenegro, New Communist Party of Yugoslavia and Yugoslav Communists. The list got 0.66% of votes.

In the 2002 municipal elections (held in 19 municipalities) SPJ contested in Budva (1%, no seats), Danilovgrad (3.86%, 1 seat), Mojkovac (1.19%, no seat) and Tivat (3.84%, 1 seat).
