= S&D (disambiguation) =

S&D often refers to the Progressive Alliance of Socialists and Democrats. It may also refer to:

- Scratch & Dig, a measure of Surface imperfections of optics
- Search and destroy, a military strategy, notoriously in the Vietnam War
- Silver & Deming, reduced-shank drill bits
- Somerset & Dorset Joint Railway, English railway line
- Speech and debate, e.g. in debating societies
- Spybot – Search & Destroy, a spyware and adware removal program for Windows
- Supply and demand, an economic model of price determination in a market

== See also ==
- S&DR, the Stockton and Darlington Railway
- D&S (disambiguation)
