= Socialist Party of Kansas =

- Senate leader: None
- House leader: None
- Founded: August 1, 2008
- Headquarters: Wichita, KS
- Ideology: Democratic socialism
- National affiliation: Socialist Party USA
- Colors: Red

The Socialist Party of Kansas (SPK) is the state chapter of the Socialist Party USA in the U.S. state of Kansas.

SPUSA was founded in 1973, after which the SPK was founded in 2008.

The party published Social Ethics magazine.

Vernon L. Smith's mother, who was based in Wichita, was a member and ran for US State Treasurer.

== Records ==
Kansas Historical Society holds the 1910 to 1956 administrative records of the party.
