= Socialist Republican Party of Ceará =

Socialist Republican Party of Ceará (Portuguese: Partido Republicano Socialista do Ceará) was a far-left socialist political party in the Ceará, Brazil. The party was founded on 2 January 1934. It was led by Moacin Caminha.

The party contested the 14 October 1934 elections to the Federal Chamber and the Ceará Constituent Assembly. The party nominated one candidate for the federal election and 10 candidates for the state assembly. None of its candidates were elected.
