= Party of Democratic Socialism =

Party of Democratic Socialism may refer to:

- Party of Democratic Socialism (Czech Republic), founded 1997
- Party of Democratic Socialism (Germany), 1989–2007
- Party of Democratic Socialism (Greece), 1979–1989
- Party of Democratic Socialism (India), founded 2001
- Parti de la Democratie Socialiste, 1963-2002

== See also ==
- List of democratic socialist parties and organizations
- Democratic Left (disambiguation)
- Democratic Socialist Party (disambiguation)
