= Liberal Socialist Action Party =

Liberal Socialist Action Party Partito d'Azione Liberalsocialista
- Leader: Nicola Terraciano
- Founder: Bruno Zevi
- Founded: 28 December 1998
- Ideology: Liberal socialism
- Political position: Center-left to left-wing
- Colours: Red
- Chamber of Deputies: 0 / 630
- Senate: 0 / 315
- European Parliament: 0 / 73
- Regional Councils: 0 / 897

Website
- liberalsocialisti.org

The Liberal Socialist Action Party (Partito d'Azione Liberalsocialista) is a minor social liberal political party in Italy. It was founded in 1998 in Rome by architect Bruno Zevi. It is currently led by Nicola Terracciano.

The party describes itself as a left-wing party. It supports strengthening the United Nations and the European Union to promote peace, justice, humanity, freedom and democracy, and wants to "disarm" the Catholic Church and other religious organisations. The party also wants to guarantee full employment in Italy.

It is not represented in the Italian Parliament, the European Parliament, nor in any regional or provincial assemblies.
