= Communitarian Democratic Party =

The Communitarian Democratic Party (Toplumcu Demokratik Parti, TDP) is a minor Turkish social-democratic political party. The party was founded in 2002 as a split from the Democratic Left Party, by then deputy Dr. Sema Tutar Pişkinsüt, who still leads the party. In the 2002 Turkish general elections the TDP had candidates on the list of the Freedom and Solidarity Party.
