= Socialist Democrat Party =

Political party in Peru

Socialist Democrat Party (in Spanish: Partido Demócrata Socialista) was a political party in Peru that was founded in 1944. Its president was Luis A. Suárez, internal secretary Manuel Sánchez Palacios and organizational secretary G. Carrión Matos.
