= Social Democratic Party =

Name of political parties around the world

The name Social Democratic Party or Social Democrats has been used by many political parties in various countries around the world. Such parties are most commonly aligned to social democracy as their political ideology.

== Active parties ==
Nation	Party
Afghanistan	Afghan Social Democratic Party (Afghan Millat); Pashtoons Social Democratic Party
Åland	Åland Social Democrats
Albania	Social Democratic Party of Albania
Andorra	Social Democratic Party
Angola	Social Democratic Party
Austria	Social Democratic Party of Austria
Azerbaijan	Azerbaijani Social Democratic Party
Belarus	Belarusian Social Democratic Party (Assembly) (banned); Belarusian Social Democratic Party (People's Assembly) (banned)
Benin	Social Democratic Party
Bosnia and Herzegovina	Social Democratic Party of Bosnia and Herzegovina
Brazil	Brazilian Social Democracy Party; Social Democratic Party (Brazil, 2011)
Bulgaria	Bulgarian Social Democratic Party; Party of Bulgarian Social Democrats; Political Movement "Social Democrats"
Cape Verde	Social Democratic Party
Central African Republic	Social Democratic Party
Colombia	Colombian Social Democratic Party
Croatia	Croatian Social Democrats; Social Democratic Party of Croatia
Czech Republic	Czech Social Democratic Party
Denmark	Social Democrats
Egypt	Egyptian Social Democratic Party
El Salvador	Social Democratic Party
Estonia	Social Democratic Party
Ethiopia	Ethiopian Social Democratic Party
Faroe Islands	Social Democratic Party
Finland	Social Democratic Party of Finland
Gabon	Social Democratic Party
Germany	Social Democratic Party of Germany
Gibraltar	Gibraltar Social Democrats
Greece	Movement for Change (Greece)
Guinea-Bissau	Social Democratic Party
Guinea-Bissau	United Social Democratic Party
Hong Kong	League of Social Democrats
Hungary	Social Democratic Party of Hungary
India	Social Democratic Party of India
Ireland	Social Democrats
Italy	Social Democratic Rebirth
Japan	Social Democratic Party
Kenya	Social Democratic Party of Kenya
Kosovo	Social Democratic Initiative; Social Democratic Party of Kosovo
Latvia	Social Democratic Party "Harmony"
Lithuania	Social Democratic Party of Lithuania
Madagascar	Social Democratic Party of Madagascar
Mauritius	Mauritian Social Democratic Party
Moldova	Social Democratic Party; European Social Democratic Party
Mongolia	Mongolian Social Democratic Party; Mongolian People's Party; Mongolian Democratic Party; HUN Party
Montenegro	Social Democratic Party of Montenegro
Nicaragua	Social Democratic Party
Niger	Social Democratic Party
Nigeria	Social Democratic Party
North Korea	Korean Social Democratic Party
Papua New Guinea	Social Democratic Party
Poland	Social Democracy of Poland
Portugal	Social Democratic Party
Romania	Social Democratic Party
Rwanda	Social Democratic Party
Serbia	Social Democratic Party; Social Democratic Party of Serbia
Slovakia	Direction – Social Democracy
Slovenia	Social Democrats
South Korea	Social Democratic Party
Sweden	Swedish Social Democratic Party
Switzerland	Social Democratic Party of Switzerland
Taiwan	Social Democratic Party
Tajikistan	Social Democratic Party
Timor-Leste	Social Democratic Party
Transnistria	Social Democratic Party of Transnistria
Ukraine	Social Democratic Party of Ukraine; Social Democratic Party of Ukraine (united)
United Kingdom	Social Democratic Party
United States	Social Democrats, USA
Uzbekistan	Justice Social Democratic Party

== Former parties ==
Nation	Party
Algeria	Social Democratic Party
Australia	Social Democratic Party
Bahamas	Social Democratic Party
Bolivia	Social Democratic Party
Brazil	Social Democratic Party (1945); Social Democratic Party (1987)
Canada	Parti social démocratique du Québec; Social Democratic Party of Canada
China	Social Democratic Party of China
Czechoslovakia	Hungarian-German Social Democratic Party
Danzig	Social Democratic Party of the Free City of Danzig
East Germany	Social Democratic Party in the GDR
Estonia	Russian Social Democratic Party of Estonia
France	Social Democratic Party
Georgia	Social Democratic Party of Georgia
Hungary	Social Democratic Party
Iceland	Social Democratic Party
Iran	Social Democratic Party
Italy	Italian Social Democratic Party; Social Democratic Party of South Tyrol
Japan	Social Democratic Party (1901); Social Democratic Party (1926)
Kyrgyzstan	Social Democratic Party of Kyrgyzstan
Latvia	Latvian Social Democratic Party; Social Democratic Party
Luxembourg	Social Democratic Party
Malaysia	Social Democratic Party
Mexico	Social Democracy; Social Democratic Party
Netherlands	Social Democratic Party
New Zealand	Social Democratic Party
North Macedonia	Social Democratic Union of North Macedonia Social Democratic Party
Norway	Social Democratic Labour Party
Romania	Social Democratic Party of Romania (1910–18); Romanian Social Democratic Party (1927–48); Romanian Social Democratic Party (1990–2001)
Russia	Russian Social Democratic Labour Party; Social Democratic Party of Russia (1990–2011); Russian Party of Social Democracy; Russian United Social Democratic Party; Social Democratic Party of Russia (2001–07); Union of Social Democrats; Social Democratic Party of Russia (2012–19)
Saar	Social Democratic Party of Saarland
Serbia	Serbian Social Democratic Party
Serbia	Social Democratic Party
Slovenia	Social Democratic Party of Slovenia
Spain	Social Democratic Party (1976); Social Democratic Party (2005)
Thailand	Social Democratic Party
Trinidad and Tobago	Social Democratic Labour Party of Trinidad and Tobago
Turkey	Social Democracy Party (SODEP)
Ukraine	Ukrainian Social Democratic Party (1899); Ukrainian Social Democratic Party
United Kingdom	Social Democratic Federation (known as the Social Democratic Party 1907–11); Social Democratic Party (1979–82); Social Democratic Party (1981–88); Social Democratic Party (1988–90)
United States	Social Democratic Party; Social-Democratic Workingmen's Party of North America
Yugoslavia	Social Democratic Party of Yugoslavia; Yugoslav Social Democratic Party
Zambia	Social Democratic Party

== See also ==
- Democratic Socialist Party (disambiguation)
- List of Labour Parties
- Party for Social Democracy
- Partido Social Democrata (disambiguation)
- List of socialist parties
- Socialist International
- New Social Democracy (disambiguation)
- Socialists and Democrats (disambiguation)
- List of social democratic parties
